= List of places in Timișoara =

This is a list of the most important tourist sites in Timișoara, Romania.

== Historical ==
=== Places of worship ===
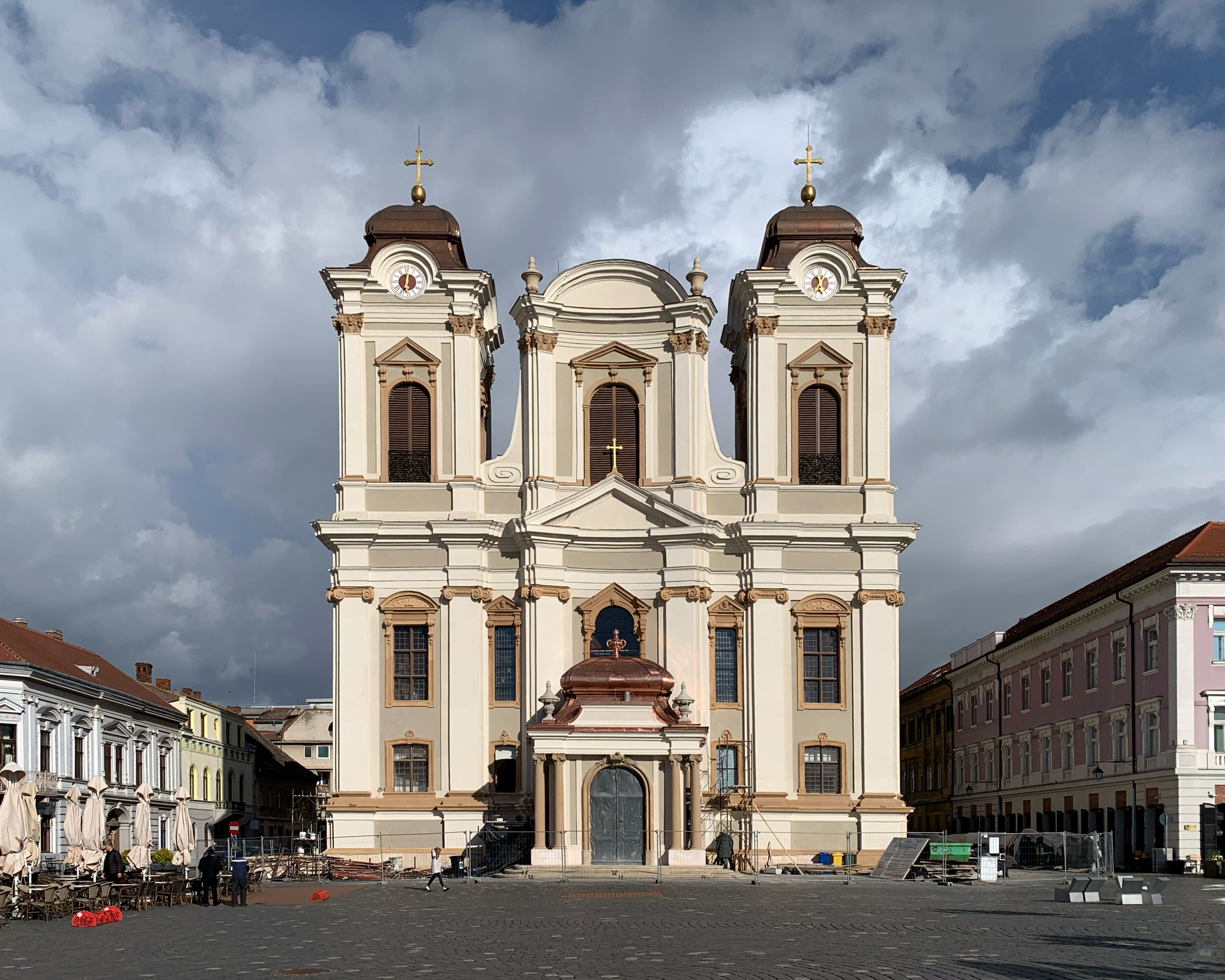
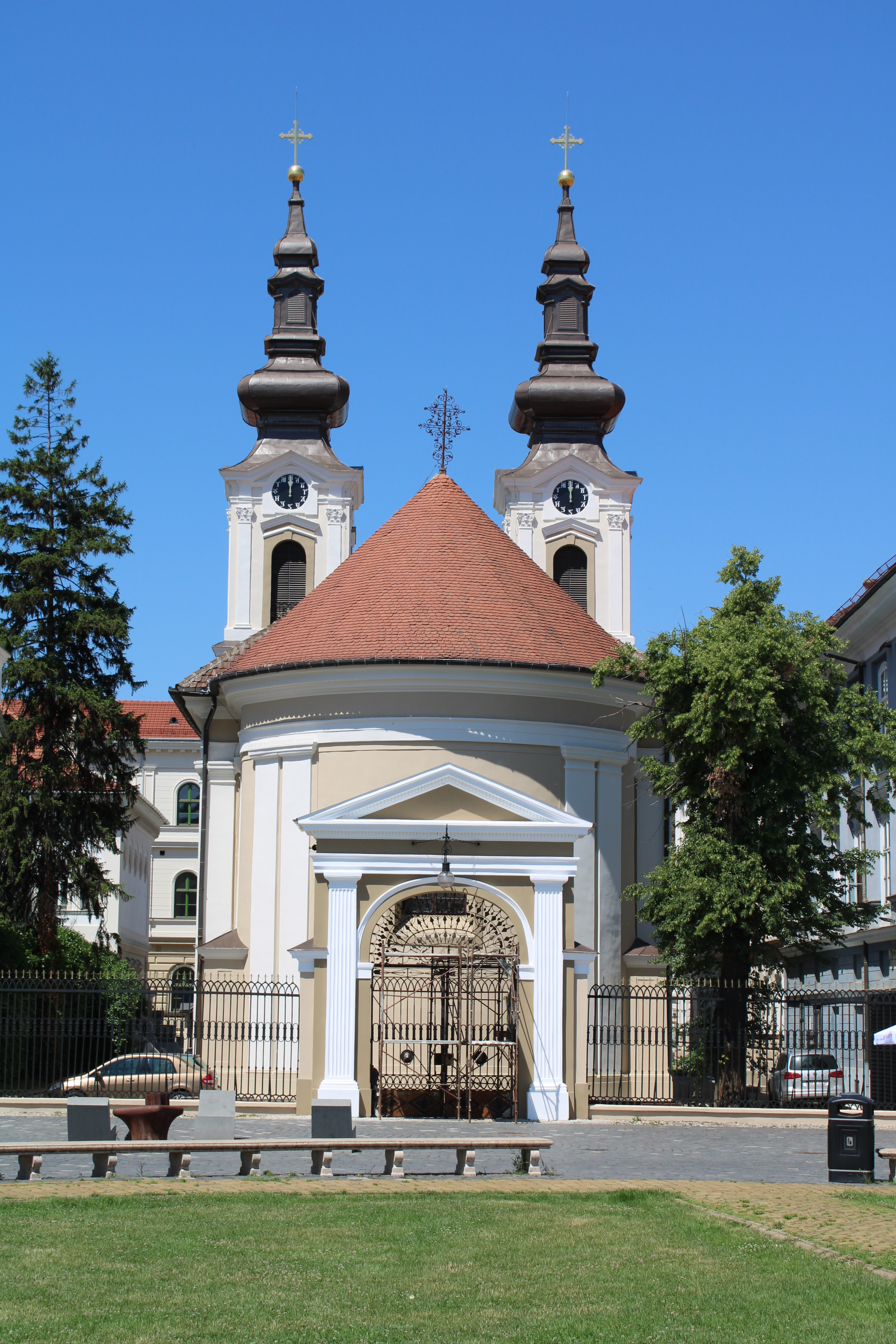
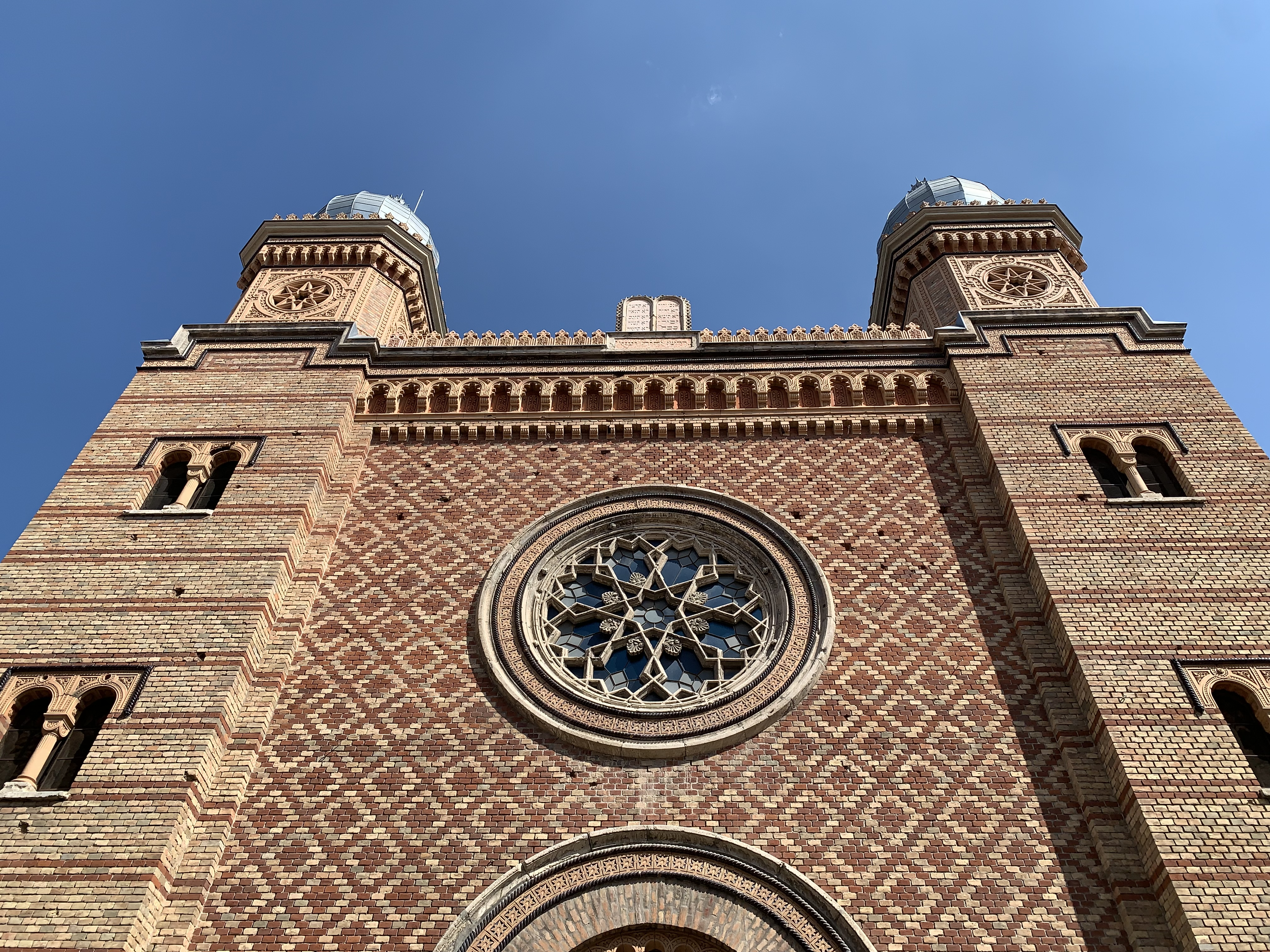
- Metropolitan Cathedral
- Roman Catholic Dome
- Serbian Orthodox Cathedral
- Cetate Synagogue

==== Greek Catholic ====
- Elisabetin Greek Catholic Church
- Fabric Greek Catholic Church
- Mehala Greek Catholic Church
- Misericordia Church

==== Jewish ====
- Cetate Synagogue
- Fabric New Synagogue
- Fabric Orthodox Synagogue
- Fabric Sephardic Synagogue
- Iosefin Synagogue

==== Lutheran ====
- Lutheran Church

==== Reformed ====
- Elisabetin Reformed Church
- New Millennium Reformed Church

==== Roman Catholic ====
- Elisabetin Roman Catholic Church
- Fratelia Roman Catholic Church
- Freidorf Roman Catholic Church
- Iosefin Roman Catholic Church
- Mehala Roman Catholic Church
- Millennium Church
- Notre Dame Church
- Piarists' Church
- Roman Catholic Dome
- Ronaț Roman Catholic Church
- Salvatorian Monastery
- St. Catherine Church

==== Romanian Orthodox ====
- Elisabetin Orthodox Church
- Freidorf Orthodox Church
- Hodoș wooden church
- Iosefin Orthodox Church
- Martyrs' Church
- Mehala Orthodox Church
- Metropolitan Cathedral
- Military Church
- St. Elijah Church
- Students' Church
- Topla wooden church

==== Serbian Orthodox ====
- Serbian Orthodox Cathedral
- St. George Serbian Church
- St. Nicholas Serbian Church

==== Ukrainian Orthodox ====
- Ukrainian Church

=== Historic houses ===
- Archduke's House
- Brück House
- Clergy's Houses
- Count Mercy House
- Grünberger House
- House of the Orthodox Community
- House of the Serbian Community in Fabric
- House with Atlantes
- House with Guild Tree
- House with Iron Axle
- House with Lions
- Hungarian House
- Ivy House
- Mühle House
- Ormós House
- Prince Eugene House
- Turkish House

=== Industrial heritage ===
- Communal Abattoir
- Fabric Water Tower
- Hydroelectric Plant
- Iosefin Water Tower
- Paltim Hat Factory
- Prohászka Mill
- Timișoreana Brewery
- Tobacco Factory

=== Palaces ===
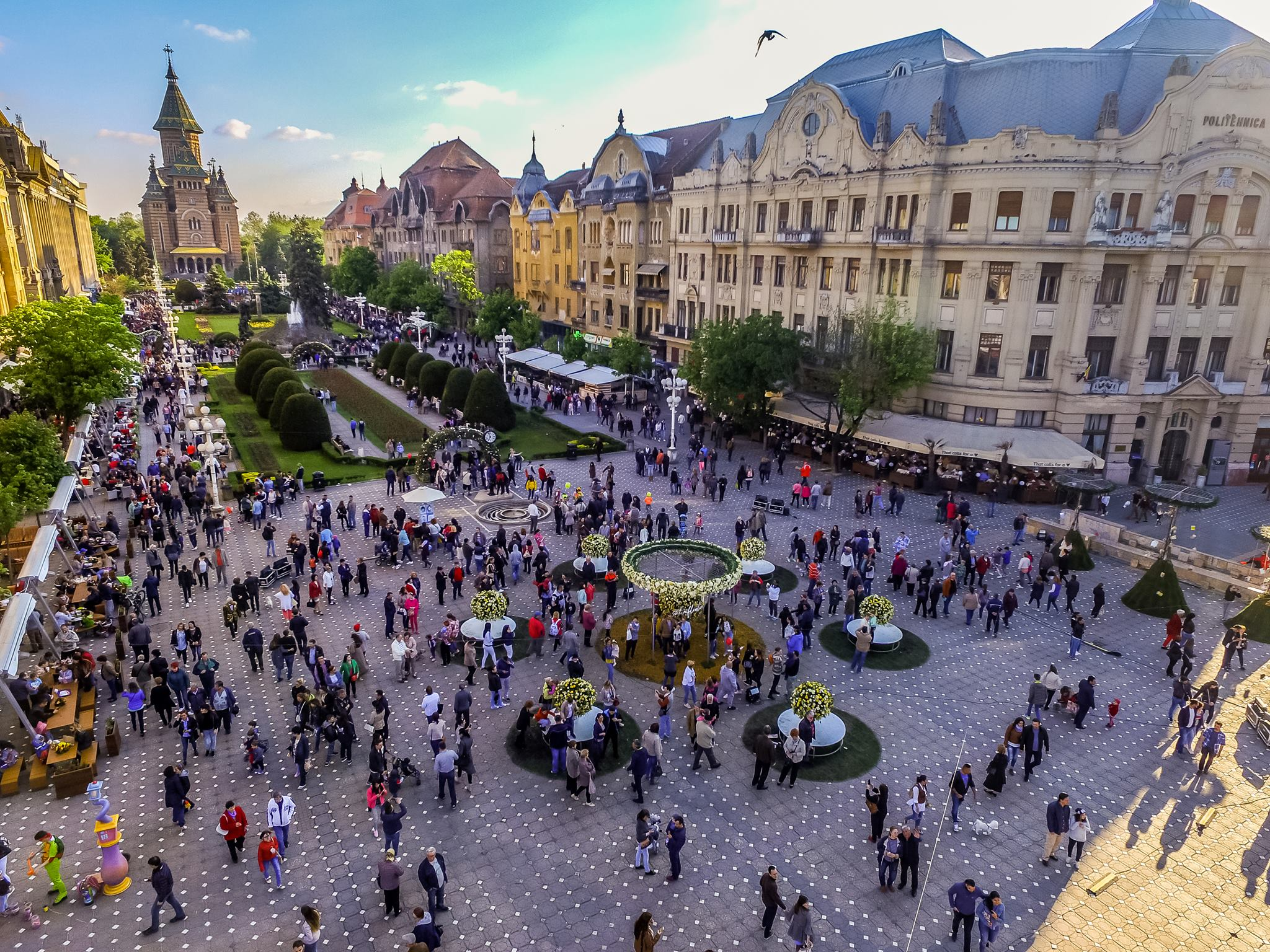
The row of palaces in Victory Square

- Administrative Palace
- Agrarian Bank Palace
- Anchor Palace
- Baroque Palace
- Dauerbach Palace
- Deschan Palace
- Dicasterial Palace
- Emmer Palace
- Flavia Palace
- Gálgon Palace
- Gemeinhardt Palace
- Hilt-Vogel Palace
- Lloyd Palace
- Löffler Palace
- Marschall Palace
- Merbl Palace
- Mercury Palace
- Nägele Palace
- Neptune Palace
- Neuhaus Palace
- Palace of Culture
- Palace of the Chamber of Commerce and Industry
- Palace of the Credit Bank
- Palace of the Israelite Community
- Palace of the National Bank
- Palace of the Reformed Community
- Palace of the United Banat Banks
- Postal Palace
- Roman Catholic Episcopal Palace
- Savings Bank Palace
- Serbian Orthodox Episcopal Palace
- Ștefania Palace
- Steiner Palace (Discount Bank)
- Szana Palace
- Széchényi Palace
- Water Palace
- Weiss Palace

=== Statues, monuments and fountains ===
- Capitoline Wolf
- Cross Obelisk
- Fidelity Column
- Fountain of Cardinal Points
- Fountain with Fish
- Monument of the Romanian Soldier
- Plague Column
- Revolution Memorial
- St. Catherine Obelisk
- St. Mary and St. John of Nepomuk Monument
- Virgin Mary Monument

=== Other historic buildings ===
- City Hall
- Cloister of the Franciscan Monastery
- Garrison Command
- Gisella Orphanage
- Huniade Castle
- Iosefin Fire Station
- La Trompetist Inn
- Military Casino
- Old Town Hall
- Prison
- Queen of England Inn
- Șari-Neni
- Southern Land Casino
- Theresia Bastion
- Transylvania Barracks
- Vienna Barracks

== Cultural ==
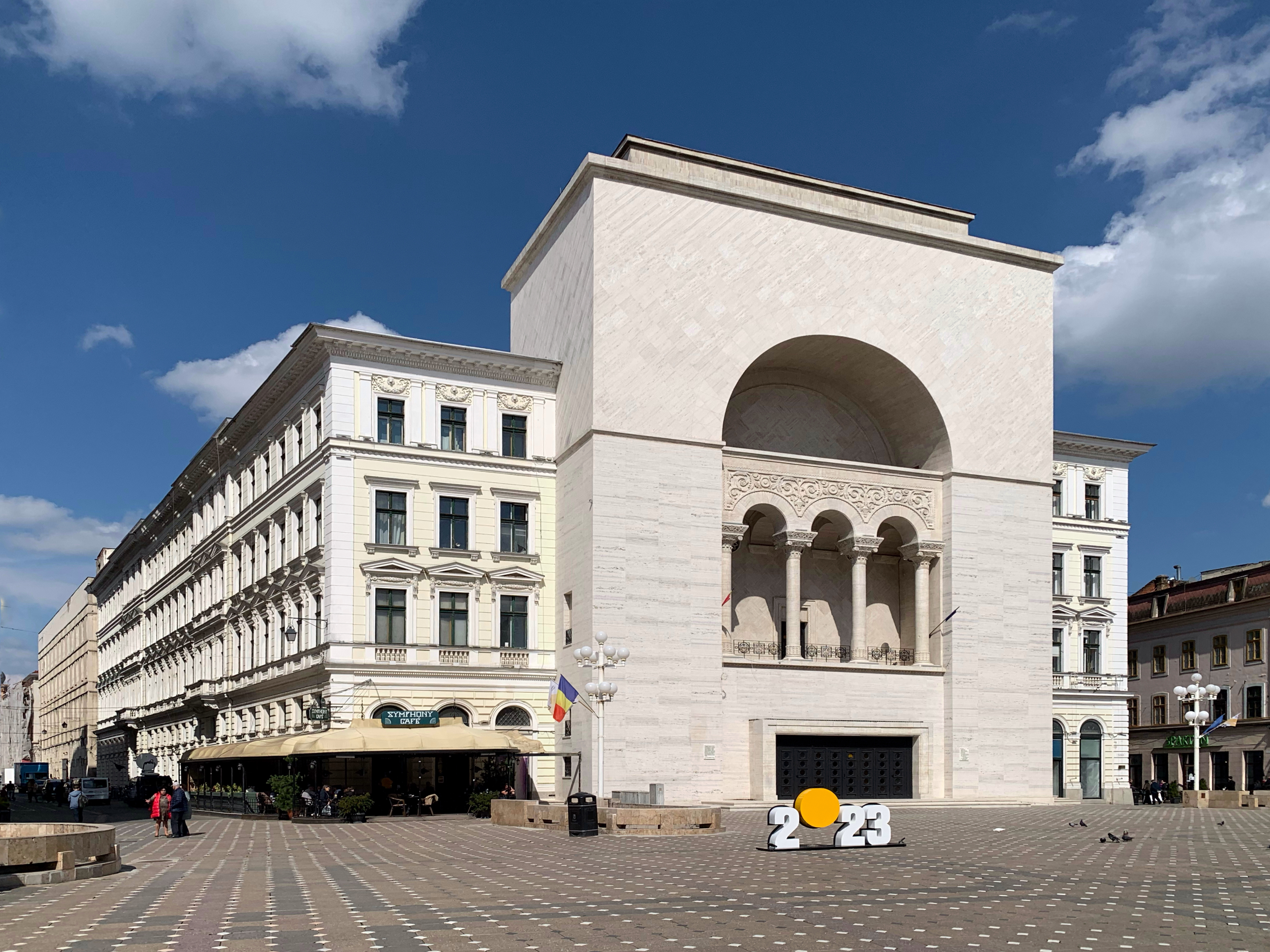
The Palace of Culture houses the Gergely Csiky Hungarian State Theatre, the German State Theatre, the Mihai Eminescu National Theatre and the Romanian National Opera.

=== Cultural centres ===
- British Cultural Centre
- Culture and Arts Centre of Timiș County
- French Cultural Centre
- German Cultural Centre
- House of Culture
- Intercultural Institute
- Students' House of Culture
- Youth House

=== Theatres ===
- Csiky Gergely Hungarian State Theatre
- German State Theatre
- Merlin Children's and Youth Theatre
- Mihai Eminescu National Theatre

=== Art galleries ===
- Calpe Gallery
- Helios Gallery
- Jecza Gallery
- Pygmalion Gallery (House of Arts)

=== Cinemas ===
- Apollo Cinema
- Capitol Cinema
- Dacia Cinema
- Studio Cinema
- Timiș Cinema
- Victoria Cinema

=== Music venues ===
- Banatul Philharmonic
- Romanian National Opera

== Museums ==
- Astronomical Observatory
- Banat Village Museum
- Corneliu Miklosi Public Transport Museum
- Military Museum
- Museum of the Communist Consumer
- National Museum of Art
- National Museum of Banat
- Water Museum

== Educational ==
=== High schools ===
- Ana Aslan National College
- Banat National College
- Béla Bartók High School
- British International School
- Carmen Sylva National Pedagogical College
- Casa Verde College
- Constantin Diaconovici Loga National College
- Dositej Obradović High School
- Emanuil Ungureanu Technical College
- Francesco Saverio Nitti Economic College
- Grigore Moisil High School
- Ion Vidu National College of Art
- Israelite High School
- Jean-Louis Calderon High School
- Nikolaus Lenau High School
- Piarist High School
- Waldorf High School
- West Technical College
- William Shakespeare High School

=== Universities ===
- King Michael I University of Life Sciences
- Politehnica University
- Tibiscus University
- Victor Babeș University of Medicine and Pharmacy
- West University

=== Libraries ===
- Central Library of Politehnica University
- Eugen Todoran Central University Library
- Sorin Titel County Library

== Healthcare ==
- CFR Hospital
- Institute of Cardiovascular Diseases
- Louis Țurcanu Children's Hospital
- Misericordia Hospital
- Municipal Hospital
- Pius Brînzeu County Hospital
- Regional Institute of Oncology
- Victor Babeș Infectious Diseases Hospital
- Victor Popescu Military Hospital

== Transport ==
=== Airports ===
- Traian Vuia International Airport

=== Bridges ===
- Andrei Șaguna Bridge
- Dacians' Bridge
- Decebalus Bridge
- Gelu Walkway
- General Ion Dragalina Bridge
- Heroes' Bridge
- Iron Bridge
- Iuliu Maniu Bridge
- Lovers' Walkway
- Mary Bridge
- Michael the Brave Bridge
- Michelangelo Bridge
- Modoș Bridge

=== Streets and boulevards ===
- 3 August 1919 Boulevard
- 16 December 1989 Boulevard
- 1989 Revolution Boulevard
- 20 December 1989 Street
- Calea Aradului
- Calea Bogdăneștilor
- Calea Buziașului
- Calea Circumvalațiunii
- Calea Martirilor
- Calea Șagului
- Calea Sever Bocu
- Calea Stan Vidrighin
- Calea Torontalului
- Citadel Boulevard
- Constantin Brâncoveanu Boulevard
- Constantin Diaconovici Loga Boulevard
- General Ion Dragalina Boulevard
- Ion C. Brătianu Boulevard
- King Ferdinand I Boulevard
- King Michael I Boulevard
- Liviu Rebreanu Boulevard
- Michael the Brave Boulevard
- Republic Boulevard
- Splaiul Nicolae Titulescu
- Splaiul Tudor Vladimirescu
- Take Ionescu Boulevard
- Vasile Pârvan Boulevard

=== Public squares ===
- 700 Square
- Alexandru Mocioni Square
- Church Square
- Council of Europe Square
- Cross Square
- Gheorghe Domășneanu Square
- Ion I. C. Brătianu Square
- Leonardo da Vinci Square
- Liberty Square
- Mărăști Square
- Nicolae Bălcescu Square
- Pleven Square
- Romans' Square
- St. George Square
- St. Mary Square
- Țepeș Vodă Square
- Trajan Square
- Union Square
- Veterans' Square
- Victory Square

=== Railway stations ===
- East Station
- North Station
- South Station
- West Station

== Forests, parks and gardens ==
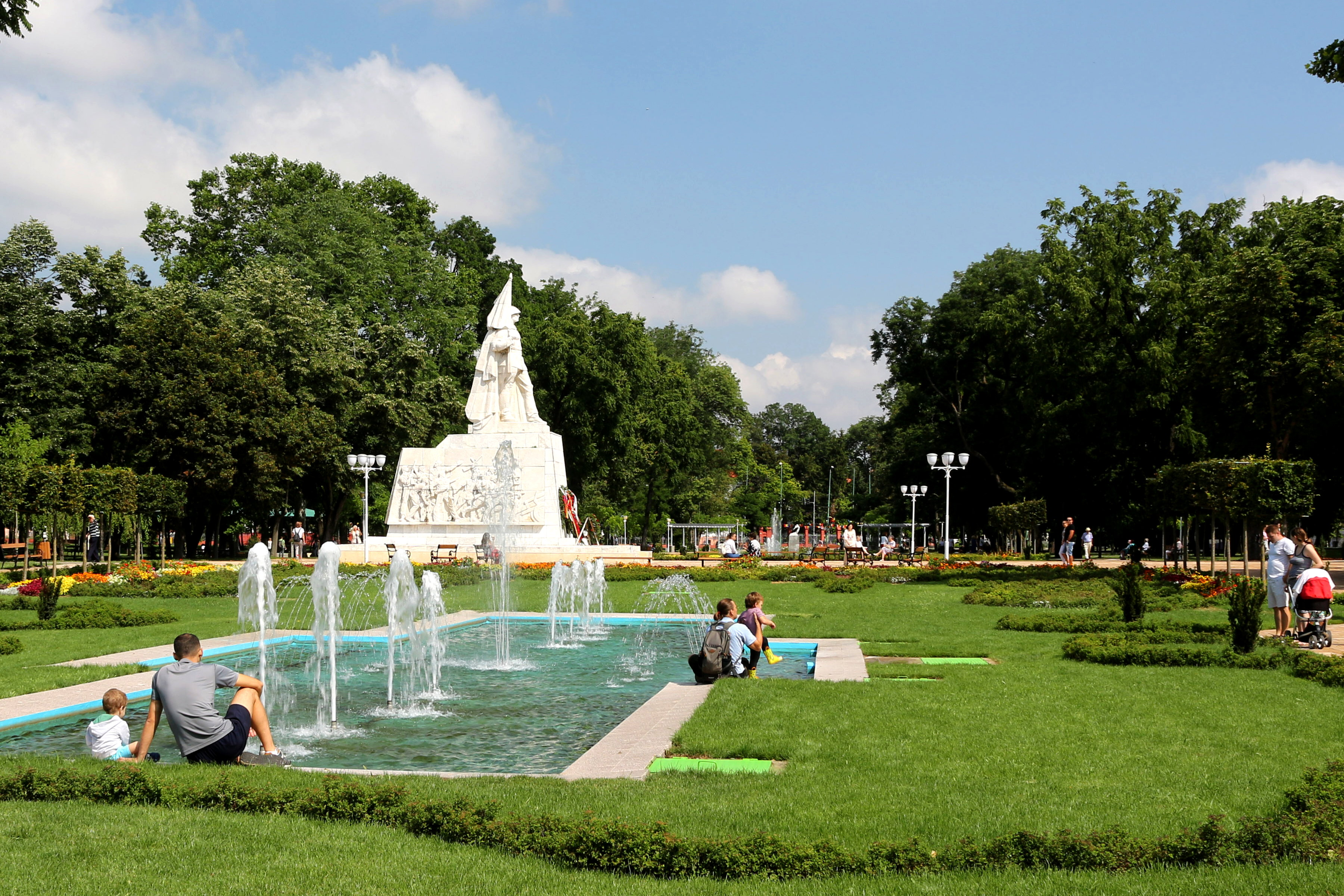
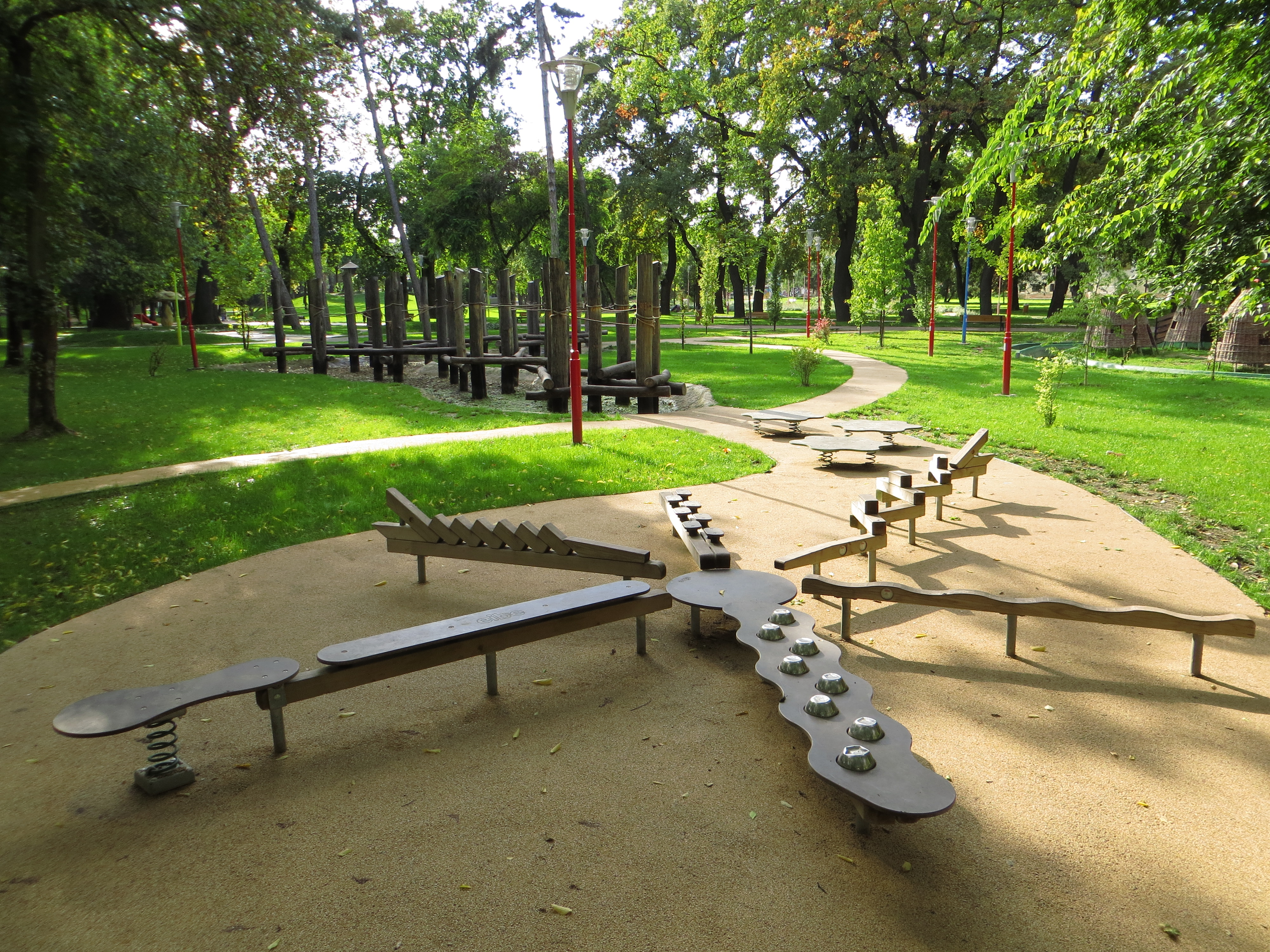
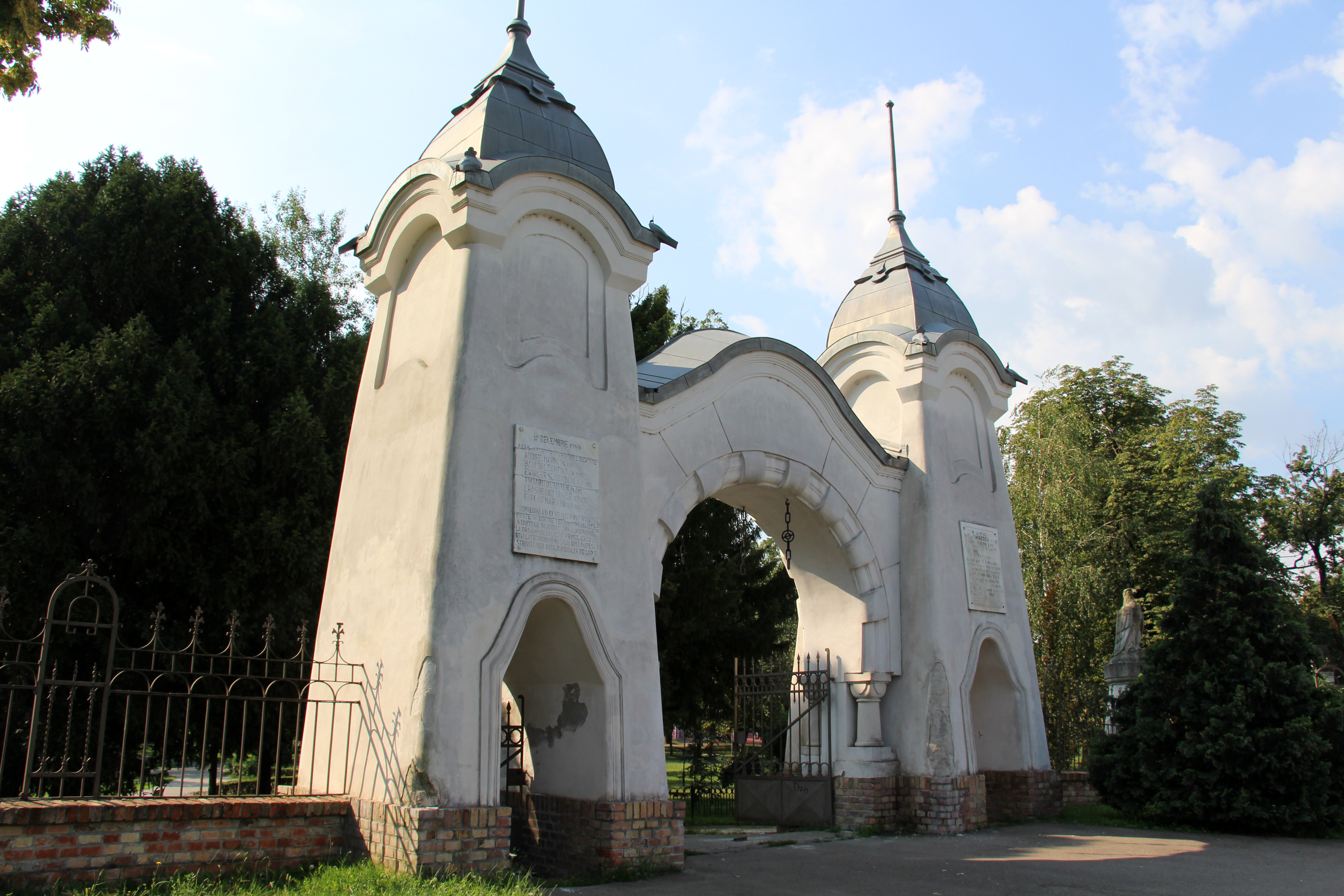
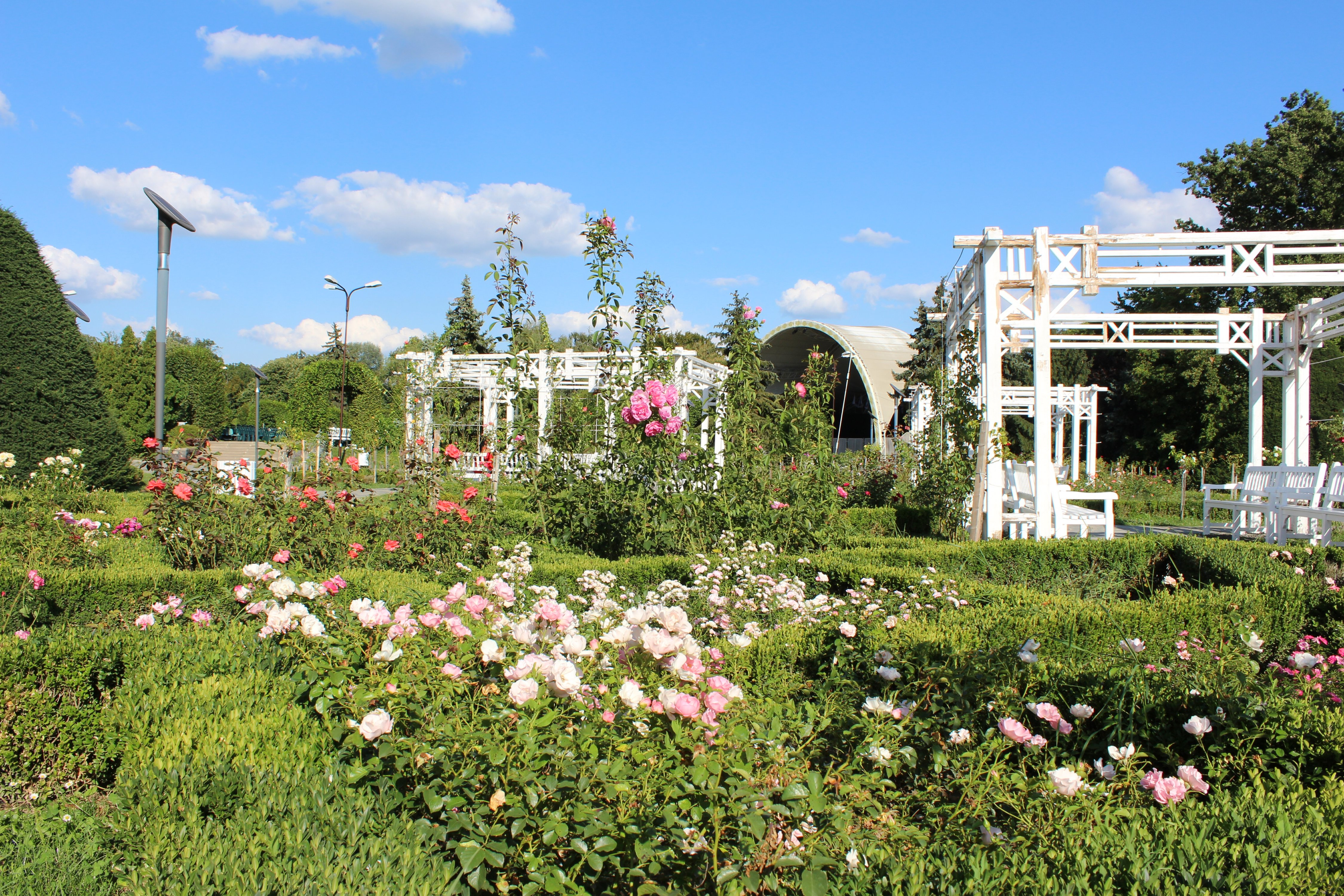
- Anton Scudier Central Park
- Ion Creangă Children's Park
- Queen Marie Park
- Roses Park
- Alpinet Park
- Andrei Mocioni Park
- Anton Scudier Central Park
- Botanical Park
- Carmen Sylva Park
- Cathedral Park
- Civic Park
- Green Forest
- Ion C. Brătianu Park
- Ion Creangă Children's Park
- Justice Park
- Lidia Park
- Queen Marie Park
- Roses Park
- Zoological Garden

== Sports venues ==
- CFR Stadium
- Ciarda Roșie Stadium
- Constantin Jude Sports Hall
- Dan Păltinișanu Stadium
- Electrica Stadium
- Gheorghe Rășcanu Stadium
- Heroes of Timișoara Arena
- Politehnica Polyvalent Hall
- Știința Stadium

== Malls and shopping centers ==
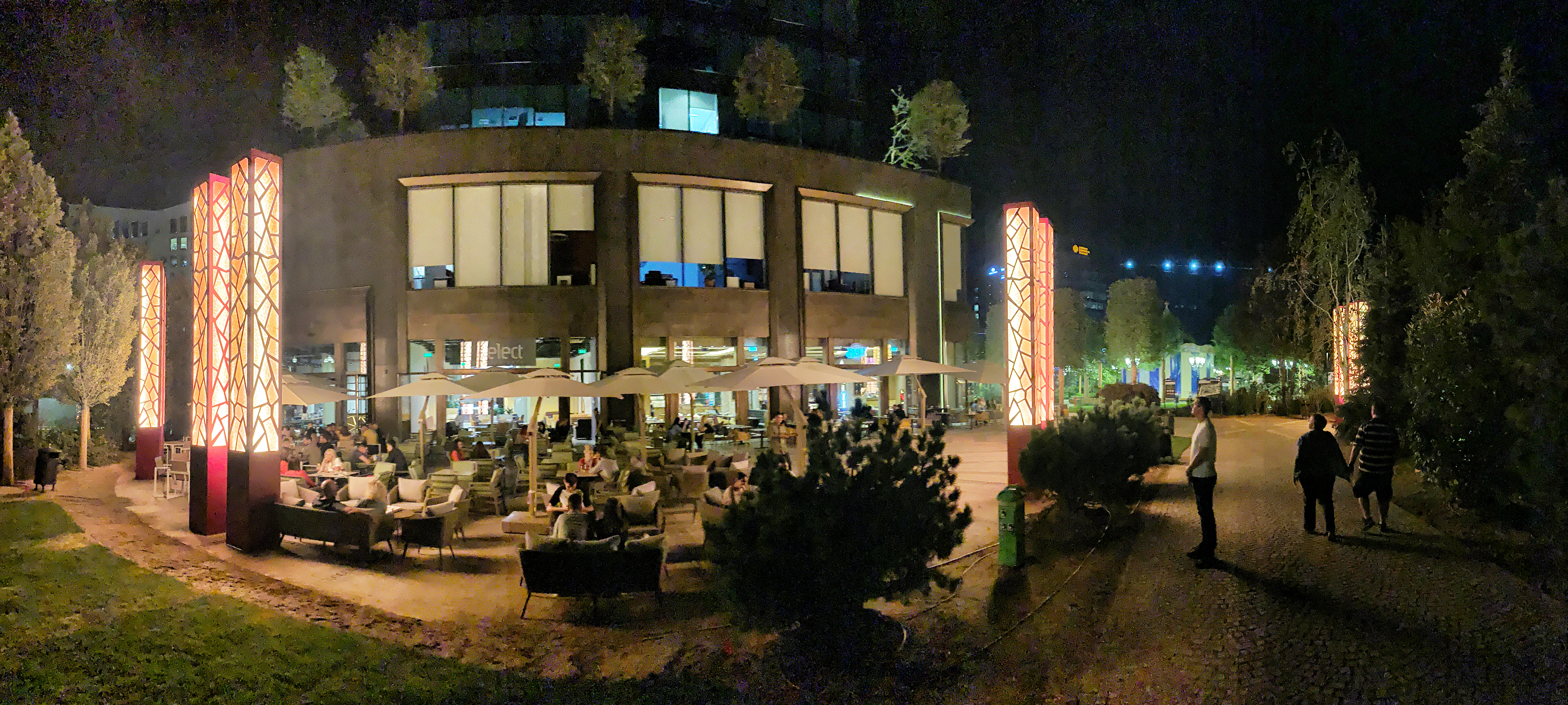
Iulius Mall, part of Iulius Town

- Alfa Center
- Bega Shopping Center
- FunShop Park
- Galeria 1
- Iulius Mall
- Kapa Shopping Center
- Shopping City

== Hotels ==
- Atlas Hotel
- Boavista Hotel
- Continental Hotel
- Del Corso Hotel
- Hotel Timișoara
- ibis Timișoara City Center
- Iosefin Residence
- Mercure Hotel
- Savoy Hotel
- Tresor Le Palais

== Business centers ==
- AGN Business Center
- Industrial and Technological Park
- Optica Business Park
- United Business Center
- Vox Technology Park

== Cemeteries ==
- Calea Șagului Cemetery
- Heroes' Cemetery
- Jewish Cemetery
- Poor Cemetery
- Rusu Șirianu Cemetery
