= Timișoara West railway station =

Railway station in Timișoara, Romania

Timișoara Vest
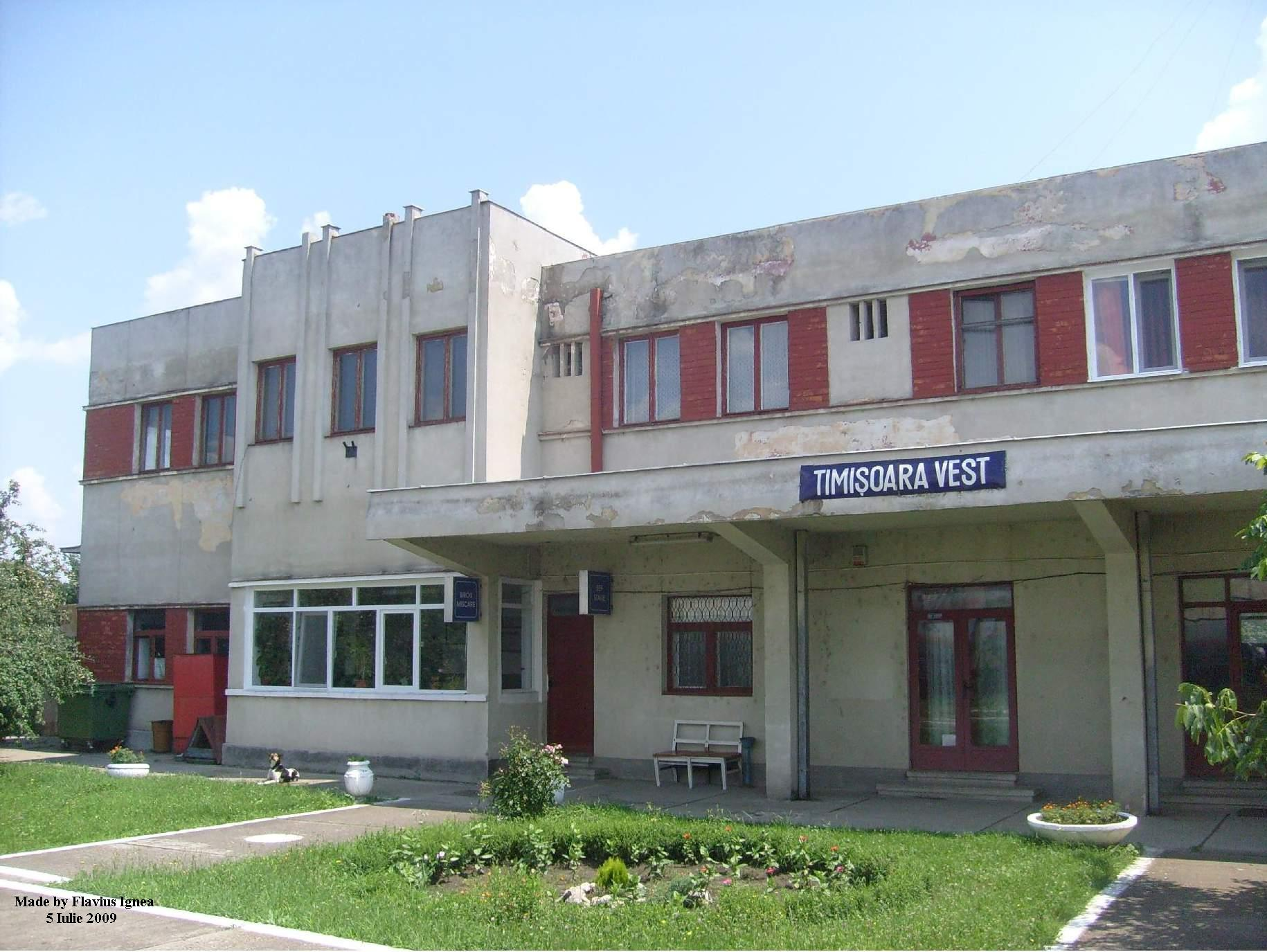

General information
- Location: 1 Dumitru Bagdasar Street, Timișoara; Romania
- Coordinates: 45°43′33″N 21°10′18″E
- Owner: Căile Ferate Române
- Operator: Căile Ferate Române
- Line: CFR Line 926 (Timișoara–Cruceni)
Location

Timișoara West railway station is a station located in Freidorf district of Timișoara. Crossed by CFR Line 926 (Timișoara–Cruceni), the station is currently transited mainly by freight trains serving the fuel depots in the area; a single passenger train connects Timișoara to Cruceni, a village located 49 km from the city.

Traffic on the 49-km-long Timișoara–Cruceni railway began on 31 July 1897. Timișoara West originally had a Class III station building with a side wing (opened in 1897, in the same year as the railway). A new station was built in the 1970s about 350 m from the old building. Over time, it had several names, depending on the politico-historical context: at the time of the inauguration of the Timișoara–Cruceni railway it was named Szabadfalu (the Hungarian name of Freidorf), after World War I it was called Sâmbăta, and after World War II Freidorf; it got its current name in the 1970s.
