= Timișoara CFR Hospital =

CF Clinical Hospital
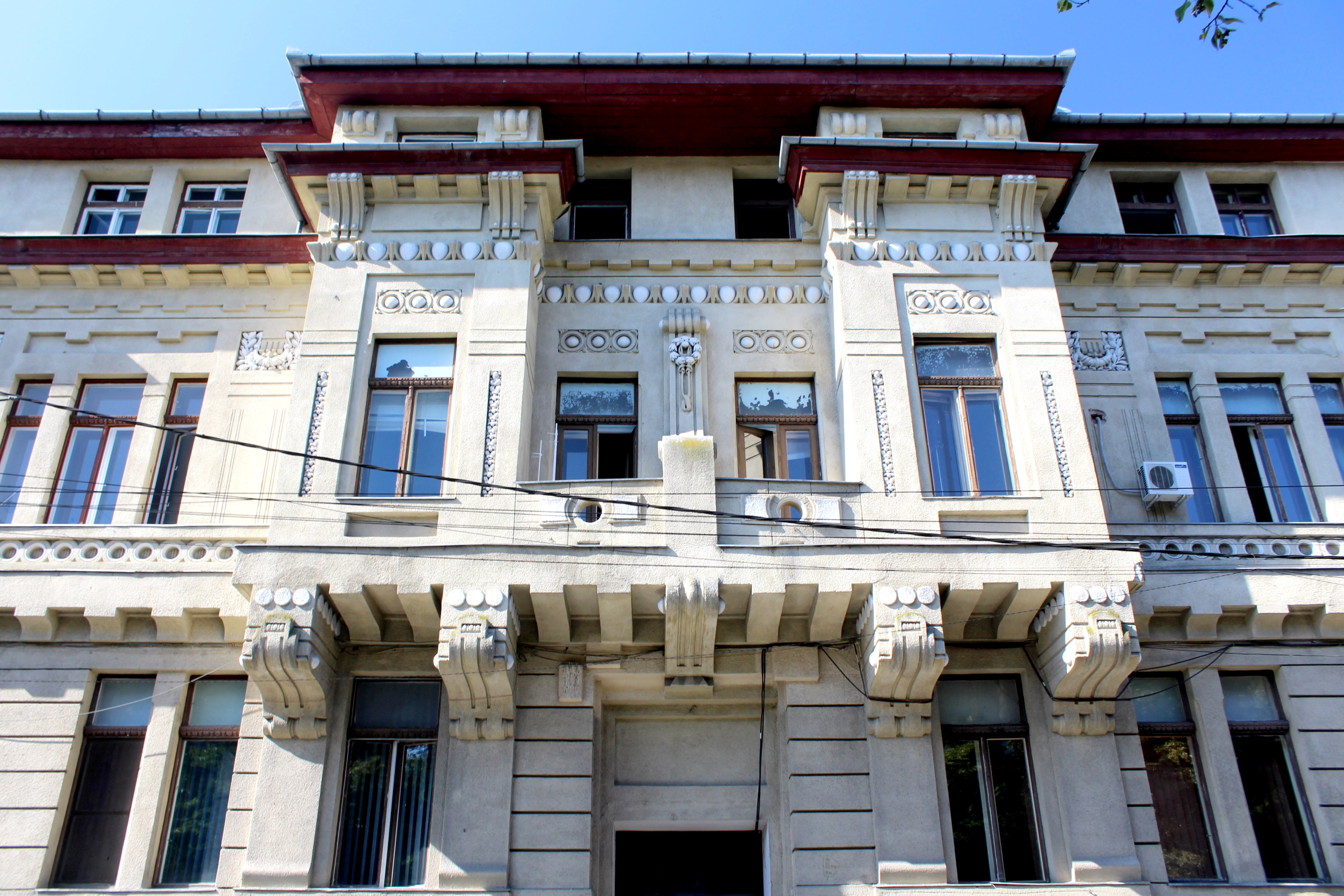
- Pavilion 13 of the CF Clinical Hospital, designed by Eduard Reiter

Geography
- Location: Timișoara, Romania
- Coordinates: 45°44′56″N 21°13′7″E

Organisation
- Funding: Public hospital

Services
- Emergency department: Yes
- Beds: 212

History
- Opened: 1958

Links
- Website: www.spitalcftm.ro

CF Clinical Hospital (Romanian: Spitalul Clinic CF), also known as CFR Hospital, is a public hospital in Timișoara, Romania, serving mainly employees of Căile Ferate Române, the state railway carrier of Romania. Subordinated to the Ministry of Transport, it has almost 60 doctors covering 25 medical specialties. It has 212 beds for continuous hospitalization and 14 beds for day hospitalization and offers services in areas such as cardiology, general surgery, gastroenterology, diabetes and metabolic diseases, internal medicine, ophthalmology, ENT, neurology, pulmonology, ICU, rheumatology, and urology.

== Layout ==
CF Clinical Hospital consists of five buildings (pavilion system) located at 13–15 Tudor Vladimirescu Embankment and a building at 1 Gării Street (1 km away), where the Radiology and Medical Imaging outpatient clinic, as well as the Occupational Medicine office, operate. The buildings at 13–15 Tudor Vladimirescu Embankment are numbered as follows: building no. 1 (Pavilion 13), building no. 2 (Pavilion 14), building no. 3 (Operator Block), which communicate with each other, building no. 4 (Pavilion 15), and building no. 5 (Heating Plant), separate from the others, but located in the common courtyard.

Buildings 1, 2, and 4 (Pavilions 13, 14, and 15) were constructed in the early 1900s and are situated as an extension of the current Water Palace. These historically significant structures are located in the city's central area, designed with a basement, ground floor, and first floor. Originally intended for family housing, this layout has influenced the current organization of the hospital. In 1902, the site was first designated as the Sanatorium of the Circular House, and since 1958, it has served as the CFR Hospital.

Building no. 3 (Operator Block) was built later, in 1965, and was designed the same as the other buildings, with a basement, ground floor, and first floor. The building at 1 Gării Street was built on the ruins of the Steel Crown Hotel, bombed during World War II. The buildings located at 13–15 Tudor Vladimirescu Embankment currently house the specialty outpatient clinic (ENT, Ophthalmology, Internal Medicine, Psychiatry, Neurology, Dermatology, General Surgery, Obstetrics and Gynecology, Urology, Cardiology, Pneumology, Diabetes, and Psychology) and the Internal Medicine, General Surgery, ICU, ENT, and Ophthalmology departments.
