= Tresor Le Palais Timișoara =

Tresor Le Palais Timisoara, Curio Collection by Hilton
- Hotel chain: Curio Collection by Hilton

General information
- Type: Hotel
- Location: 18 Radu Tudoran Street, Timișoara, Romania
- Coordinates: 45.7625282°N 21.2748949°E
- Opened: 2004
- Renovated: 2018
- Owner: Tresor Le Palais SRL
- Grounds: 10,000 m^{2} (2.5 acres)

Design and construction
- Architect: Andu Mărginean

Other information
- Number of rooms: 31
- Number of restaurants: 1

Website
- tresorlepalais.ro/en

Tresor Le Palais Timisoara, part of the Curio Collection by Hilton brand, is the first five-star hotel in the western Romanian city of Timișoara. Opened in 2004, it is the first hotel in Romania to operate under this brand.

== History ==
Tresor Le Palais Timisoara was first opened in 2004. After a 6 million euro investment from local businessman Liviu Peter, it was reopened in July 2018. The entire complex covers an area of 10,000 square meters and consists of a hotel, restaurant, conference rooms, spa, and 150-space parking. The architect and designer of the hotel is Andu Mărginean, managing partner at Arthitek Project Lab.

In December 2024, the hotel was reopened under the Curio Collection by Hilton brand, following a franchise agreement with the Hilton group. The consultancy for the affiliation was provided by Est Hospitality. Thus, Tresor Le Palais joined the 40 hotels across Europe operating under this brand.

== Amenities ==
The hotel features an à la carte restaurant, L'Aventure, specializing in Mediterranean cuisine, along with a full-service spa center. L'Aventure is also available for hosting private events or business meetings, accommodating up to 50 guests.

The spa center offers a range of amenities for visitors, including a dry sauna with a Himalayan salt wall, a wet sauna, emotional showers, a relaxation room, and massage services. Additionally, an outdoor swimming pool is set within the hotel's Mediterranean-style garden.

For business and conference needs, the hotel provides two event spaces: Le Grand Opera, which can host between 80 and 450 participants, and Symphonie, suitable for gatherings of 50 to 300 people. A business lounge is also available, ideal for meetings of 10 to 40 attendees.
