= House of Arts, Timișoara =

Coordinates: 45.7569085°N 21.2298914°E

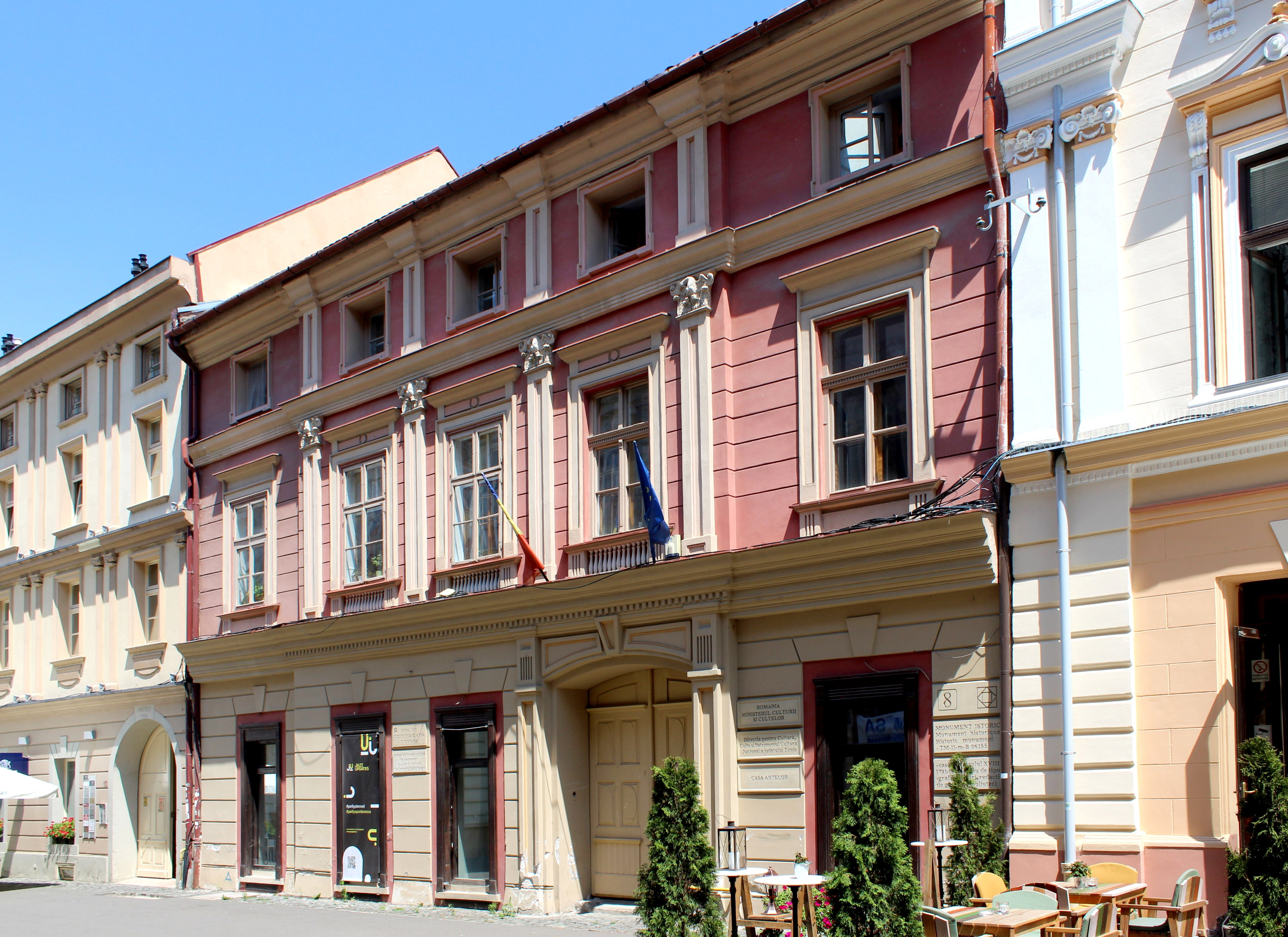
The House of Arts

The House of Arts (Romanian: Casa Artelor) is a historic building in the western Romanian city of Timișoara. Built in 1752, the House of Arts is a historic monument. It originally belonged to Johann Lechner, a civil leatherworker, and in 1828 the owner was Joseph Klobuschitz.

Between 1791 and 1947, the building housed printing presses, publishing houses, newspaper editorial offices, and libraries. In 1888, Heinrich Uhrmann published the Romanian-language weekly Foaia de duminică from this location. Additionally, on 15 March 1815, József Klapka established the first public library in the Habsburg Empire here, which also featured a reading room.

The building was restored by architect Șerban Sturdza and later taken over by the Timiș County Directorate for Culture, under the Ministry of Culture. It now hosts the Pygmalion and Subterana art galleries, the Art Studio, and Café Klapka. These spaces are made available to independent artists free of charge.
