= Martyrs' Church, Timișoara =

Roman Orthodox church in Timișoara, Romania

Martyrs' Church
- Biserica Martirilor

Religion
- Affiliation: Romanian Orthodox
- Patron: Saint Stephen
- Status: Active

Location
- Location: 10A Martyr Dumitru Jugănaru Street, Timișoara, Romania
- Interactive map of Martyrs' Church
- Coordinates: 45°43′49″N 21°13′54″E

Architecture
- Architect: Radu Mihăilescu
- Type: Church
- Style: Modern
- Founder: Ioan Brânzei
- Groundbreaking: 1994
- Completed: 2012

Saint Archdeacon Stephen Church (Romanian: Biserica „Sfântul Arhidiacon Ștefan”), commonly known as Martyrs' Church (Romanian: Biserica Martirilor), is a Romanian Orthodox church in Timișoara, Romania. It was erected in memory of the victims of the 1989 Revolution in Timișoara.

Each year, on the night of December 16–17, marking the anniversary of the outbreak of the 1989 Revolution in Timișoara, vigil services and the Holy Liturgy are held at the Martyrs' Church in honor of the heroes.

== History ==
Construction of the church commenced in 1994, with the architectural design overseen by Radu Mihăilescu. Construction was largely finalized in 2012. In 2008, the church was designated as a monument of public interest in Timișoara.

The interior was painted in the fresco technique by Cezar Ivana from 2012 to 2024.

The church basement houses an urn with the ashes of victims of the 1989 Revolution who were secretly cremated at the Cenușa Crematorium during Operation Rose.

According to the Metropolis of Banat, the church serves 3,521 families with 7,859 believers.

== Architecture ==
The church combines traditional Orthodox elements with modern accents. Its overall layout adheres to the cruciform plan characteristic of Orthodox architecture, with the altar apse oriented toward the east.

The façade features distinct vertical lines, conveying a sense of height and solidity. Stone and concrete are the primary materials, with finishes that mimic natural textures, resulting in a warm yet restrained appearance.

The main entrance is marked by an open porch, supported by sturdy columns inspired by Byzantine architecture. The bell tower is tall and elegantly proportioned, visible from a distance, with a pyramidal roof and decorative turrets.
