= Palace of the Israelite Community =

- Palatul Comunității Israelite
- Interactive map of the Palace of the Israelite Community area

General information
- Architectural style: Secession
- Location: 5 Gheorghe Lazăr Street, Timișoara, Romania
- Coordinates: 45°45′27″N 21°13′34″E
- Construction started: 27 March 1905
- Completed: 30 May 1906

Design and construction
- Architect: Lipót Baumhorn

The Palace of the Israelite Community (Romanian: Palatul Comunității Israelite) is a building in the Cetate district of Timișoara, Romania. It was built in 1906 next to the already existing Cetate Synagogue, in the so-called Judenhof (Jewish Quarter). The Jewish Community of Timișoara still operates here today, along with a kosher restaurant and a small prayer house.

== History ==
The Palace of the Israelite Community was constructed on four plots in the central district of Timișoara, with the building permit granted on 27 March 1905.

The design for the new community headquarters was entrusted to Budapest architect Lipót Baumhorn, who envisioned a grand structure in the Secession style, featuring a commercial ground floor and two additional stories. While the main street-facing facades were adorned with intricate decorations, incorporating geometric, vegetal, and anthropomorphic motifs, the interior facades received a contrasting treatment, with exposed brick that created a dynamic interplay of textures.
