= Gálgon Palace =

- Palatul Gálgon
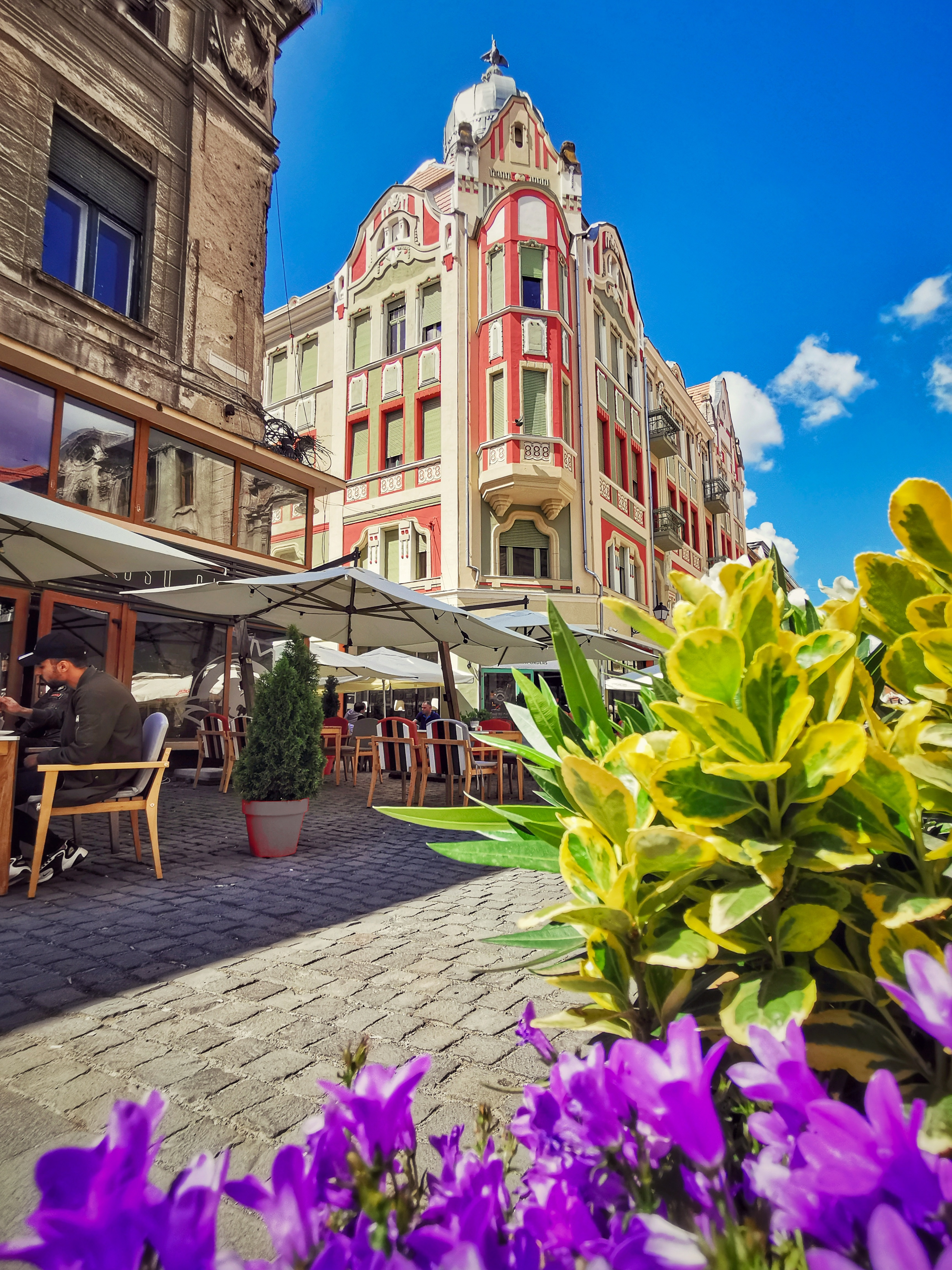
- Interactive map of the Gálgon Palace area
- Alternative names: Rooster Building

General information
- Architectural style: Secession
- Location: 9 Eugene of Savoy Street, Timișoara
- Coordinates: 45°45′23″N 21°13′43″E
- Construction started: 1911
- Completed: 1912

Design and construction
- Architect: Henrik Telkes

Gálgon Palace (Romanian: Palatul Gálgon) is a historical building in Timișoara, Romania. It was built in 1912 in the Secession style, with anthropomorphic and geometric decorations.

== History ==
A house has stood on the site of the current palace with various owners since the first half of the 18th century. In 1752, it was owned by Theresia Demmelmayer, the widow of the chancellor of the administration. According to some records, the building was sold for one million florins in 1817, and four years later, it changed ownership again, with the new owner exchanging it for a property in Macedonia.

In the 1840s, the building became well known for hosting a tavern on the ground floor, named La Cocoșul Negru (Hungarian: Fekete Kakas; "Black Rooster"). In 1845, a wine cellar called La Pisica Neagră (Hungarian: Fekete Macska; "Black Cat") was added to the building.

In the early 1900s, the building was occupied by Gyula Ágoston, a prominent lumber merchant who also owned a grocery store by the same name. In 1911, Ágoston Gálgon, the son of Gyula Gálgon, received a building permit to construct a two-story palace featuring nine apartments and 35 rooms. Designed by architect Henrik Telkes, the palace was finished the following year.

Throughout the 20th century, it housed a hat workshop, a newspaper editorial office, a funeral home, a glass workshop, a clothing store, a hairdresser and a small goods store, and cafes.

== Architecture ==
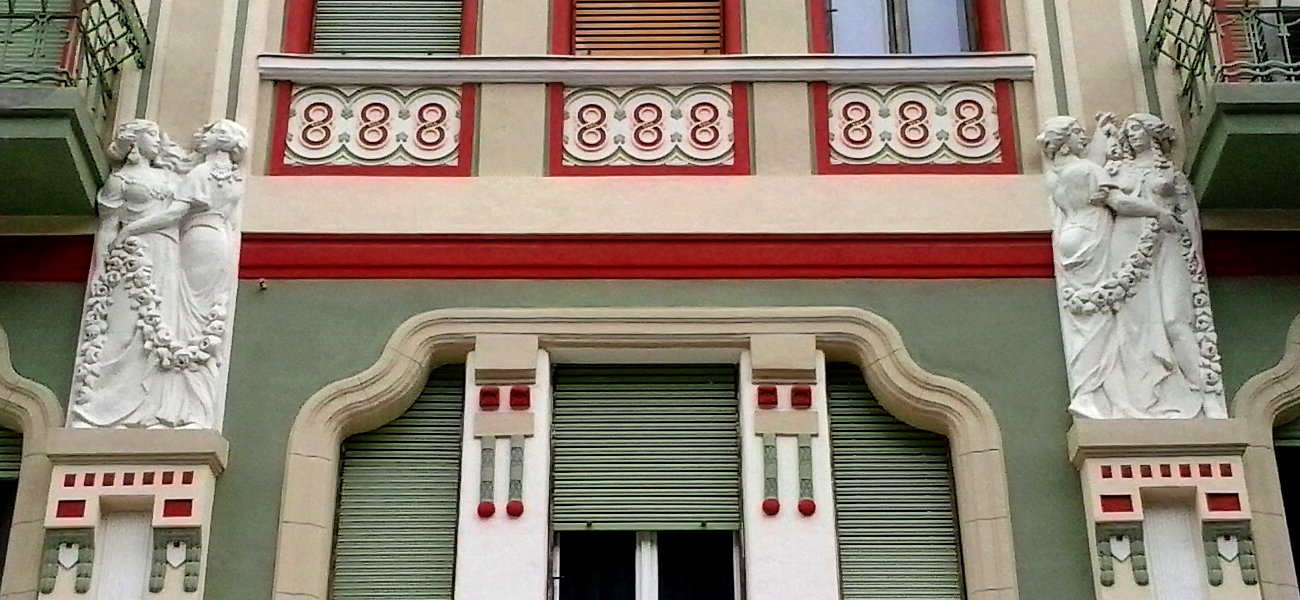
Dancing female figures on the facade

The palace, built in the style of the 1900s (Secession movement), stands out for its dynamic roof and gable structures, as well as the two-story bay window that defines the building's corner. The facade combines geometric elements typical of the late Secession period with anthropomorphic decorations, such as mascarons, which adorn the capitals of the pilasters—characteristic of 1900s architecture. The bas-reliefs on the first floor, depicting female figures in dance poses, are particularly striking. The most iconic feature of the building, however, is the roof finial, designed as a sheet metal rooster.
