= Timișoara Institute of Cardiovascular Diseases =

Institute of Cardiovascular Diseases

Geography
- Location: Timișoara, Romania
- Coordinates: 45°46′8″N 21°15′31″E

Organisation
- Funding: Public hospital
- Type: Specialist

Services
- Beds: 182
- Speciality: Cardiology

History
- Opened: 1993

Links
- Website: cardiologie.ro

Timișoara Institute of Cardiovascular Diseases (Romanian: Institutul de Boli Cardiovasculare) is the only public institute that provides complete cardiology medical care in western Romania, serving a population of two million people. It has 182 beds in all departments.

It was established by Order of the Ministry of Public Health no. 1452 of 4 November 1993. The first open heart surgery in Timișoara took place two years earlier, on 26 April 1991, by a surgical team headed by Ilie Pavelescu and composed of Marian Gașpar, Lucian Petrescu, Ovidiu Nuțu, Ion Țintoiu, and Ovidiu Brânzan (former Minister of Health).

With the commissioning of the third building in 2011, the hospital has a capacity of 1,500 surgeries per year.
