= Agrarian Bank Palace, Timișoara =

Agrarian Bank Palace
- Palatul Băncii Agrare
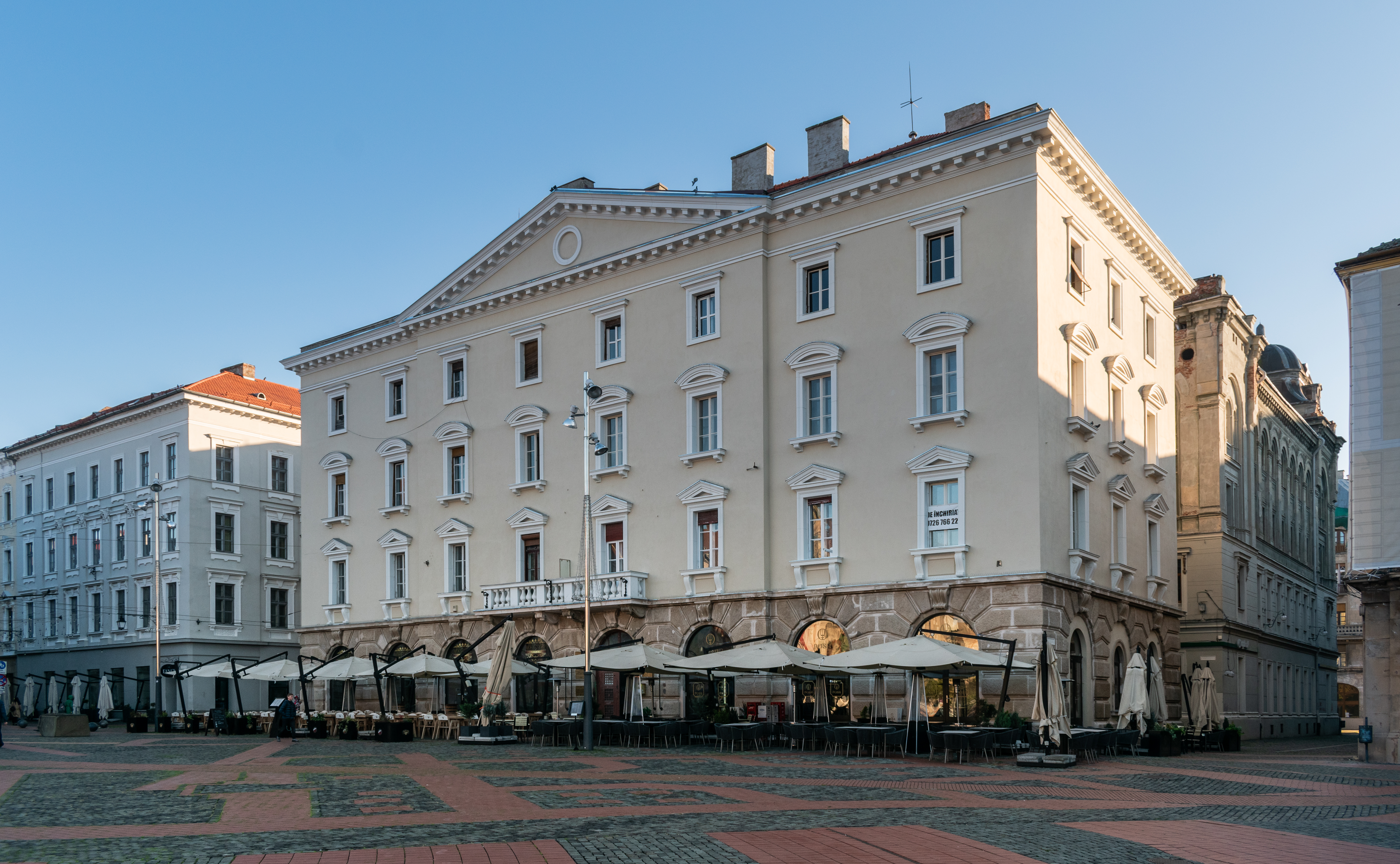
- Interactive map of the Agrarian Bank Palace area

General information
- Architectural style: Renaissance-Eclectic (1901); Modern (1934)
- Location: Liberty Square, Timișoara
- Coordinates: 45°45′20″N 21°13′40″E
- Completed: 1901
- Renovated: 1934

Design and construction
- Architect: Karl May

Renovating team
- Architect: Konrad Richter

The Agrarian Bank Palace (Romanian: Palatul Băncii Agrare) is a historic building in Liberty Square, Timișoara, Romania. Designed by Karl May as the headquarters of the Agrarian Savings Bank (Hungarian: Agrár Takarékpénztár; founded in 1869) and built in 1901, the building's façade was reconstructed in 1934 in the modern style by architect Konrad Richter. Subsequently, the building housed the Corvina bookstore, the Italian bank, the consulate, and later the CEC Bank.

== Architecture ==
The building exemplifies the modern interwar style, featuring a symmetrical façade with evenly arranged windows highlighted by pronounced decorative frames. A central triangular pediment, characteristic of classical architecture, crowns the composition and incorporates a circular ornamental element at its center. Vertical pilasters and the rusticated ground floor enhance the structure's solid and monumental appearance—an aspect commonly encountered in early 20th-century administrative and banking architecture, intended to convey a sense of stability and prestige.
