= Jecza Gallery =

Coordinates: 45.727873°N 21.2381153°E

Jecza Gallery, located in Timișoara, Romania, is among the country's most respected art galleries outside Bucharest. Established in 2011 as a family venture by Sorina Ianovici-Jecza and Andrei Jecza, the gallery focuses on contemporary art spanning from the 1960s to today. It manages and promotes the artistic legacy of sculptor Péter Jecza.

== History ==
Jecza Gallery was founded initially as a family business in 2011 by Sorina Ianovici-Jecza and Andrei Jecza. The gallery had from the outset a strong propensity for the local art scene, very important in the 1960s and 1970s (the Sigma group among others).

Together with an art foundation and a publishing house established in 2001, the gallery has evolved into a prominent research hub dedicated to the legacy of modern and contemporary art in Eastern Europe.

In 2018, Andrei Jecza assumed leadership of the gallery, rebranding it while expanding its exhibition program and artist portfolio.

In 2025, it opened a second space in Bucharest with the exhibition of contemporary Romanian painter Marius Bercea. In the same year, three vintage photographic collages by Iosif Király were acquired by MoMA from the Jecza Gallery.

== Represented artists ==
Notable artists represented by the gallery include:

- Constantin Flondor (b. 1936)
- Péter Jecza (1939–2009)
- Iosif Király (b. 1957)
- Zoltán Molnár (1937–2001)
- Paul Neagu (1938–2004)
- Doru Tulcan (b. 1943)
