= Nägele Palace =

- Palatul Nägele
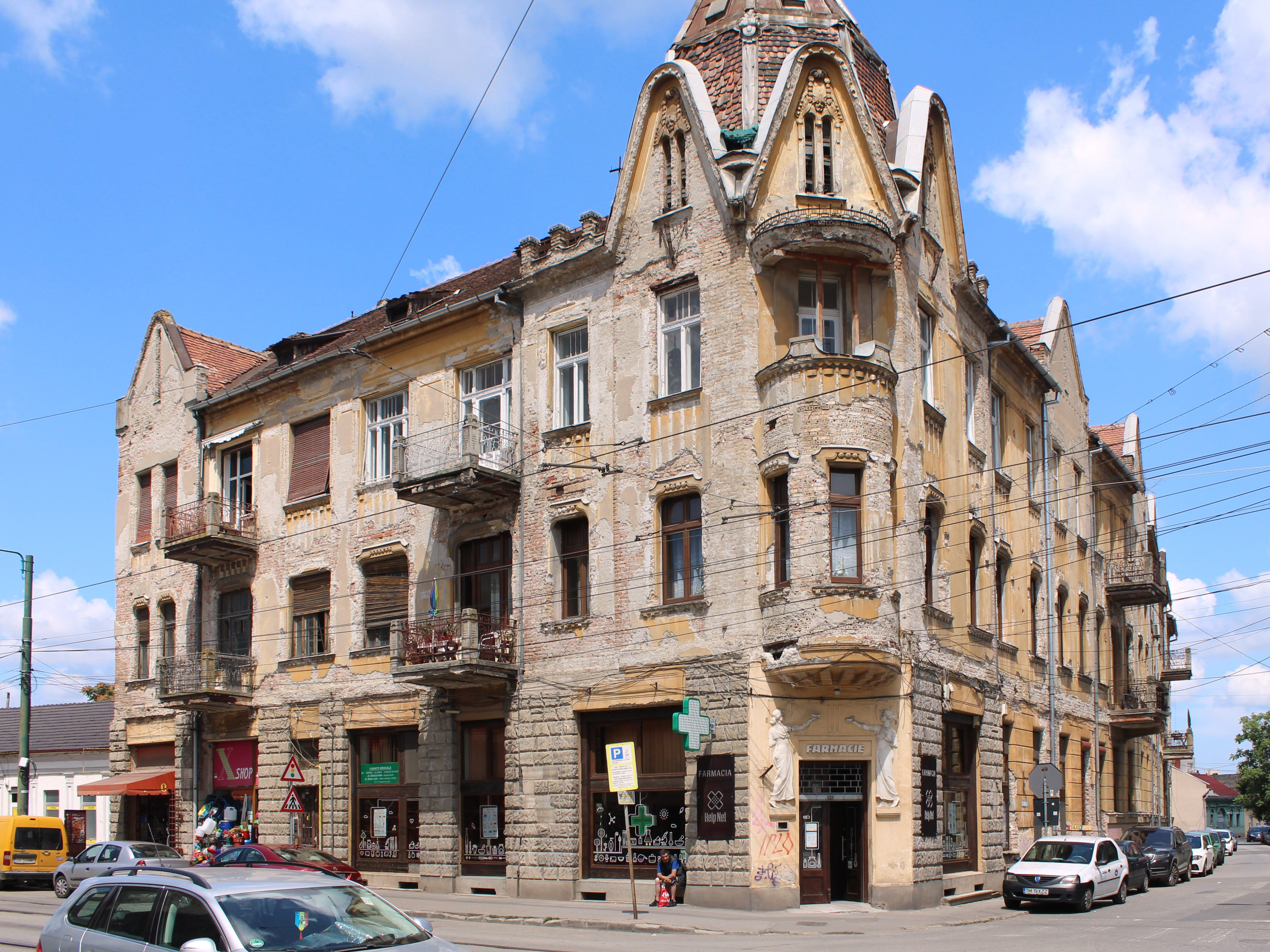
- Interactive map of the Nägele Palace area
- Alternative names: Kovács Palace

General information
- Architectural style: Secession
- Location: Timișoara, Romania
- Coordinates: 45°45′34″N 21°14′59″E
- Construction started: 1910
- Completed: 1911

Design and construction
- Architect: Henrik Telkes

The Nägele Palace (Romanian: Palatul Nägele) is a historical monument in the Fabric district of Timișoara, Romania. It was built by pharmacist Antal Nägele on the site of an older pharmacy. In 1917 it was bought by pharmacist Aladár Kovács, being even today known as Kovács Pharmacy (Romanian: Farmacia Kovács).

== History ==
On the site where the palace was built, on Fő utca (Hungarian for Main Street, today's Dacians' Street), Franz (Ferenc) Hönig's Holy Trinity pharmacy (German: Zur Heiligen Dreifaltigkeit; Hungarian: A Szentháromsághoz; Romanian: La Sfânta Treime) operated since 1873, when he had obtained the right to establish a pharmacy through a contest with three participants. The pharmacy successively belonged to several pharmacists: Alexander (Sándor) Supp (1891–1893), Eduard (Ede) Feigl (1893–1894), Ernest (Ernő) Weinrich (Vida) (1894–1898) and Ignác Neumann (Németh) (1898–1905), respectively. In 1905 Antal Nägele bought the pharmacy, and in 1910 he hired Henrik Telkes to build the current building.

The palace is named after Aladár Kovács who bought both the building and the pharmacy from Nägele in 1917. Even today, a pharmacy still operates on the ground floor of the palace.

== Architecture ==
The two-story building is made in the so-called "1900s style", the Secession current. Its decorations are typical for the last and most evolved phase, the "geometric" phase, of this style. The entrance to the building is framed by two bas-reliefs representing female figures offering mortars with pharmaceutical preparations. Above the entrance rises a tower with three high gables and covered with a conical roof, on the top of which is the rod of Asclepius (but with two coiled snakes, a confusion with the caduceus common in the era).
