= Jewish Cemetery, Timișoara =

Jewish Cemetery
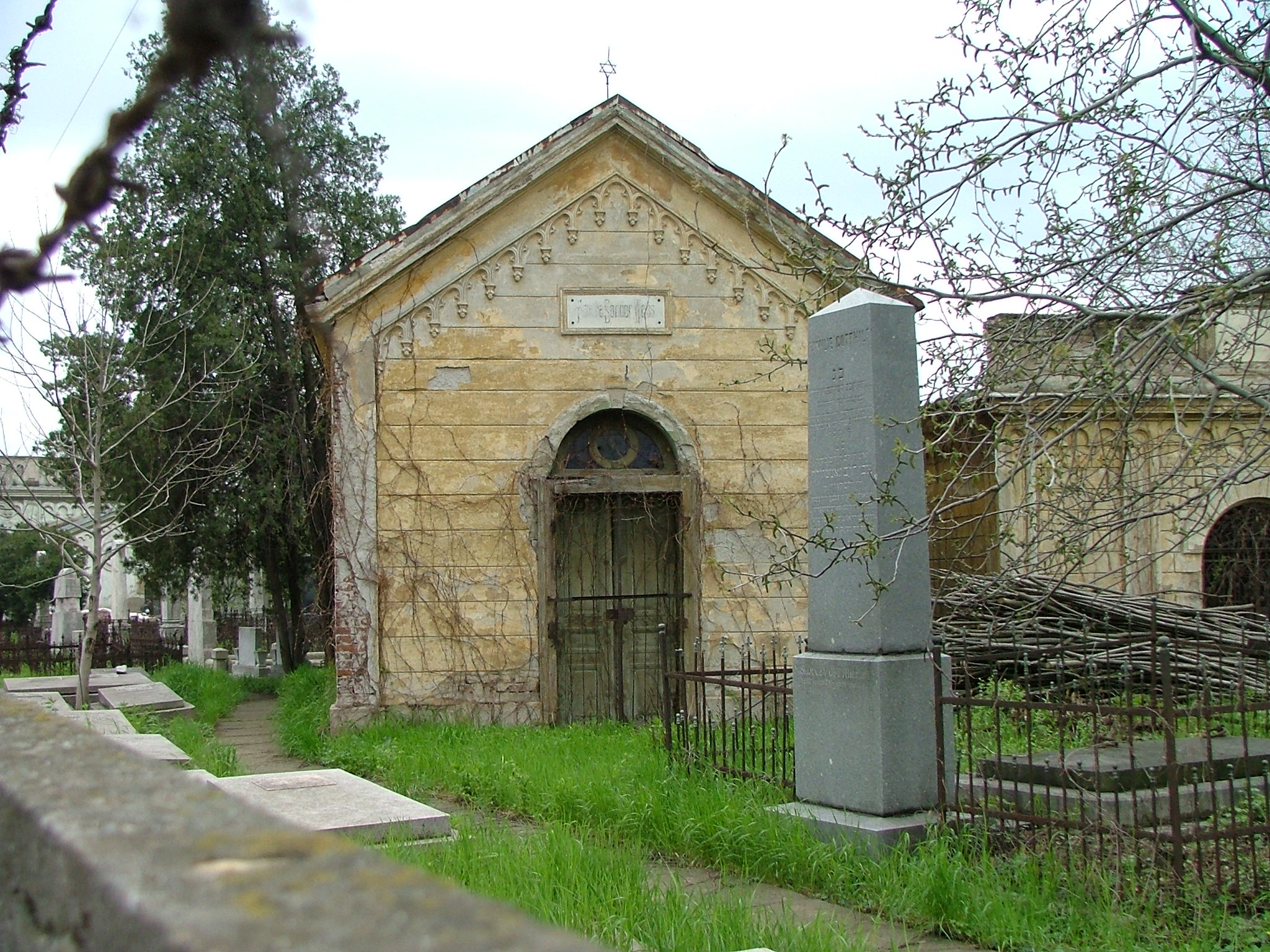

Details
- Established: 17th century
- Location: Timișoara, Romania
- Coordinates: 45°46′19″N 21°13′46″E
- Type: Jewish
- Size: 8 ha
- No. of graves: 14,250

The Jewish Cemetery is one of the oldest cemeteries in Timișoara, Romania, being the main Jewish cemetery in the city. There is another Jewish cemetery on Aleea Viilor, but it is no longer functional and is much smaller in size.

== Location ==
The cemetery is situated in the Lipovei district, with its main entrance facing the eastern side, on Calea Sever Bocu (formerly known as Calea Lipovei). It is bordered to the south by the Poor Cemetery and to the north and west by Liniștei Street.

== History ==
Jews have been present in Timișoara since 1515, when they settled there following the Alhambra Decree, which expelled Jews from Spain. The community grew during the Ottoman occupation of Banat, as Sephardic Jews from the Ottoman Empire, particularly from Constantinople and Thessaloniki, migrated to the area. Their presence is also documented in the surrender records of Timișoara in 1716, when the Ottoman fortress commander negotiated with Eugene of Savoy. At that time, there were 144 Jews living in the city.

The oldest grave in the cemetery, dating back to 1636, belongs to Assael Azriel, a Sephardic Jew from Thessaloniki. Rabbi Jakab Singer speculated that he may have been both a rabbi and a physician, although this remains uncertain, as the tombstone inscription does not explicitly confirm this.

The inscriptions on the older tombstones are in Hebrew, gradually becoming bilingual in the 19th century as the city administration changed. Initially, they were in Hebrew and German, later shifting to Hebrew and Hungarian, and eventually to Hebrew and Romanian.

In the 2000s, the Jewish cemetery became the center of controversy. At one point, sections of the cemetery were divided and sold for $271,800 and $240,000, respectively, by employees of the Land Registry. Investigations later revealed that the delegation involved in these transactions, which were signed by the Chief Rabbi of the Jewish Community of Timișoara, was fraudulent.

== Description ==
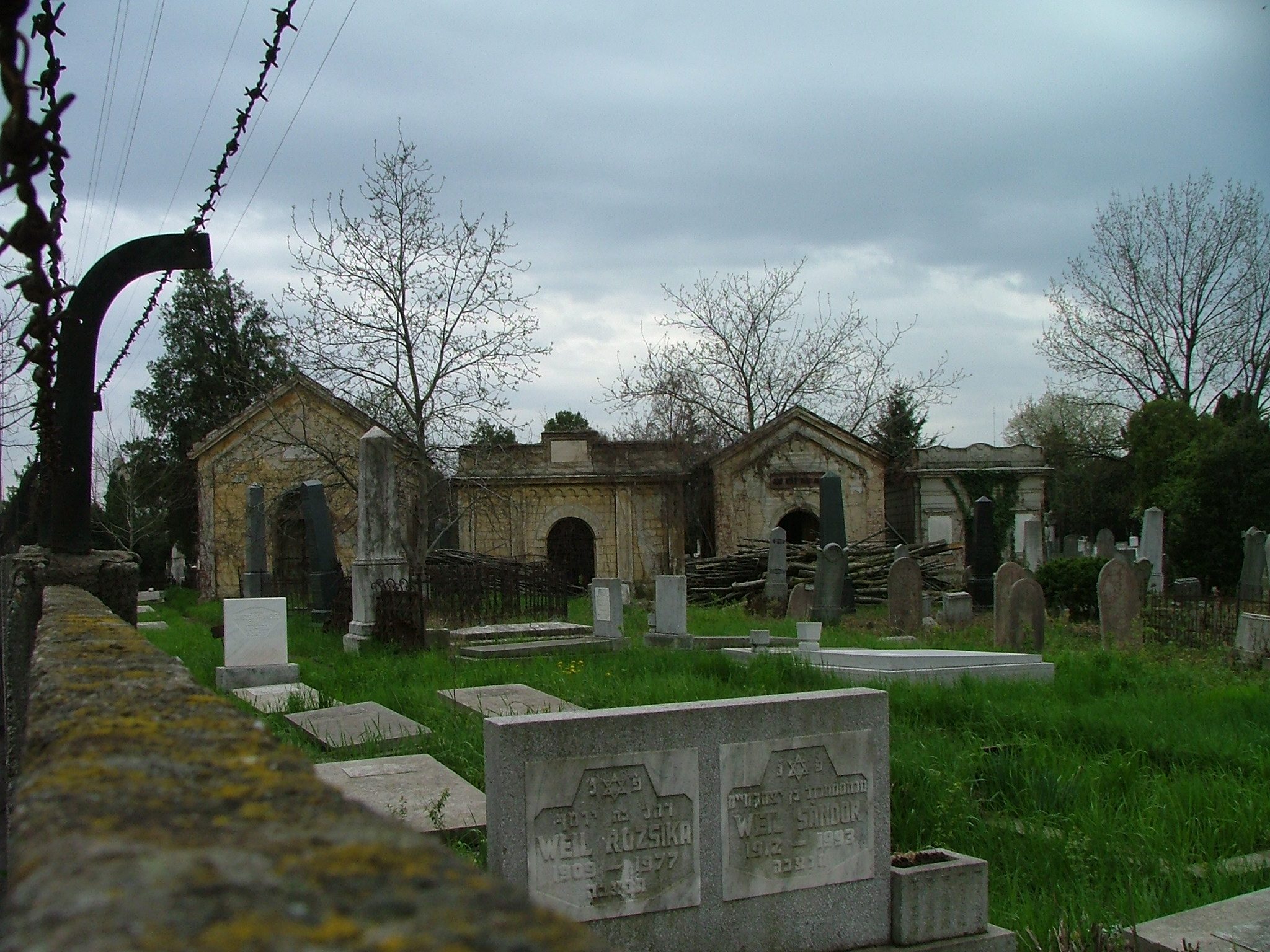
The Jewish Cemetery in Timișoara contains more than 14,000 tombstones.

The cemetery is divided into two sections: the older one, situated to the right upon entering, and the newer section. It spans eight hectares, with graves occupying 5.3 hectares. There are approximately 14,000 graves, 81 crypts, and a chapel. The chapel, designed in the Moorish style typical of late 19th-century Jewish buildings, consists of three rooms: a spacious hall for funeral ceremonies, a wake room, and a mortuary room for washing the deceased. The large hall is notable for its faint map of the old cemetery and its wrought iron chandelier. Adjacent to the chapel is the residence of the guard and caretaker. On the frontispiece of the chapel is inscribed the following text, which refers to verse 4 of chapter 32 of Deuteronomy:

Hebrew

לכבוד צור תמים בכל פועלו נבנה הבית הזה בשם ברוך דיין אמת

English

This place was erected for the glory of His deeds, in the blessed name of the true judge.

On the chapel wall, there is a plaque listing the names of 28 Jews from Timișoara who perished during the Holocaust. Across from it stands a commemorative stele dedicated to the Jews who were killed in World War II, beneath which is a box of soap reportedly made by the Nazis from the fat of Jews.

The tomb of Rabbi Zwi ben David Oppenheim is a site of pilgrimage for people of all faiths, believed to perform miracles. The legend stems from a story told by Rabbi Jakab Singer, in which a Christian cemetery guard, who survived World War I unharmed, credited his survival to the rabbi's powers, despite the rabbi having died more than 50 years earlier.

== Notable interments ==
- Leopold Fleischer (1886–1955), hebraist
- Samuel Kastriener (1871–1937), journalist, editor, and translator
- Moritz Löwy (1854–1908), rabbi
- Maria Neumann (1905–2003), mathematician
- Ernest Neumann (1917–2004), rabbi
- Bernát Schück (1872–1941), rabbi
- Jakab Singer (1867–1939), rabbi and orientalist
- Sigismund Szana (1870–1929), businessman, banker, and philanthropist
- Henrik Telkes (1881–1964), architect
