= Pius Brînzeu County Hospital =

Pius Brînzeu County Emergency Clinical Hospital
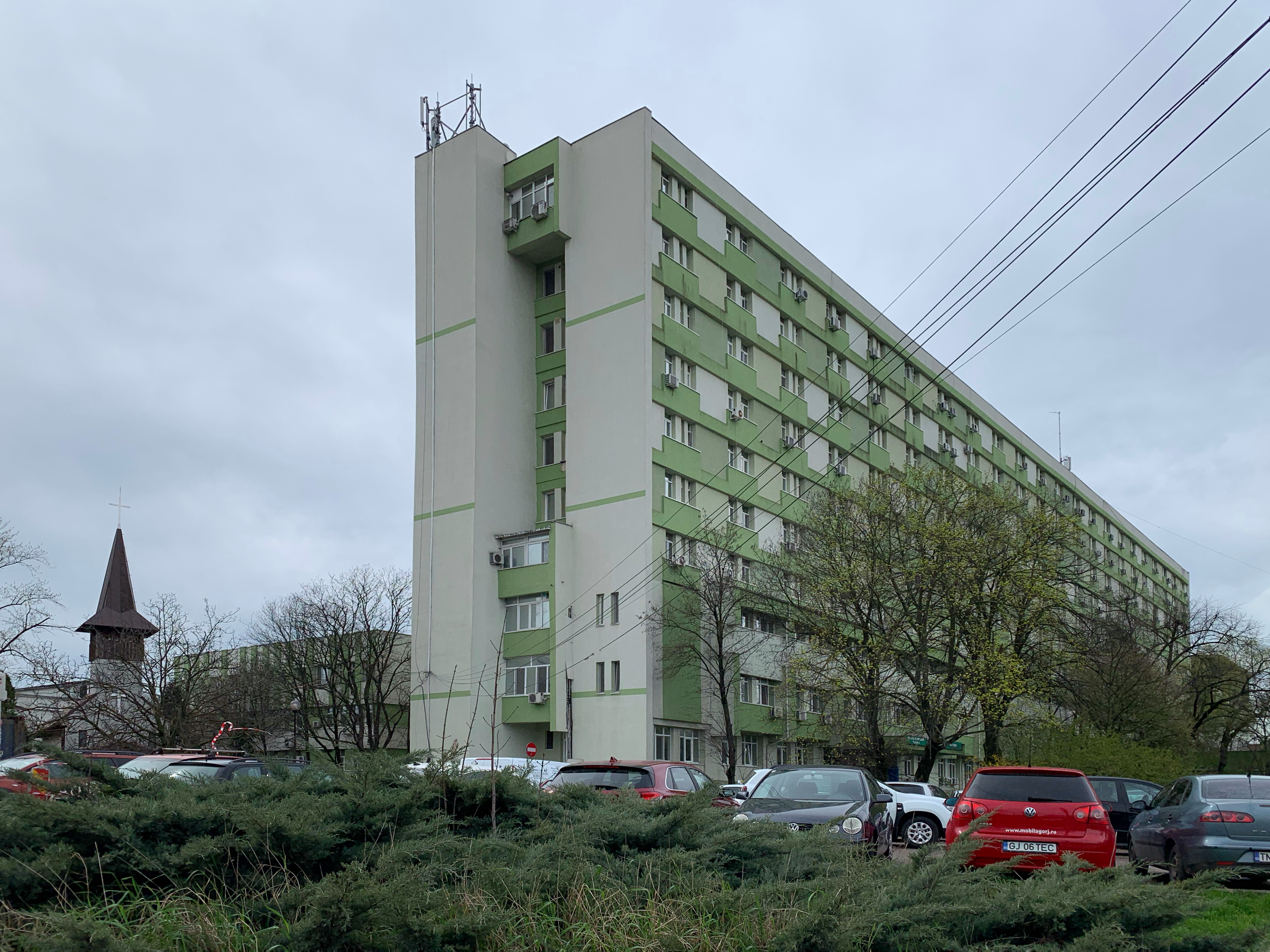

Geography
- Location: Timișoara, Romania
- Coordinates: 45°44′12″N 21°14′31″E

Organisation
- Type: General

Services
- Emergency department: Yes

History
- Construction started: 1970
- Opened: 1974

Links
- Website: www.hosptm.ro

Pius Brînzeu County Emergency Clinical Hospital (Romanian: Spitalul Clinic Județean de Urgență „Pius Brînzeu”) is a public hospital in Timișoara, Romania. It is the largest hospital in the west of the country. It is classified in class I of competence by the Ministry of Health.

== History ==
The history of the Timișoara County Clinical Hospital dates back to the early 1970s, when communist authorities recognized the urgent need to establish a modern medical facility in Timișoara to serve patients throughout Timiș County. This became possible thanks to key figures in Timișoara's medical community, including Pius Brînzeu, Ștefan Gavrilescu, Ion Lighezan, and Ferdinand Nistor, among others.

Designed by architect Nicolae Dancu, construction of the new County Clinical Hospital began in 1970. The works were completed four years later, when it began its activity with 1,030 beds and 13 clinical departments.

The 1970s marked the emergence of a genuine medical school in Banat, with its achievements becoming evident a decade later, in the 1980s. During this time, Timișoara saw Romania's first kidney transplants, the introduction of urological endoscopy, the advancement of digestive tract endoscopy, and the ongoing work of the Pacemaker Implant Center, among other developments. Following the 1989 Revolution, during the 1990s, the Department of Computed Tomography was established, ultrasound diagnostics were significantly expanded, endoscopic surgery grew, and other advancements were made.

The 21st century marks a period of growth for the County Hospital, with the development of its infrastructure, including the establishment of the new Orthopedics Clinic and the construction of the Casa Austria Traumatology Center.

== Departments ==
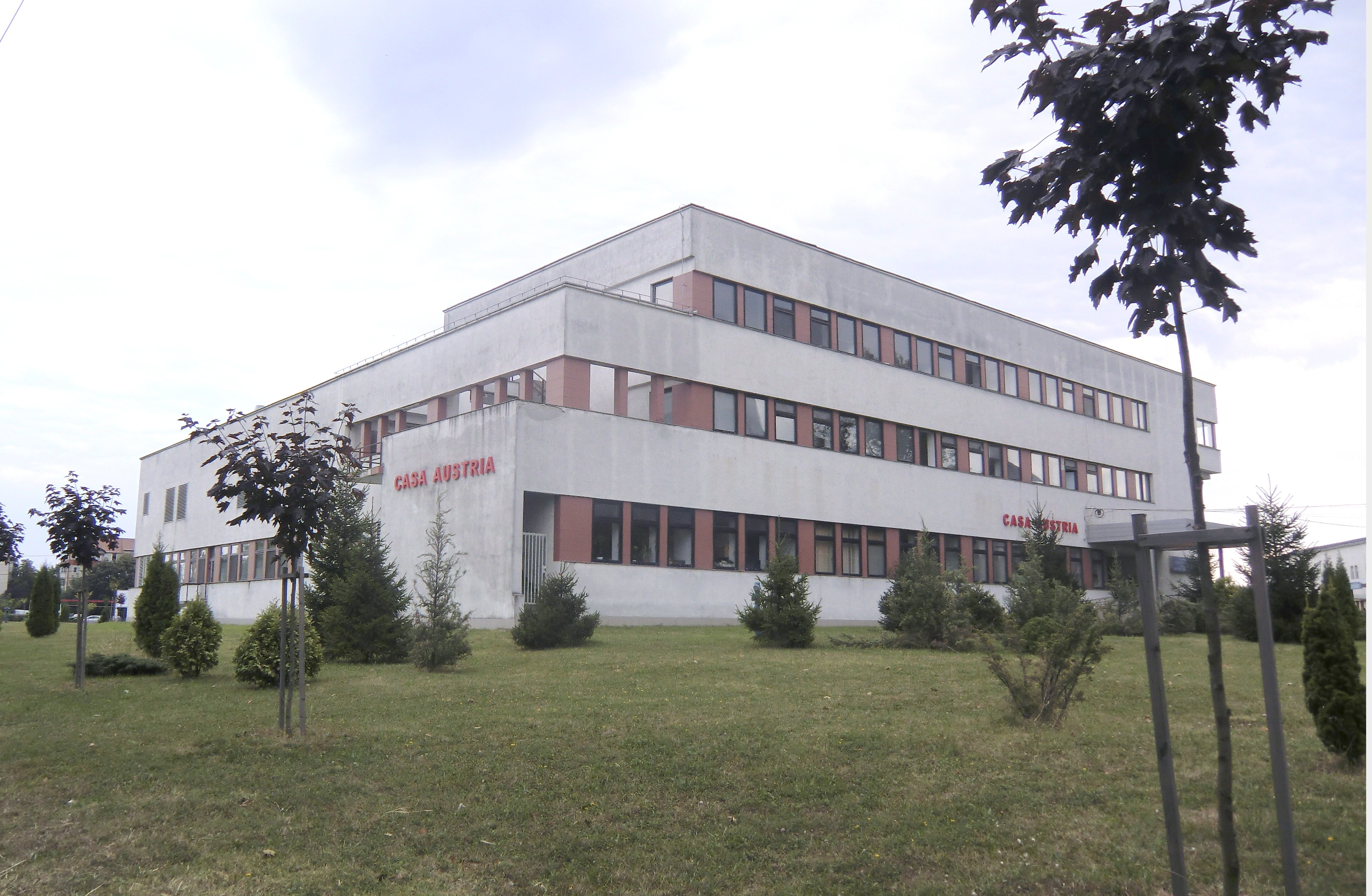
Casa Austria

The main building contains 13 university clinics along with the Orthopedics Clinic, while the Obstetrics-Gynecology and Neonatology Clinic, Pediatrics Clinic, Psychiatry Clinic, and Mental Health Center are spread throughout the city. Adjacent to it is the Casa Austria Traumatology Center (established in 2003) and the OncoGen Center for Gene and Cellular Therapies in Cancer Treatment (opened in 2015).
