= Students' Church, Timișoara =

Romanian Orthodox church in Timișoara, Romania

Students' Church
- Biserica Studenților

Religion
- Affiliation: Romanian Orthodox
- Patron: Annunciation of the Lord
- Status: Active

Location
- Location: 2 Cluj Street, Timișoara, Romania
- Interactive map of Students' Church
- Coordinates: 45°44′50″N 21°14′2″E

Architecture
- Type: Church
- Style: Neo-Byzantine
- Funded by: Traian Mirică
- Groundbreaking: 1995

The Students' Church (Romanian: Biserica Studenților) is a Romanian Orthodox church in Timișoara, Romania. It is situated on the West University campus and is designed primarily for students from the university community in Timișoara.

== History ==
The church's foundation stone was set in 1995. With the building still under construction, services have taken place in the basement since 1996, where a small church-goods shop is located as well. Its primary benefactor was Traian Mirică, who died in 1993.

The church is built in a neo-Byzantine style and features a spring dedicated to the Virgin Mary located beside its side apse. It is part of a larger complex consisting of four structures: Body A—the church itself; Bodies B and C—housing an auditorium, library, and other facilities; and Body D—which includes a medical center, computer room, open chapel, and additional spaces.
