= Savoy Hotel Timișoara =

Savoy Hotel
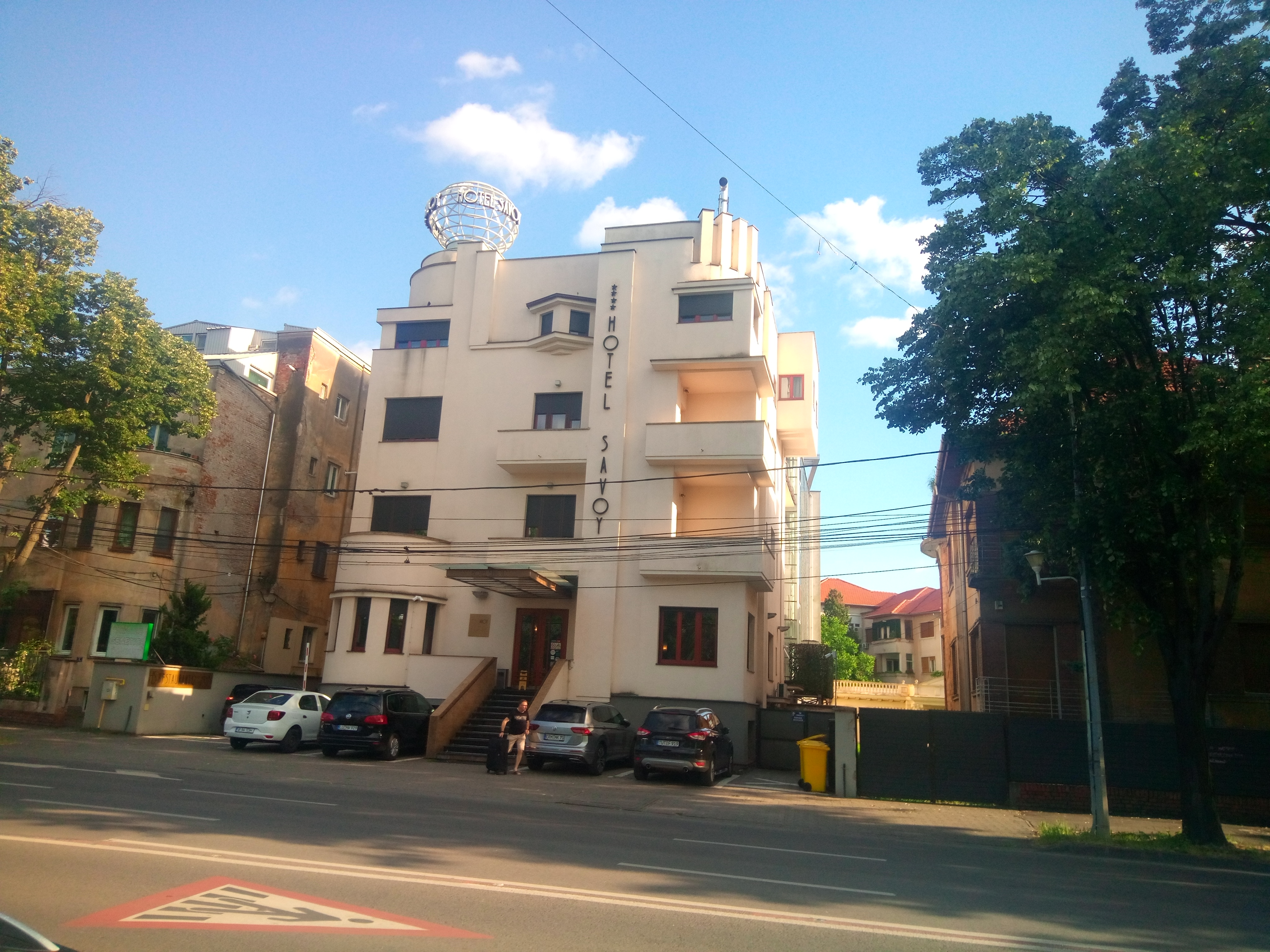
- Interactive map of the Savoy Hotel area
- Alternative names: Constantin Purcariu Villa

General information
- Type: Hotel
- Architectural style: International/Modernist
- Location: 2 Splaiul Tudor Vladimirescu, Timișoara, Romania
- Coordinates: 45°44′52″N 21°13′27″E
- Construction started: 1934
- Completed: 1935
- Renovated: 2005

Design and construction
- Architect: Albert Kristóf-Krausz

Other information
- Number of rooms: 55
- Number of restaurants: 1
- Number of bars: 1

Website
- www.hotelsavoytimisoara.ro

Savoy Hotel, arranged in a modernist villa from 1935, is a four-star hotel in the western Romanian city of Timișoara.

== History ==
Savoy Hotel is housed in the former Constantin Purcariu Villa, a modernist villa from the interwar period situated behind Alpinet Park. The building permit was granted on 1 April 1934 to Constantin Purcariu, a prominent builder in interwar-era Timișoara.

== Architecture ==
The building was designed by renowned local architect Albert Kristóf-Krausz, who skillfully integrated morphological elements characteristic of modernist architecture into a sophisticated composition defined by vertical accents. The interplay of simple geometric volumes creates a visually complex structure, though it no longer retains the original textures and finishes typical of the modernist style.

== Amenities ==
The hotel offers 55 rooms in total, including two studios and two apartments. It also features two meeting rooms with a combined capacity of 71 guests. On-site amenities include a restaurant serving classic cuisine, a cocktail bar, a sauna, and a fitness room.
