= Șari-Neni =

Interwar Romanian brothel

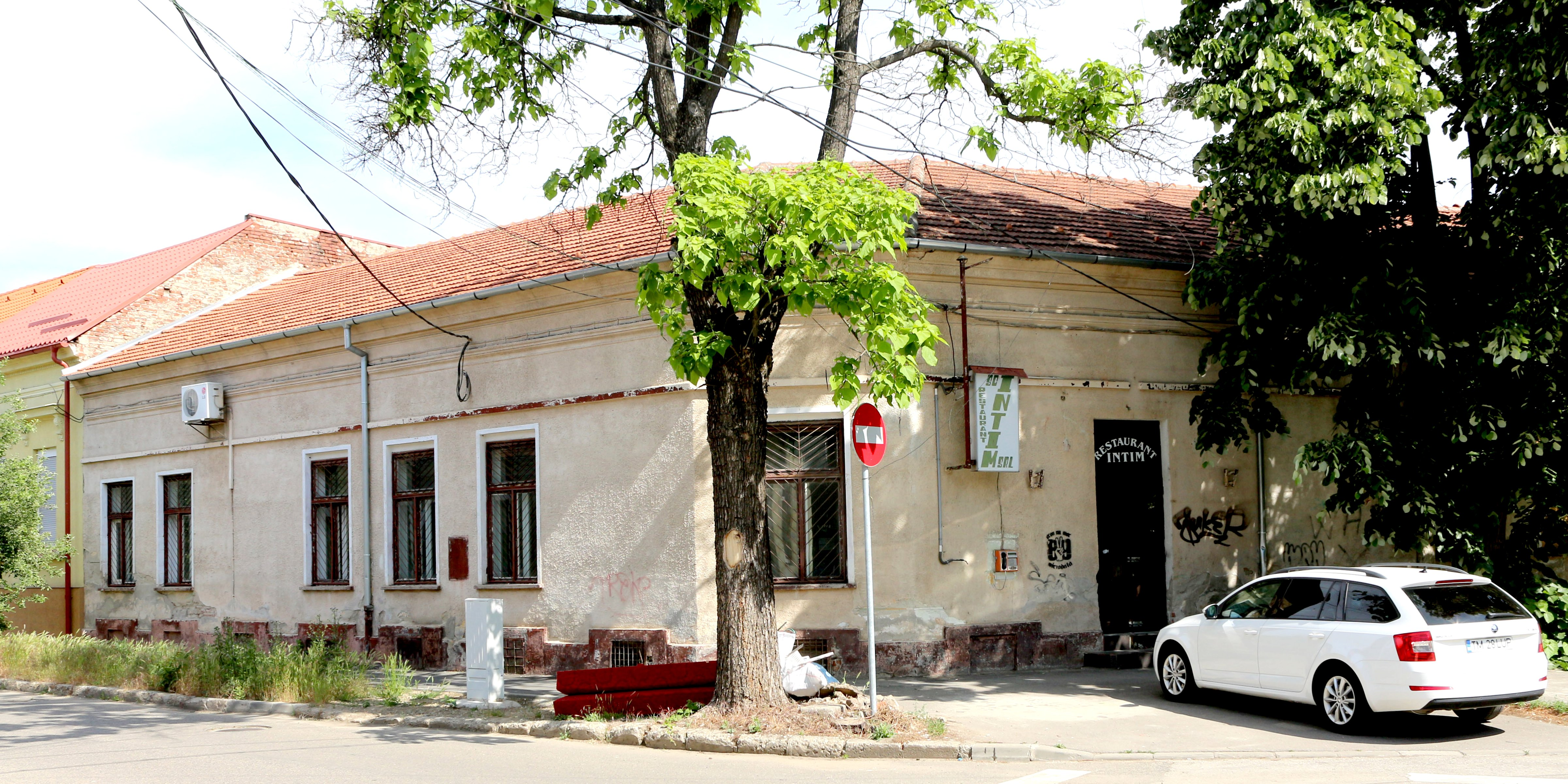
Șari-Neni building in 2020

Șari-Neni (Note: Sári néni ("Aunt Sári") is a Hungarian hypocorism for Charlotta Földessy, the owner of the brothel in the interwar period.) was a famous brothel in the Elisabetin district of Timișoara, Romania, during the interwar period. It was located at the intersection of the current Romulus and Alexandru Odobescu streets.

== History ==
Prostitution was legal at the beginning of the 1900s, and several luxury brothels and so-called houses of tolerance were operating legally in Timișoara. The latter were located in marginal neighborhoods, for those with lower incomes.

The brothel, which had a red lantern by the entrance, was run by a fierce lady called Charlotta Földessy (1885–1962). (Note: Other sources give the surname as Mohács.) It had the outward appearance of a chic and intimate restaurant which served fine food. The clients were treated well and the service was impeccable. The clients were able to choose a companion from albums of professional photographs. The employees could play the piano and were well-versed in the art of conversation. Many of the clientele were regular visitors.

After World War II, prostitution was outlawed by the communist regime and the brothel closed. The building was used as a buffet. Soon after the Romanian Revolution, the building re-opened as a restaurant with live music called Intim. In the 2000s the restaurant closed and the building fell into disrepair. Unable to sell the property, the owners tried to sell the property to the local council on several occasions between 2014 and 2019.
