= Ana Aslan National College (Timișoara) =

- Colegiul Național „Ana Aslan”

Location
- 15A 1989 Revolution Boulevard, Timișoara
- Coordinates: 45°45′21″N 21°14′8″E

Information
- Former name: Institute of Nursing Assistants
- Type: High school, post-secondary school
- Established: 1942
- Authority: Ministry of National Education
- Principal: Adriana Sopon
- Staff: 82
- Language: Romanian
- Colors: White and red
- Website: cnanaaslan-tm.ro

Ana Aslan National College is a high school in Timișoara named after Romanian gerontologist Ana Aslan. It also features a post-secondary school that educates students in the field of nursing.

== History ==
Ana Aslan College is the successor to the former Institute of Nursing Assistants, established in 1942, with a three-year study program. It was transformed into a sanitary high school in 1948 – feldshers, with a four-year study program. In 1959 the sanitary high school was abolished, and the post-secondary school was transferred to the Sanitary Technical School in Arad, until 1972. Since 1972, as a result of the reorganization, the institution has been transformed into a sanitary school group, with two forms of organization: high school and post-secondary school. It functioned again as a sanitary high school between 1978 and 1990. In 1992, the high school became a school group again, and in 1996 it became a college; it got its current name in 1999.

The current building in which the college operates was built in 1950.
