= Emmer Palace =

- Palatul Emmer
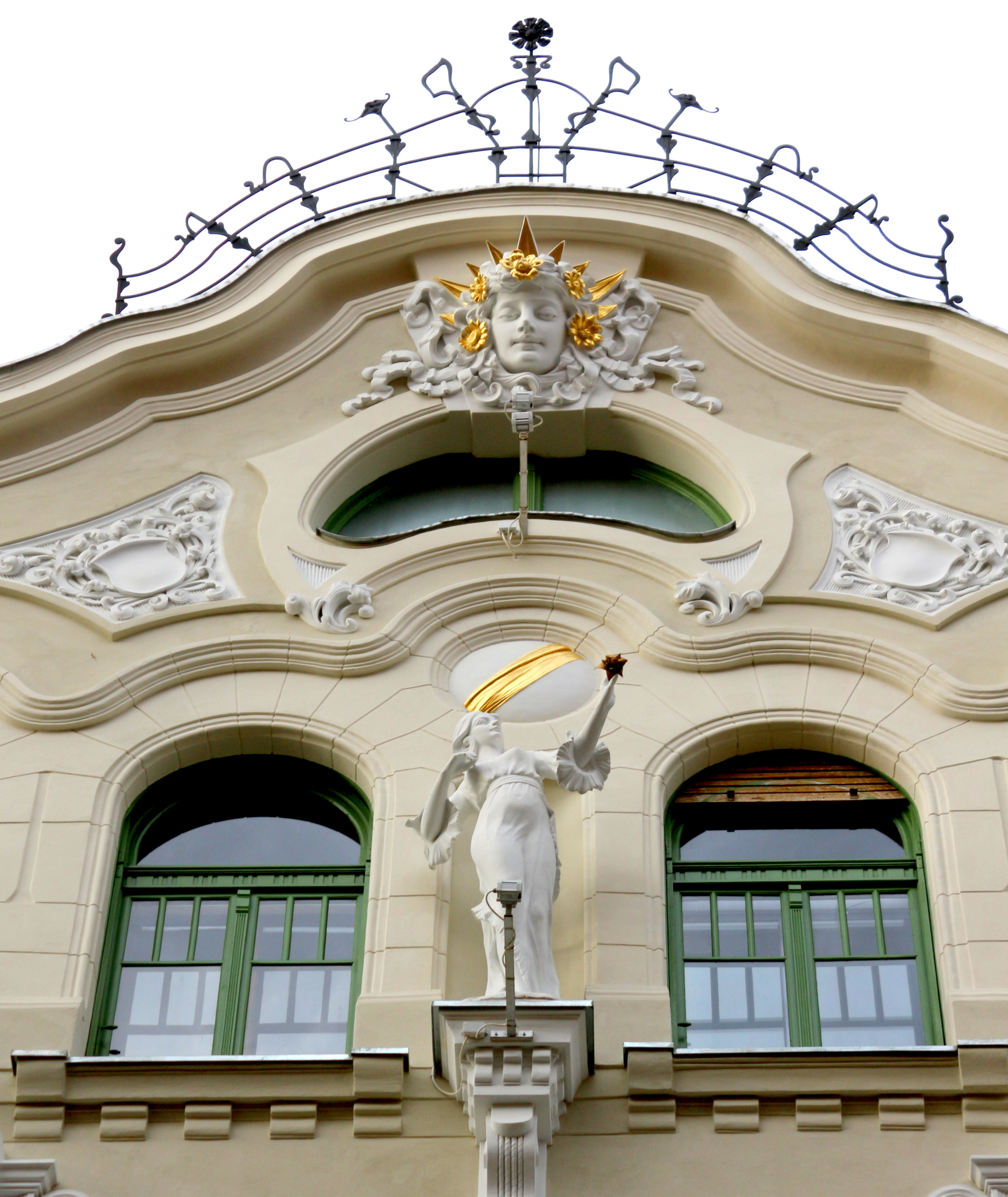
- Architectural details of the middle facade
- Interactive map of the Emmer Palace area

General information
- Architectural style: Art Nouveau
- Location: 7 Florimond Mercy Street, Timișoara
- Coordinates: 45°45′25″N 21°13′43″E
- Construction started: 1906
- Completed: 1907
- Renovated: 2023

Design and construction
- Architect: László Székely

Emmer Palace (Romanian: Palatul Emmer) is a historical building in the Cetate district of Timișoara, Romania. It is the only building built in the French Art Nouveau style in Timișoara.

== History ==
The palace belonged to the hat and arms merchant Ferencz Emmer. He already owned a company in Timișoara since 1876. In 1905, together with his wife Jozefina and Vilmos Bieder, he bought from Antónia Mayer the house lot on Mercy Street. A year later, he obtained a building permit for a two-story palace with eight apartments, 30 rooms, two commercial spaces, and two warehouses.

From the beginning, the building was designed with commercial spaces on the ground floor, a feature that has been preserved even today. Now it houses a bookstore, restaurants, lawyers' and notaries' offices, and housing.

Like other buildings of this type in Timișoara, it was traded between several owners, after the war it was nationalized and transformed into social housing. At the same time, the spaces on the ground floor were mutilated by dismantling the wooden showcases and changing the dimensions of the gaps. After 2000, the ownership regime changed again, the building passed into private ownership, becoming a condominium. It was completely restored between May 2020 and October 2023.

== Architecture ==
The building, designed in the French Art Nouveau style by the chief architect of Timișoara at the time, László Székely, attracts through the compositional coherence of the facade. The leitmotif of the sinuous line generates every register of the facade, from the outline of the pediments to the window frames and to the details of the ironmongery of the access gate. The facade has three parts, the higher sides with three windows in the upper part and the middle part, lower, with four windows per floor and a statue is also located on the top floor. The central motif of a woman's face, often found in Timișoara's plastic from the beginning of the 20th century, is also noticeable at the Emmer Palace. Great attention was also paid to the interior of the building, with a richly decorated niche in the stairwell.
