= Calea Stan Vidrighin =

Street in Timișoara, Romania

- Former name(s): Calea Buziașului
- Maintained by: Timișoara City Hall
- Length: 1,983.19 m (6,506.5 ft)
- Location: Buziașului, Timișoara, Romania
- Coordinates: 45.741757°N 21.255965°E
- From: Banatim
- To: Gheorghe Domășnean Square

Calea Stan Vidrighin is a boulevard in the southeastern industrial district of Buziașului in Timișoara, Romania. It is named after Stan Vidrighin (1876–1956), the first Romanian mayor of Timișoara.

== History ==
Until 1919, the boulevard was known as Calea Buziașului, functioning primarily as a route toward the nearby spa town of Buziaș. Following the reintegration of Banat into Romania in 1919, it was renamed Calea Stan Vidrighin in honor of the city's first Romanian mayor after the union, Stan Vidrighin (1876–1956). Over the decades, the area surrounding the boulevard transformed from agrarian outskirts into a working-class, industrial district (Buziașului), before recent regeneration efforts brought modern mixed‑use development to the area.

The entire boulevard was modernized through a project partially financed by European funds carried out between April 2022 and September 2024, which included, among other things, the modernization of the tram line, the rehabilitation of the existing road system and sidewalks on both sides of the boulevard, and the arrangement of a bicycle path of almost 3.4 kilometers. The boulevard's modernization also involved extensive upgrades to the underground networks for electricity, traffic signals, gas, and telecommunications.
