= Cross Obelisk, Timișoara =

Monument in Romania

Cross Obelisk
- Obeliscul cu Cruce
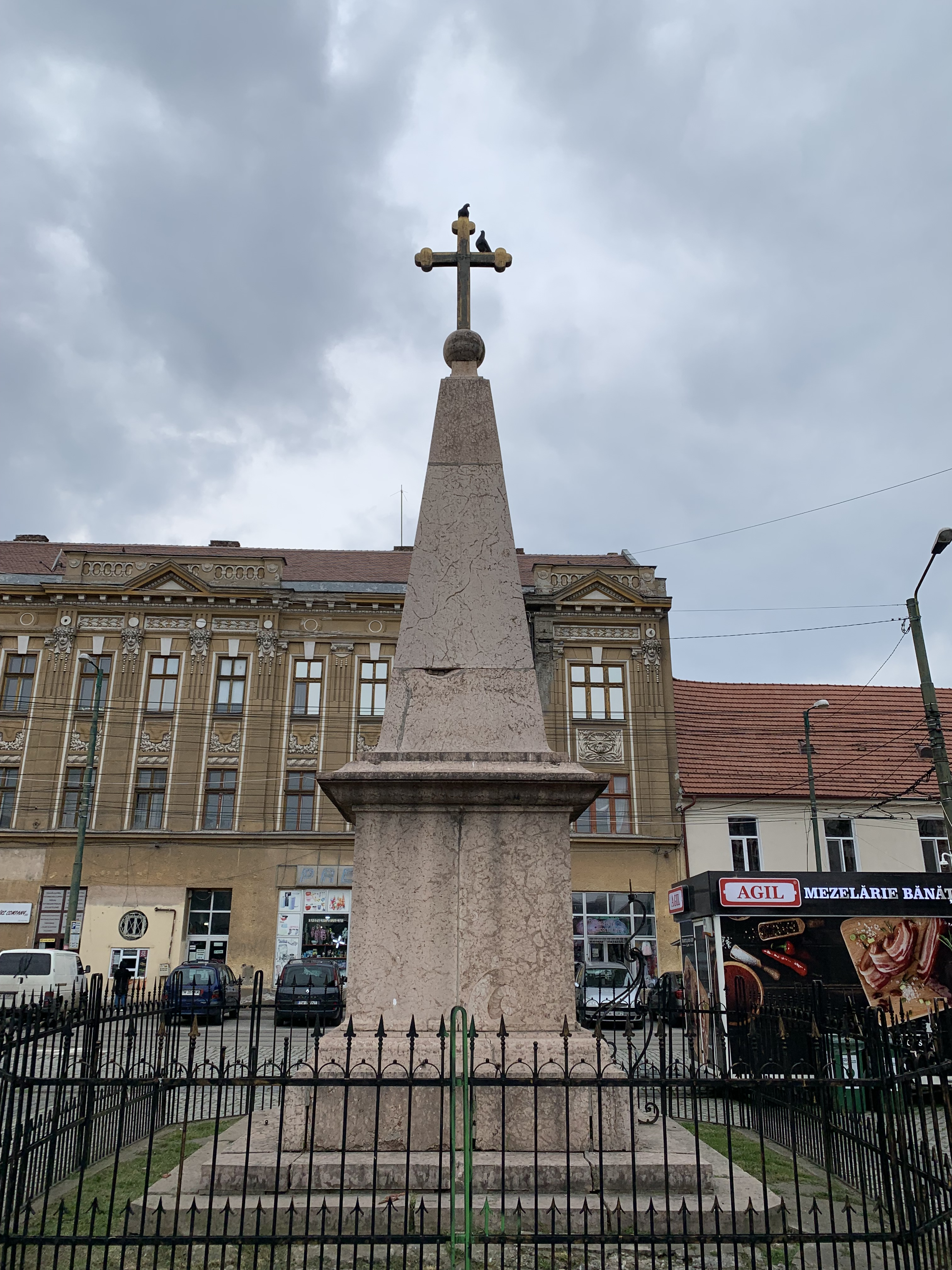
- Location: Trajan Square, Timișoara, Romania
- Coordinates: 45.7578015°N 21.2498723°E
- Type: Obelisk
- Beginning date: 1773
- Completion date: 1774
- Restored date: 1833, 1857, 1893, 1910

The Cross Obelisk (Romanian: Obeliscul cu Cruce) is an obelisk in the Trajan Square of the western Romanian city of Timișoara.

== History ==
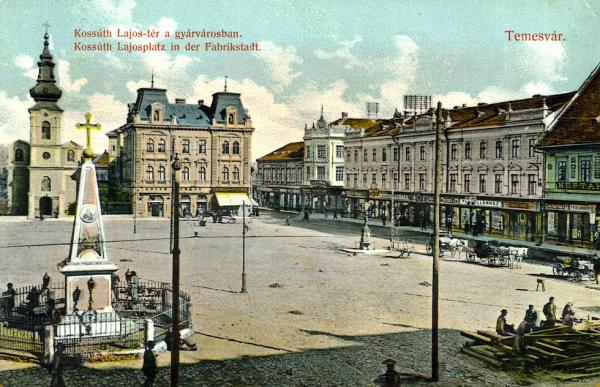
Cross Obelisk in 1900s Lajos Kossuth Square (today Trajan Square)

The obelisk was built in 1774, as inscribed on the monument. However, a monument had already existed on the site, shown in plans from 1760, and is believed to have been the first Romanian Orthodox church in Fabric. The erection of the Cross Obelisk located opposite the church began in 1773, under the care of the Rascian magistrate Stojša Spasojević and his wife and was financed by the Orthodox believers in the parish.

The monument was once the centerpiece of the Epiphany celebration. Each year, on 6 January and on the feast day of Saint George, the church's patron saint, the square would come alive with both priests and laypeople. Romanian and Serbian Orthodox believers would gather in processions, walking in front of the cross as they prayed. On the obelisk's large marble base, there is an inscription in Serbian, and on the side facing the church, an ammonite with a diameter of nearly half a meter is visible. The monument underwent several restorations in 1833, 1857, 1893, and 1910.
