= Hodoș wooden church =

Heritage site in Timiș County, Romania

St. Demeter Church
- Biserica „Sf. Dimitrie”
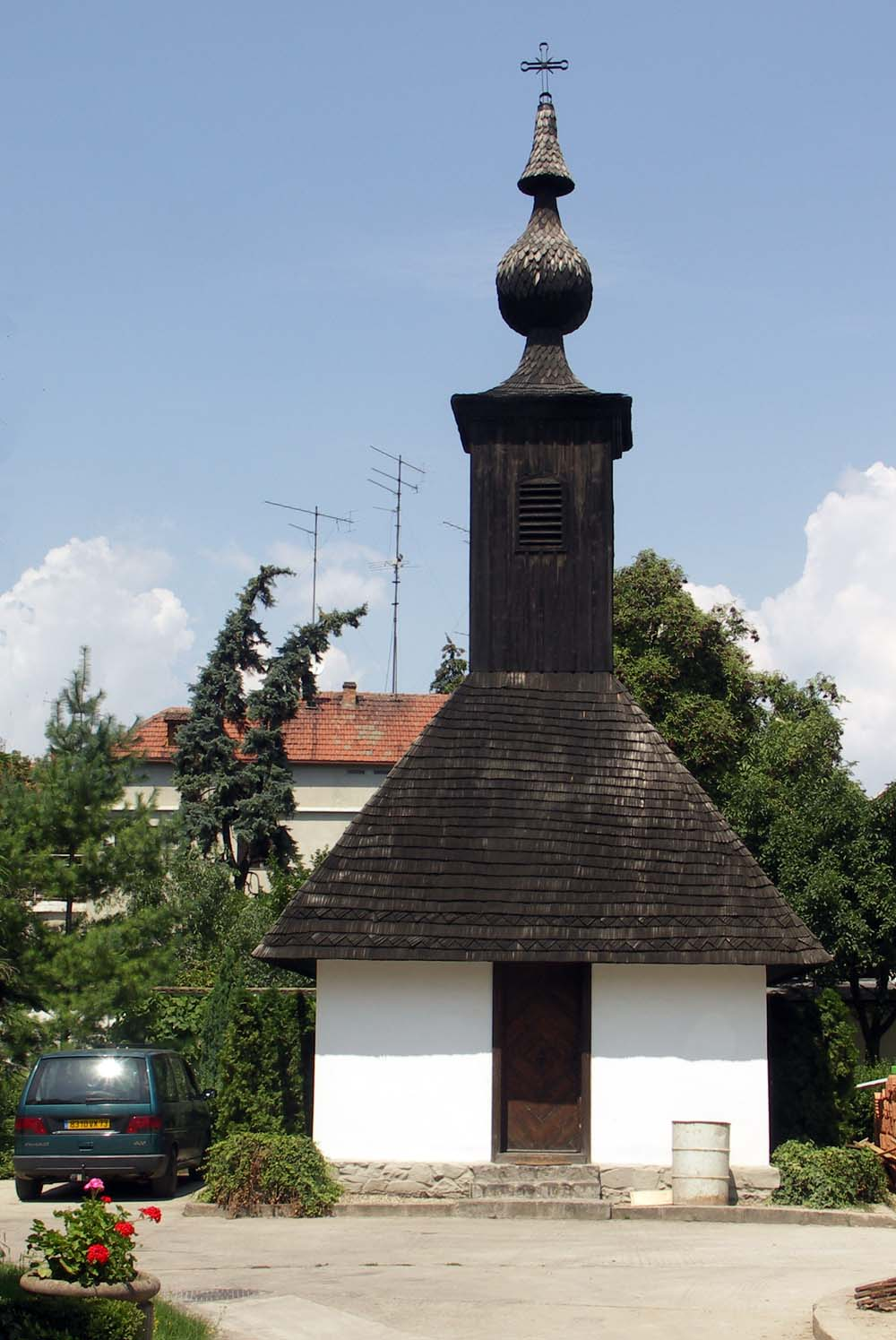
- West side

Religion
- Affiliation: Romanian Orthodox
- Patron: Saint Demeter
- Status: Active

Location
- Location: Orthodox Diocesan Center, Timișoara, Romania
- Interactive map of St. Demeter Church
- Coordinates: 45°45′3″N 21°13′46″E

Architecture
- Completed: 1774
- Materials: Oak

Hodoș wooden church, dedicated to Saint Demeter, originates from the village of the same name in Timiș County, Romania, and dates back to 1774. The church was moved in 1970 to the yard of the Orthodox Diocesan Center in Timișoara. It is included in the list of historical monuments with the code TM-II-m-B-06145.

== History ==
Built in the village of Hodoș, Timiș County, the church probably dates back to the second half of the 18th century. Local tradition preserves the hypothesis that, with the systematization that took place at the beginning of the 19th century, the church would have been moved to the new hearth of the village.

In 1923, the church was restored, at which time the oak walls were plastered with earth and the painting was destroyed by whitewashing. There is also the hypothesis that the church would never have been painted.

Being in an advanced state of disrepair, the church was brought to its new location in the early 1970s, at which time extensive restoration work was undertaken. Instead of painting, the walls and iconostasis of the church are decorated with old icons, on glass and wood, collected from churches in the region.

In 2011, since there was already a community of monks at the metropolitan residence, the hermitage of monks dedicated to Saint Nicholas was established.

== Architecture ==
The church is built of oak wood, glued on the outside with earth, and the apse of the altar is semicircular. The roof frame is also made of oak, carved from bard, and the covering made of shingles. The prismatic tower that rises above the narthex is clad with fir planks, the baroque-style bulb above, as well as a short conical spire that covers it, are clad with shingles. It is the only wooden church in Banat where the western extremity of the vault of the nave does not end with a tympanum, but with a prominent curved recess, so that the entire vault creates the impression of a large flattened dome.

== Gallery ==
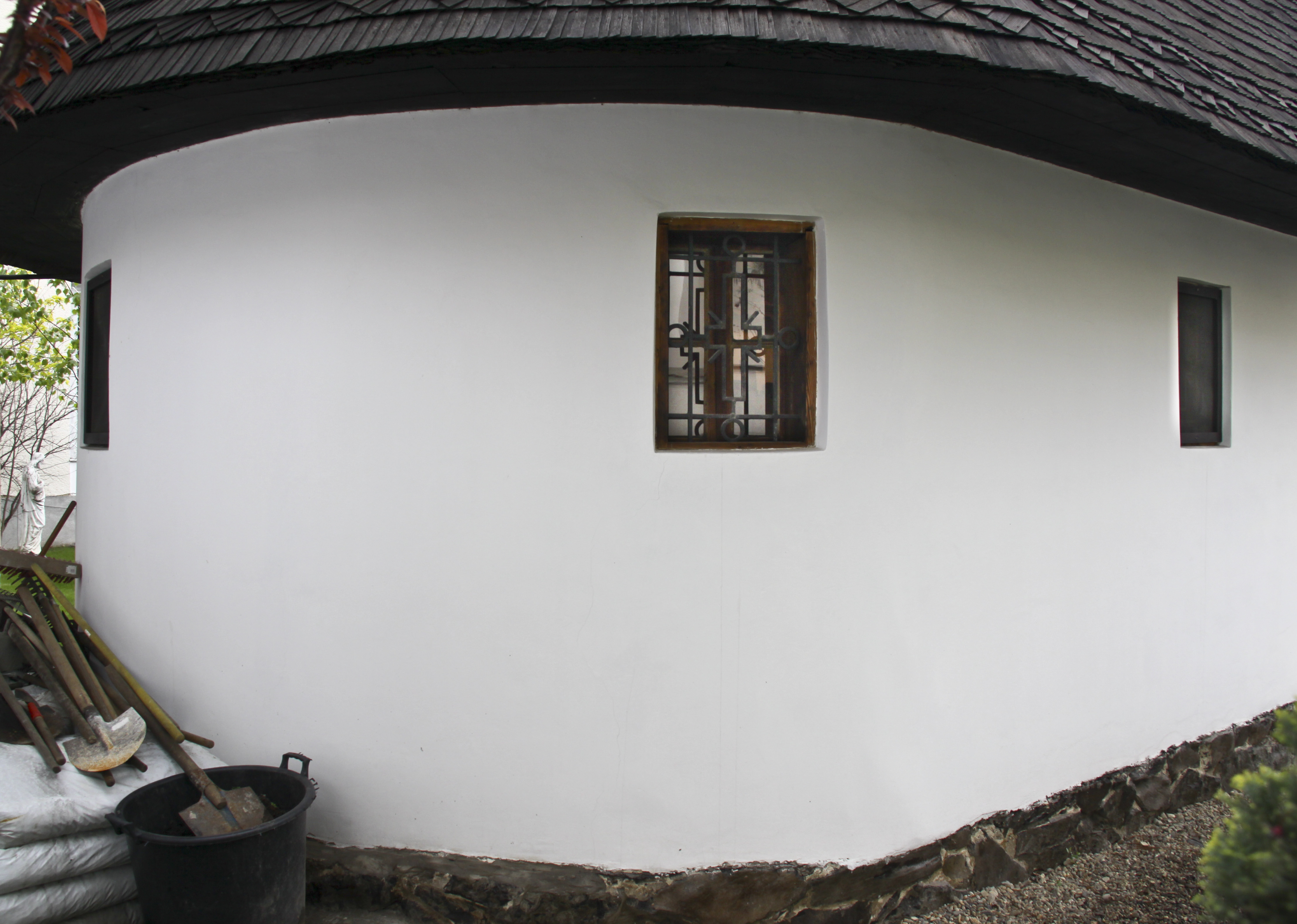
The semicircular altar

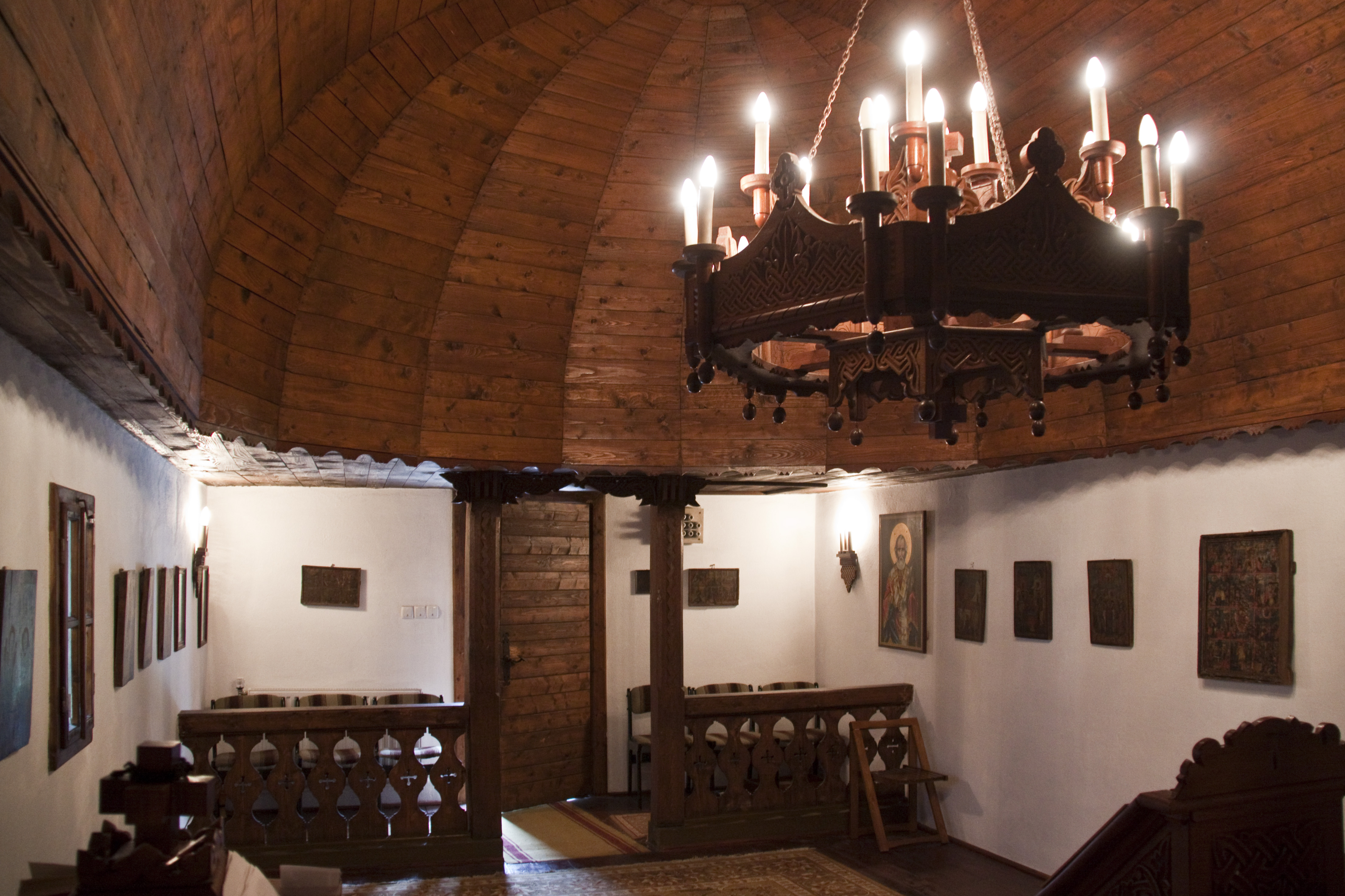
The nave

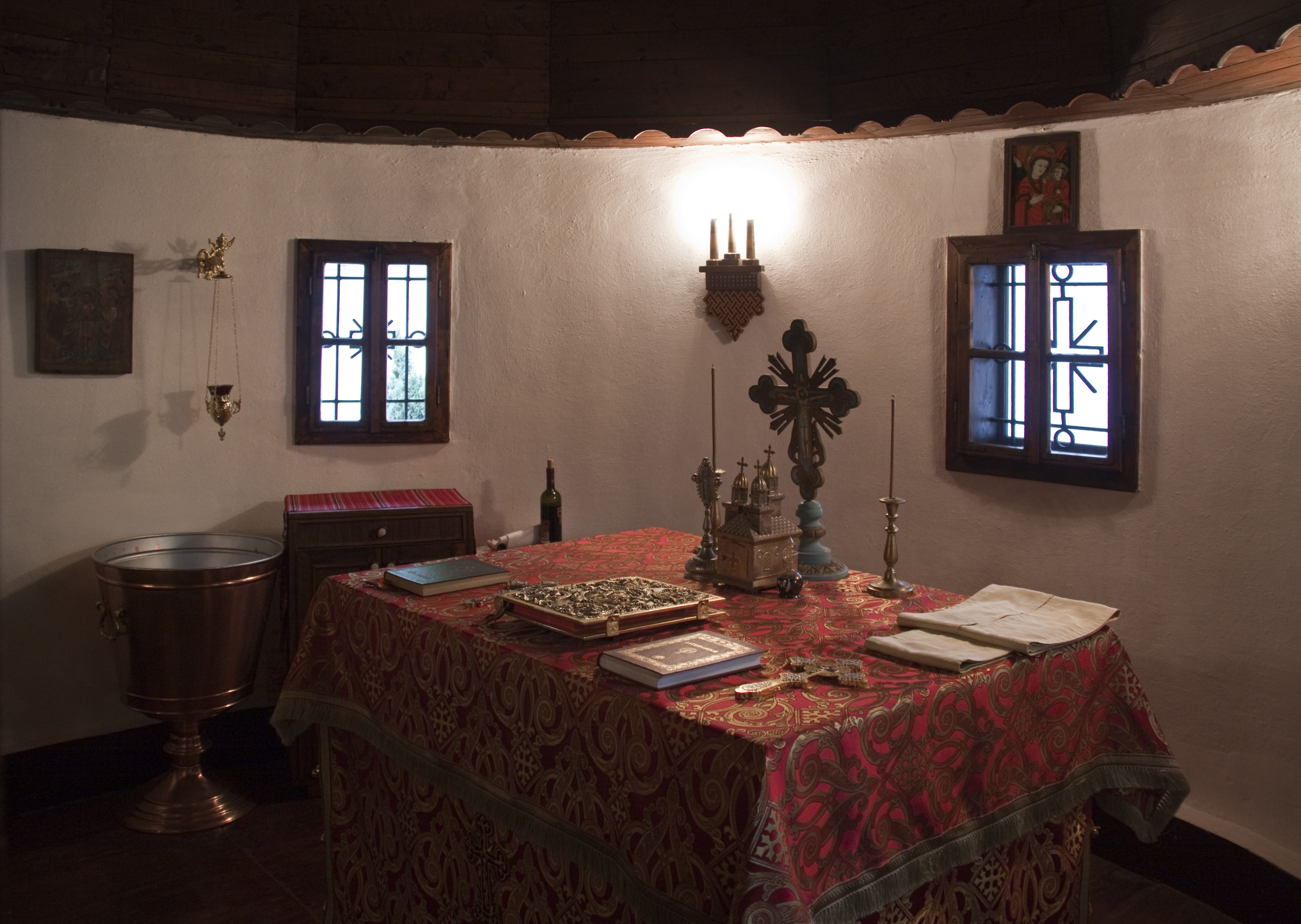
The altar
