= Church Square, Timișoara =

Square in Timișoara, Romania

Church Square Piața Bisericii
- City square
- Former name: Templom tér • Eforie Square
- Length: 243.82 m
- Dedicated to: Elisabetin Orthodox Church
- Location: Elisabetin, Timișoara
- Interactive map of Church Square
- Coordinates: 45°44′33″N 21°13′46″E

The Church Square (Romanian: Piața Bisericii) is a public square in the Elisabetin district of Timișoara, Romania. It is so named after the Orthodox church here, built in the second half of the 18th century.

== History ==
Church Square, as it is known today, took shape in the early 20th century through the systematization of large plots of land and gardens located along the eastern boundary of the Esplanade, adjacent to what would become Nicolae Bălcescu Square (Grundhausplatz/Telekház tér). The expansion of housing toward the fortress—made possible after construction restrictions were lifted in 1892—along with the integration of the Romanian section of the Maierele Vechi suburb into the newly formed Elisabetin neighborhood in 1896, combined with local soil and topographical conditions, led to overlapping urban patterns. These overlapping configurations resulted in abandoned or undeveloped spaces, which were later transformed into public squares, similar to Cross Square and Vasile Adamachi Square in Elisabetin.

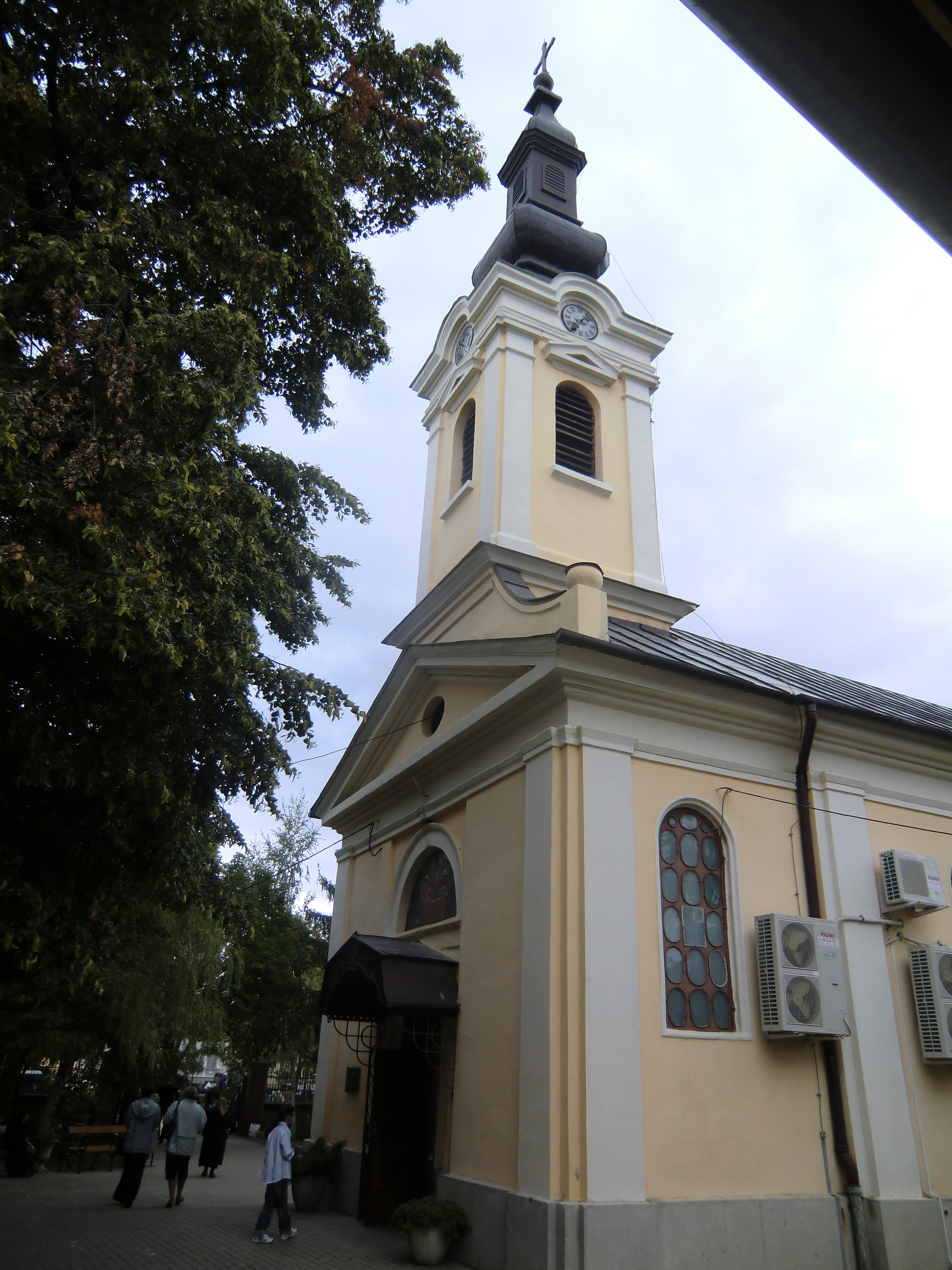
The Orthodox church in Elisabetin

Church Square is named after the Orthodox church built in 1784 (which, by the early 20th century, appeared as Greek Catholic), and the designation Templom tér is recorded on maps from 1901 to 1902. The square's form developed gradually at the junction of two distinct rural fabrics: one extending from the south, characterized by dense, small plots (Maierele Române), and another stretching from Nicolae Bălcescu Square, marked by larger plots with houses and expansive gardens (Maierele Germane). The central role of the Orthodox presence in the Elisabetin neighborhood is emphasized by the spatial relationship between the church (Templom), Church Square (Templom tér), and Church Street (Templom utca), all converging toward Nicolae Bălcescu Square.

The 1913 map shows Church Square as having a rectangular, landscaped, and green design, in contrast to Cross Square and King Square (now Vasile Adamachi), which are depicted as paved, mineral spaces. One possible explanation for this layout is the completion of the surrounding residential block and the desire to emphasize the significance of the Orthodox church within the neighborhood. The church itself had been expanded and renovated in 1893–1894 through donations from local residents, an event that, according to Josef Geml, was marked by "a joyful prayer attended by the entire city." Alternatively, the landscaped character of the square may have been influenced by its proximity to the productive estates of renowned gardeners Wilhelm Mühle and Franz Niemetz. This could suggest an early 20th-century landscape vision for the square, perhaps inspired by a participatory model similar to that seen in the creation of today's Carmen Sylva Park.

Historical images show that the square's original design followed the principles of geometric landscaping, featuring a central paved area into which diagonal pathways converged—emphasizing its role as a transit space—framed by rows of deciduous and coniferous trees along the perimeter. Compositional changes occurred during the interwar period, from which a number of long-lived trees still survive today, including American maple (Acer negundo) and horse chestnut (Aesculus hippocastanum), likely planted around 1930.

After 1989, the green space underwent several minor "modernizations," with the most significant intervention taking place in 2008. This redesign had a visible impact: classical elements were introduced, such as an artesian fountain reinforcing the central axis, a metal pergola, rose beds, and urban furniture—all contributing to a romanticized atmosphere, while also incorporating a playground function. On the botanical level, species aligned with a "Mediterranean garden" aesthetic were introduced, including Judas tree (Cercis siliquastrum), Indian lilac (Lagerstroemia indica), and pomegranate (Punica sp.), species that appear somewhat disconnected from the local cultural landscape and biodiversity.

Among recent developments was a proposal to construct a large, high-rise apartment building on the site of the former Oglinda factory in Church Square. The project faced opposition from the Timișoara Society, a member of the Civic Committee for the Safeguarding of Timișoara's Heritage, and was ultimately rejected by the Local Council. In parallel, recent landscape interventions—particularly the dense vegetation planted along the southern edge—have visually distanced the square from the church. Nevertheless, the square continues to play a role in Orthodox religious life, serving as a communal space for Christian residents during the Resurrection service.
