= Cross Square, Timișoara =

Cross Square Piața Crucii
- City square
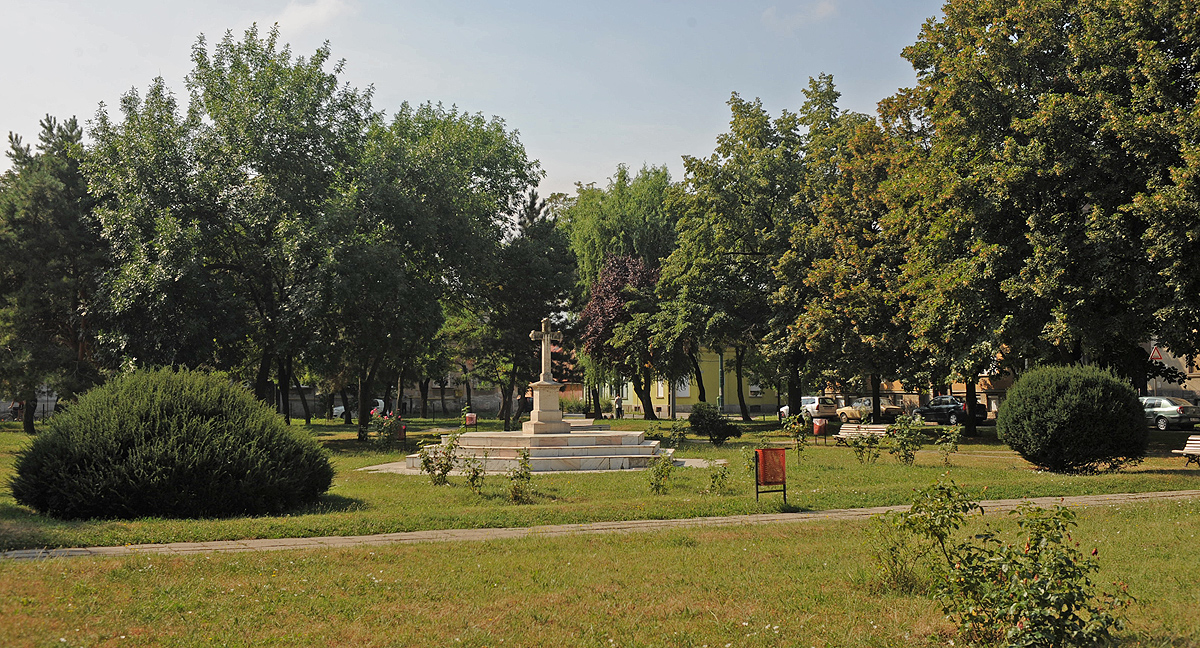
- Length: 360.83 m
- Location: Elisabetin, Timișoara
- Interactive map of Cross Square
- Coordinates: 45°44′31″N 21°13′53″E

The Cross Square (Romanian: Piața Crucii; Hungarian: Kereszt tér; German: Kreuzplatz) is a square-park in the Elisabetin district of the western Romanian city of Timișoara. The square is closely associated with the urban development of the area in the late 19th and early 20th centuries. Initially made up of gardens and undeveloped land, the area was organized following the lifting of building restrictions (1892) and the territorial expansion of the Elisabetin district (1896).

The space stands as one of the few urban "green hearts" within the Elisabetin district, providing a place of refuge and enhancing the character of the neighborhood, which is defined by early 20th-century modern architecture, paved streets, and a serene urban tradition.

== Name ==
The square derives its name from an old stone cross situated at its center. This cross was erected after the relocation of the Orthodox church from Maiere, which had originally stood on this site in the 18th century and had been rebuilt multiple times. When the church was moved to Eforie Square (now known as Church Square), the altar remained at the original location. To mark the spot, the stone cross was installed, eventually leading to the name Cross Square.
