= Mühle House =

- Casa Mühle
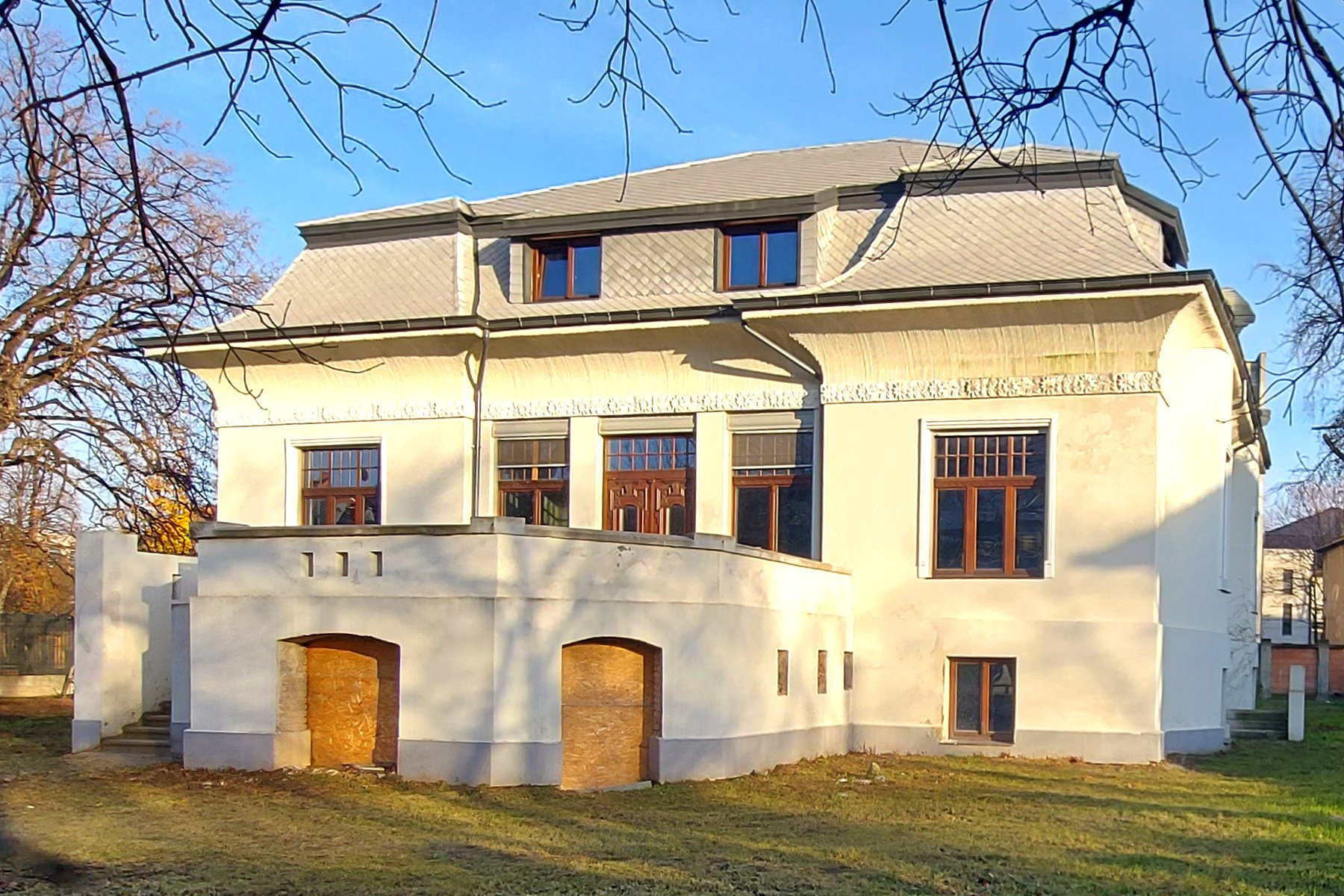
- Mühle House in 2025
- Interactive map of the Mühle House area
- Alternative names: Mühle Villa

General information
- Location: Timișoara, Romania
- Coordinates: 45°44′39″N 21°13′34″E
- Completed: 1909
- Renovated: 2023

Design and construction
- Architect: Oskar Reinhart
- Main contractor: Josef Hofgärtner

The Mühle House (Romanian: Casa Mühle) is a historical villa in the Elisabetin district of Timișoara, Romania. The house belonged to the famous family of florists Mühle. It is part of Michael the Brave Boulevard urban ensemble, listed as a historical monument with LMI code TM-II-a-B-06110.

== History ==
By the mid-19th century, there was another house approximately on the site of the current building. It was built somewhere between 1866 and 1868 and purchased by Wilhelm (Vilmos) Mühle in 1878. A year after his father's death, in 1909, Árpád will obtain a building permit for a house with a garden, a building that can still be seen today. The Mühle House was designed by the Viennese architect Oskar Reinhart, and the builder was Josef Hofgärtner from Timișoara. Reinhart was related to the famous family of florists from Timișoara, his mother's maiden name being Anna Mühle.

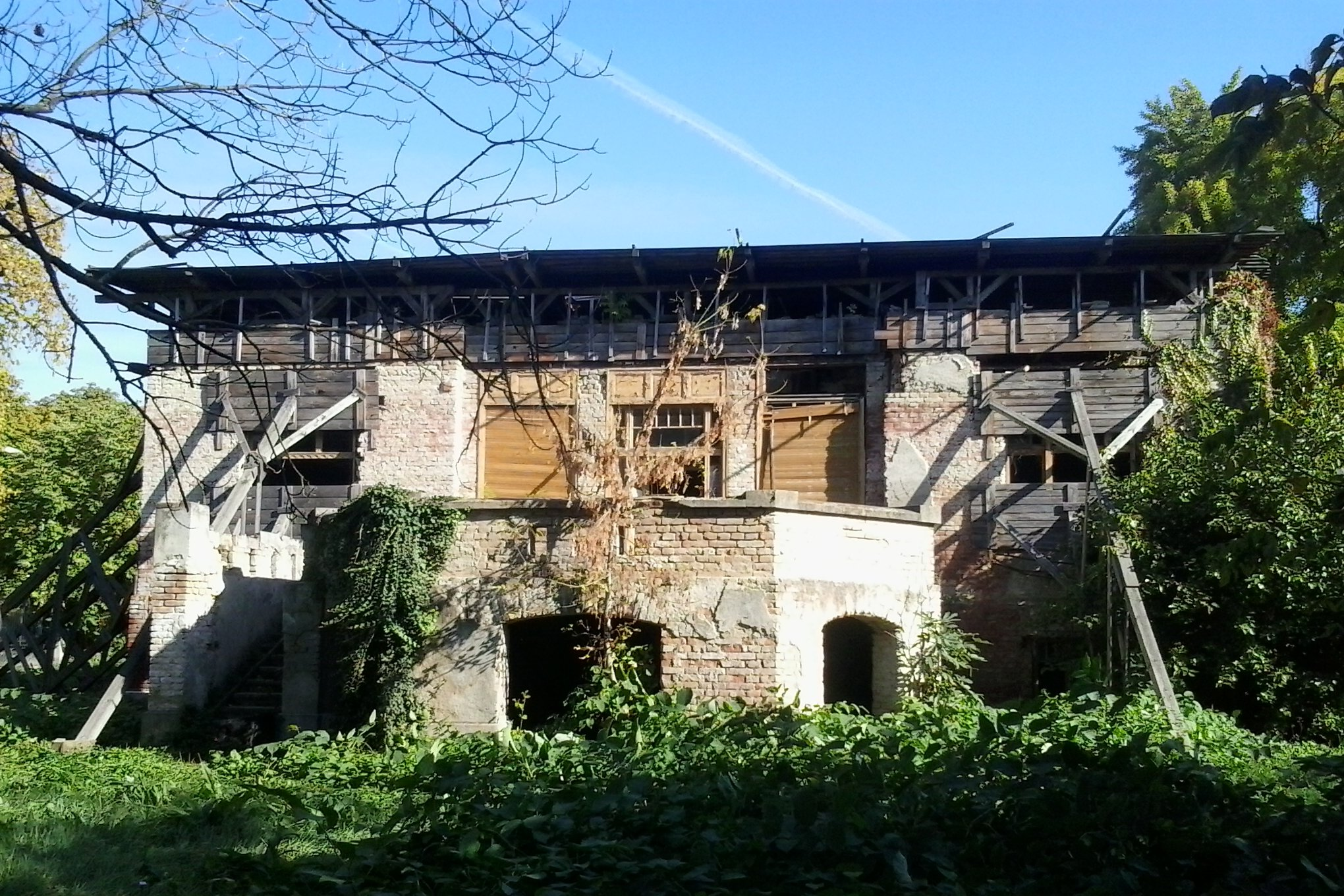
The ruins of Mühle House in 2016

The Mühle family also owned a building in the Cetate district, known to this day as the House with Flowers, due to the fact that it housed the Mühle family's shop of flowers, seeds and floral arrangements, being also the central point where they exhibited and sold their products developed in their greenhouses and nurseries from the Elisabetin district. Mühle had 17 greenhouses and a vast garden in Timișoara, which stretched from the Bega Canal to today's Nicolae Bălcescu Square. On its land are now the West University, the Politehnica University and its stadium with dormitories. After Ernst, Árpád's son, sold part of the horticultural domains, the family business declined.

The last descendant to live there, Wilhelm's great-granddaughter, emigrated to Germany in 1992. Eventually, the house entered the possession of a wealthy Roma family that allowed it to fall into ruins. They intended to demolish the house in 2012. After public protests and pressure from the city hall, a court mandated its restoration in 2016. Work commenced in February 2020 and, despite delays, finished in July 2023. In 2025, the owners put the building on the market for 3.7 million euros, with the city hall holding the right of preemption. Ultimately, however, Politehnica University purchased it for 2.3 million euros to convert it into an educational and cultural center.

== Architecture ==
A house with a mezzanine and a high ground floor, it was an eclectic-style building with neo-baroque influences, punctuated by the shape of the roof and the way the entrance staircase was arranged.
