= Salvatorian Monastery, Timișoara =

Monastery in Elisabetin, Timișoara, Romania

Salvatorian Monastery
- Mănăstirea Salvatorienilor
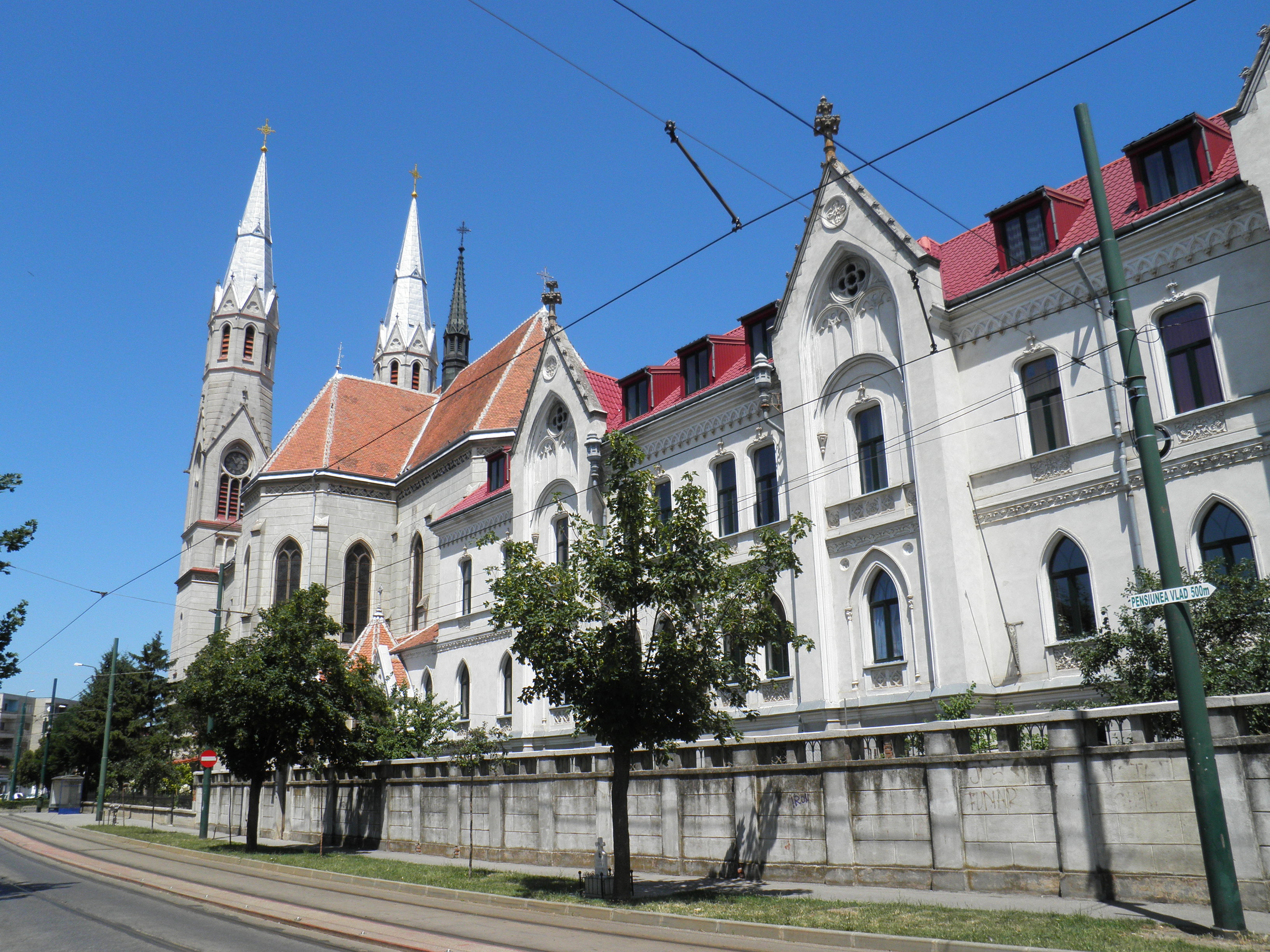

Religion
- Affiliation: Roman Catholic
- Ecclesiastical or organizational status: Monastery
- Status: Active

Location
- Location: 1 1 December 1918 Street, Timișoara, Romania
- Interactive map of Salvatorian Monastery
- Coordinates: 45.7412808°N 21.2261875°E

Architecture
- Architect: Elemér Makkai
- Style: Neo-Gothic
- Completed: 1926

The Salvatorian Monastery is a Roman Catholic monastery belonging to the Society of the Divine Savior. It is located in the Elisabetin district of Timișoara, Romania, behind the Church of the Sacred Heart of Jesus.

== History ==
The Society of the Divine Savior (Societas Divinis Salvatoris, SDS) or in short the Salvatorians have been present in Timișoara since 1895. It was founded in Rome on 8 December 1881 by Johann Baptist Jordan (1848–1918), known as Pater Jordan. In 1895, P. Jordan sent to Timișoara the young Salvatorian priest-monk, just sanctified, P. Fridolin Cichy. He, with the approval of the then diocesan bishop, Alexander Dessewffy, began his activity in Timișoara as a missionary. On 21 November 1898, the Salvatorian Order was called to the country by the bishop of Cenad Julius Glattfelder and entrusted the Salvatorian monks with the pastorate of the believers in the Mehala suburb.

Bishop Dessewffy recommended to P. Jordan in a letter in Latin the construction of a monastery in the Iosefin district or the Elisabetin district. Incidentally, Bishop Dessewffy also donated in the form of a will the sum of 50,000 crowns to that church that will be built in Elisabetin, on the condition that the spiritual pastorate be entrusted to the Salvatorian Order.

The Salvatorian monastery in Timișoara was founded in 1911, and its church was built over about eight years, until 1919. The building of the Salvatorian monastery, next to the church, was erected in 1926. It underwent changes in 1933, including plastic additions and a volumetric increase. The monastery was nationalized in the summer of 1948, being transformed into the headquarters of the Timiș County Consumer Cooperatives and into a vocational school. During this period, the building suffers damage, many pieces of furniture and original details being degraded. The situation will persist until 1993, when the order succeeds in regaining the building, a process followed by a complete renovation.

== Architecture ==
The monastery is in neo-Gothic style, represented by ogival arches, stone lacework and statues attached to the facade. The rhythm of the facade is dictated by strong vertical accents, through four bays in risalit finished in a pointed pediment, connected by horizontal strings of lacework, decorative panels and intermediate braces.

It is worth noting the presence of the germinal typology of the Green Man motif in the decorative panels placed under the windows of the first level. The representation, having a demonic expressiveness (impression amplified by the antagonistic addition in relation to the statue of Jesus), is placed in a vegetal decoration, specific to the motif.
