= Southern Land Casino =

- Délvidéki Kaszinó; Cazinoul Ținutului de Sud
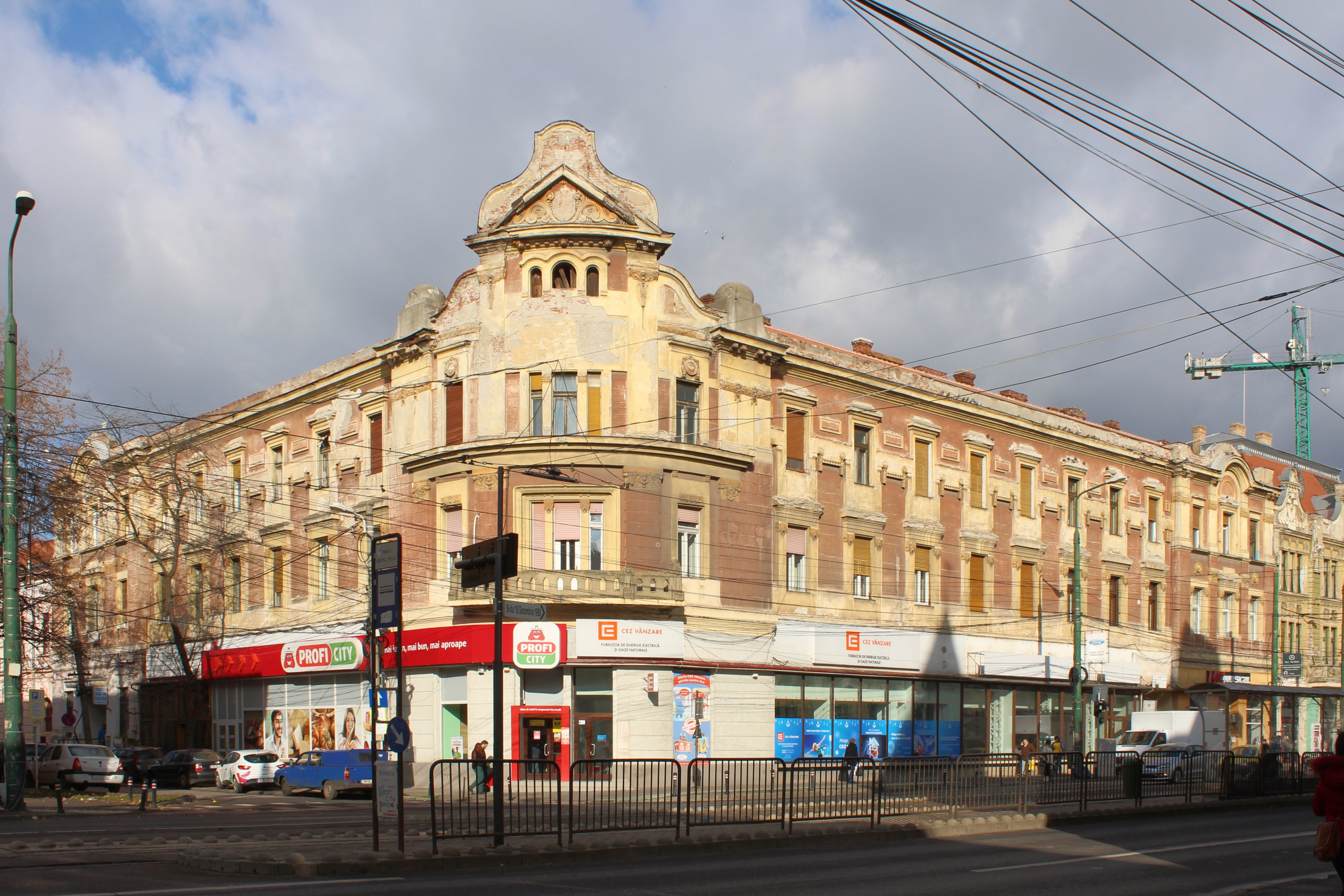
- Interactive map of the Southern Land Casino area

General information
- Architectural style: Secession
- Location: 8 16 December 1989 Boulevard, Timișoara, Romania
- Coordinates: 45°44′54.6″N 21°13′5.88″E
- Construction started: 1902
- Completed: 1905

Design and construction
- Architect: Emil Tőry

The palace of the former Délvidéki Casino (Hungarian for "southland") is located in the historical Iosefin district of Timișoara, Romania, along the current 16 December 1989 Boulevard. The building is incorporated into the urban site of the "Old Iosefin district," a heritage area from the 19th–20th centuries, and is listed under the identification code TM-II-s-B-06098 in the historical monuments registry.

After the 1989 Revolution, the building houses the Timișoara Intercultural Institute, the Lira Hall (Municipal House of Culture), and commercial spaces on the ground floor.

== History ==
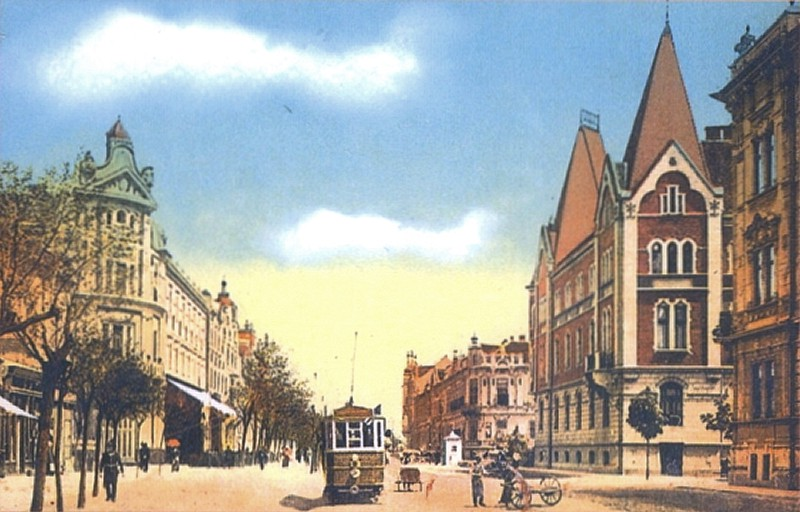
Hunyadi utca (present-day 16 December 1989 Boulevard) with the Délvidéki Casino (left) around 1910

The land it occupies, situated between the former heart of the district and the Bega Canal, became available for development following the decision to dismantle the Timișoara Fortress in 1892. In 1900, two plots were acquired for the construction of the Southland Casino Palace—one on 16 December 1989 Boulevard/St. Mary Square (Hunyadi utca) and another on Miron Costin Street (Horvát Boldizsár utca)—for a total cost of 14,575 crowns. Designed by Budapest architect Emil Tőry, the palace was built based on a series of building permits issued between 1902 and 1904. It was inaugurated on 15 January 1905, with the Iosefin-Elisabetin Social Club as the first beneficiary. From 1897 until its opening, the club operated in the Palace of the City Pension Fund in Küttl Square (now Alexandru Mocioni Square).

The ground floor and much of the first floor once housed a casino, officially named Délvidéki Kaszinó, which introduced the "five o'clock" tradition to Timișoara for the first time, following the British custom. This was inspired by Count István Széchenyi, who established a casino in Budapest in 1827. The casino's success led to it becoming a model for other clubs across Hungary. Inside, the casino featured gaming tables, spaces for literary meetings, a library, and a ballroom. Before the empire's transition, the Modern Variety Theatre performed there every season. During the interwar period (1913–1948), Nikolaus Trasser's White House fashion house operated in the building, with a large clothing store on the ground floor. After World War II, parts of the public areas were taken over by the Municipal House of Culture, and the casino ballroom was converted into Lira Hall, which continues to serve as a multifunctional cultural space. A summer theater was established in the courtyard at the beginning of the 20th century and later became the Forum cinema, which operated until the mid-20th century. During the socialist period, the ground floor facade was significantly altered when Rapid, the city's first self-service store, operated in the commercial space. The facade, originally with rhythmic equidistant gaps, was transformed into a continuous display window, requiring modifications to both the ground floor's structure and the interior.

== Architecture ==
The building's architecture is striking, featuring a rectangular layout and distinctive Secessionist elements like floral motifs and geometric designs. A triangular pediment crowns the main entrance, while a tower with a balcony marks the corner of the structure.

The exterior facades feature two distinct sections: the ground floor and the upper floors. The corner of the facade is rounded and set back from the main plane, providing direct access from the street. This entrance aligns with the compositional axis of the corner area and is sheltered by the underside of a modern, curvaceous balcony. The recessed corner serves as a counterpart to the end sections of the facades, which are treated with a raised relief and organized in an axial composition. The upper corner of the building is defined by a pediment with a complex, undulating design, which incorporates a classic pediment and a cartouche for the coat of arms. Originally, the top of the pediment was adorned with a crowning element that supported an arrow, while two female figures bordered the highest step of the pediment. The ends of the corner relief were marked by female figures integrated into decorative cartouches positioned above the cornice. Unfortunately, these intricate details have been irreparably lost over time due to a lack of facade maintenance.

From an aesthetic perspective, the facade decorations draw inspiration from historical models and natural plant motifs, reinterpreted through a distinct process of stylization and geometric abstraction. The integrated capitals and ornamental bands of the projections feature mascarons, along with anthropomorphic or zoomorphic elements. The upper register’s bossages are adorned with combed plaster, marked by vertical grooves, while the spaces between the decorated sections are treated similarly but with wavy decorative grooves.
