= Marschall Palace =

- Palatul Marschall
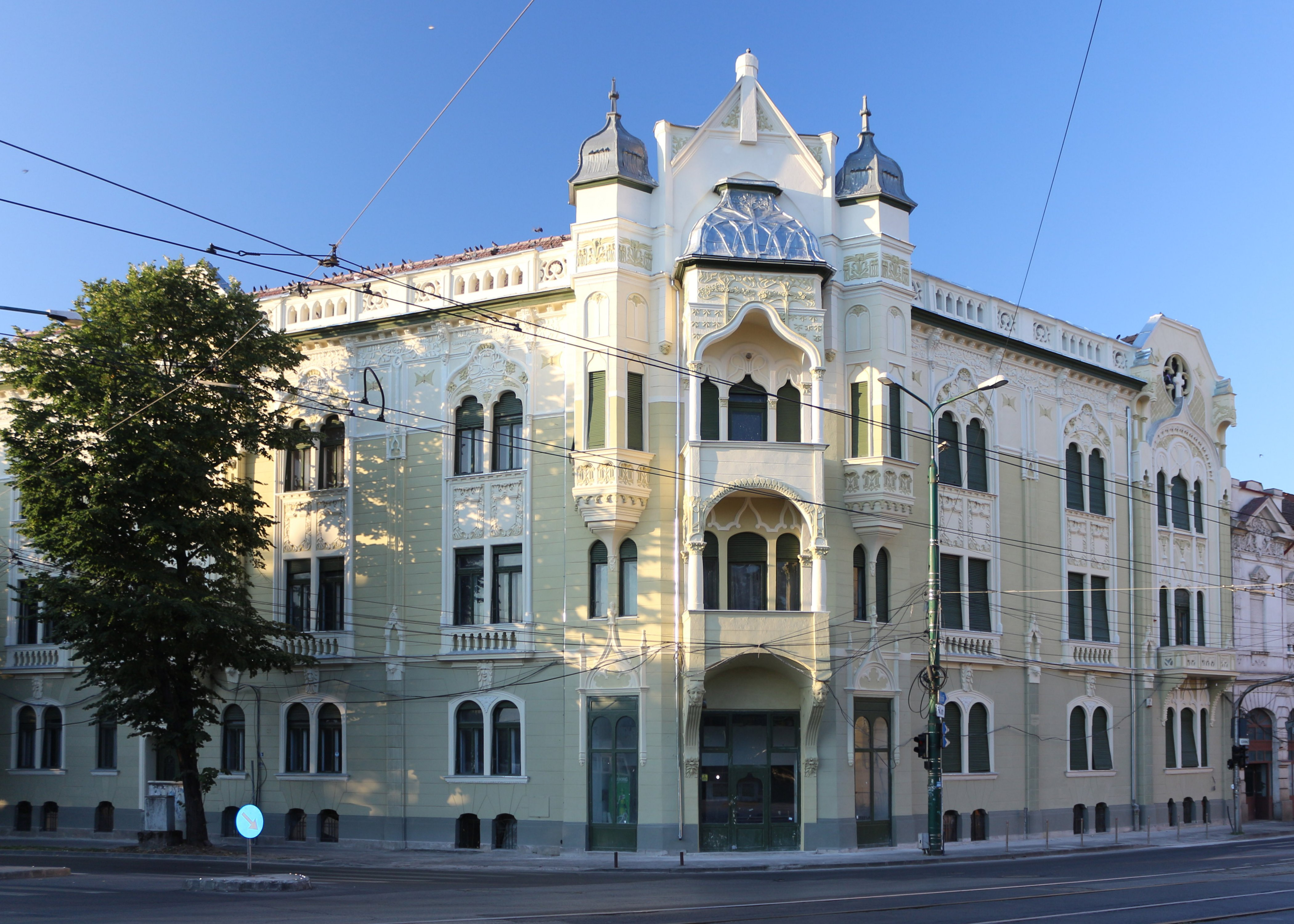
- Interactive map of the Marschall Palace area
- Alternative names: Palace with Butterflies

General information
- Architectural style: Art Nouveau
- Location: 12 Tudor Vladimirescu Embankment; Timișoara; Romania
- Coordinates: 45°44′56″N 21°13′12″E
- Construction started: 1903
- Completed: 1904
- Renovated: 2024

Design and construction
- Architect: Martin Gemeinhardt

The Marschall Palace, nicknamed the Palace with Butterflies by locals, is a historical monument building in Timișoara, Romania, located at the entrance from the city center to the Elisabetin district, opposite the Water Palace.

== History ==
Before 1892, the land on which the Marschall Palace is currently located was part of the Non ædificandi zone of 300 fathoms (569 m), whose limit was next to the current Gheorghe Doja Street. Following the 1891 measures taken by the city, carried out by the mayor Carol Telbisz, Franz Joseph, by the decision of 23 April 1892, raised the fortification character of Timișoara, as a result it was possible to build closer to the fortress.

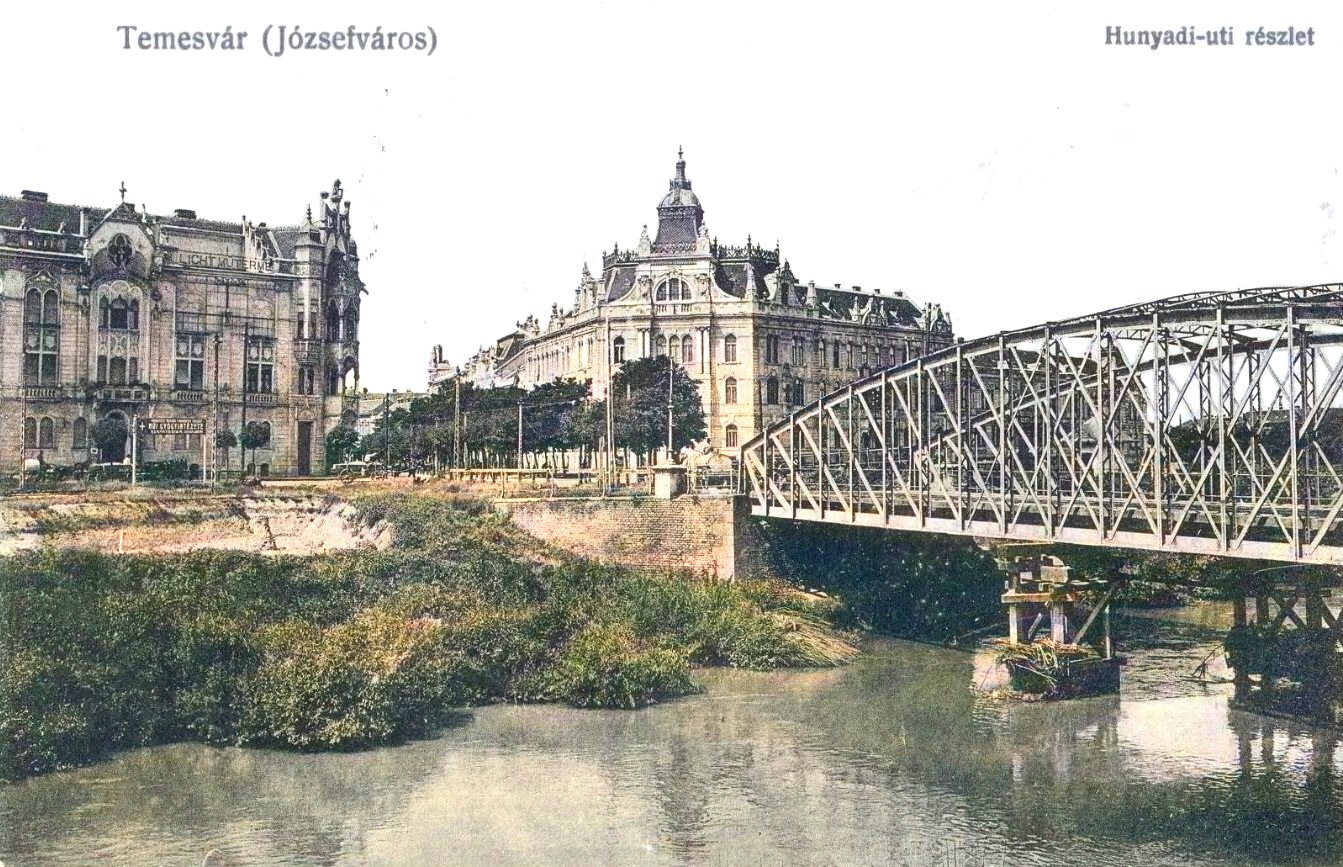
Pre-1910 postcard with Marschall Palace on the left

In 1899, the area between Gheorghe Doja Street and the Bega Canal was parceled out. Róna Ignácz bought two lots, of which the one on the corner, with an area of 345 square fathoms (1241 m^{2}) cost 6,760 crowns (equivalent to 2.06 kg of gold). He later sold this lot to Franz Marschall, a wealthy merchant, who was in 1938 the minister of Agriculture in Hungary. Marschall turned to Martin Gemeinhardt for the design of a two-story resort palace. The building permit was issued on 14 December 1903 and construction was completed on 1 November 1904.

In 1925, the Pittoni photography workshop of the photographer Lenke Pittoni operated on the ground floor.

Between 2017 and 2024, its facades were rehabilitated. In 2025, it was put up for sale for 3.3 million euros, with the city hall declining to purchase it given other priorities regarding the city's heritage.

== Architecture ==
The style of the building is eclectic Art Nouveau, the neo-Gothic elements reinterpreted in the 1900s style being richly represented by stylized butterflies, floral elements, the "tree of life" and decorations in the form of Gothic ribs that mark the median axis of the two facades from the street.

The palace has a small central bay facing north and two wings. The one on the east, of c. 29 m, which also includes the entrance, is located on Tudor Vladimirescu Embankment, and the one on the west, of c. 18 m, is located on 16 December 1989 Boulevard, towards St. Mary Square. The building has a ground floor, two floors and a mezzanine on almost the entire built surface. The built area is 744 m^{2}, and the useful area is 2958 m^{2}. The palace has nine apartments, 54 rooms and 11 bathrooms.

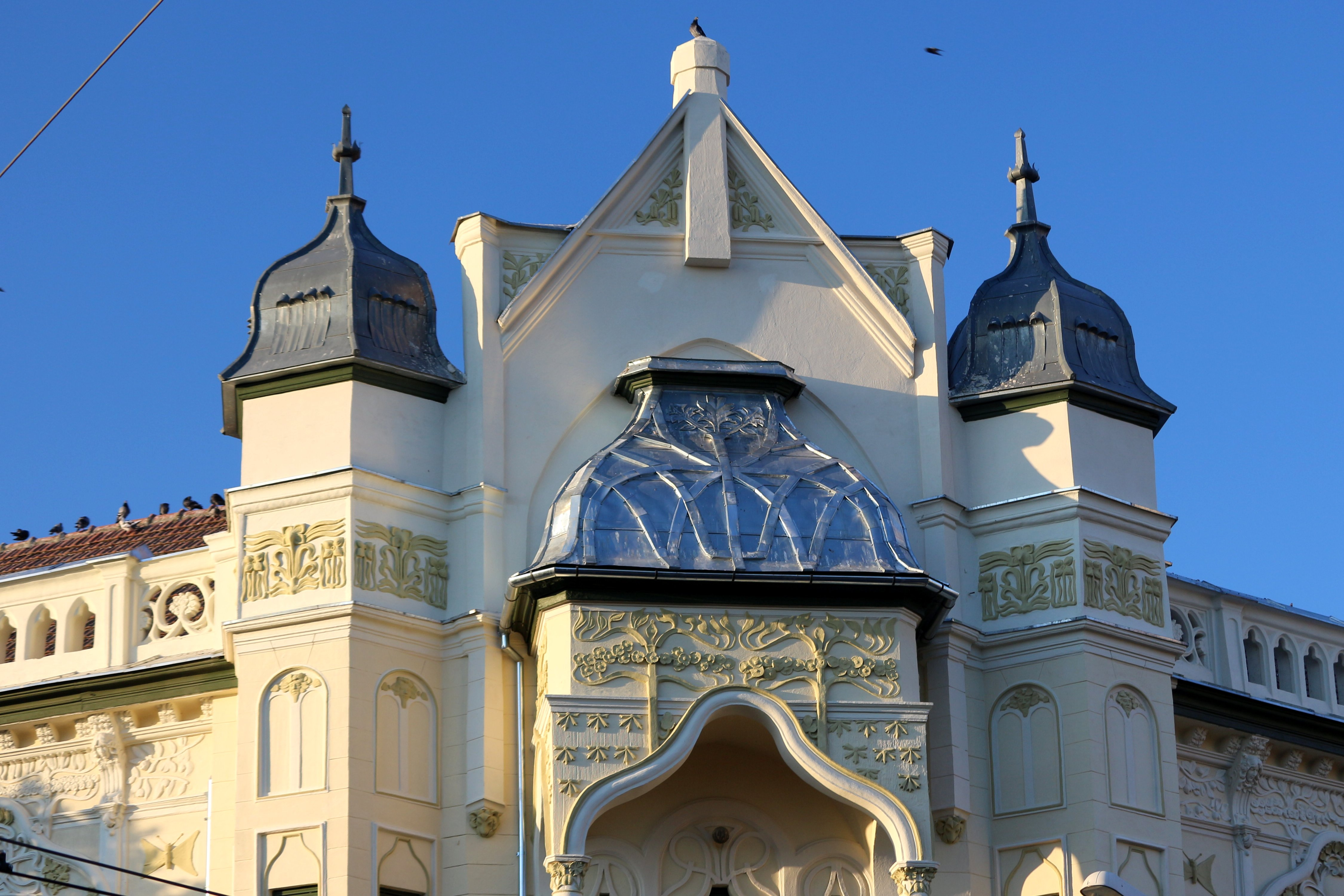
The "tree of life" on the roof of the middle facade

On the ground floor, in the central bay, there is a commercial space with an area of c. 30 m^{2}, located at the level of the sidewalk and with direct access from the sidewalk. Inside, there is a mezzanine in the basement with an area of c. 16 m^{2}, intended for storage. This space does not communicate with the rest of the palace. In the rest of the ground floor there are three apartments, each with separate bathrooms, two in the east wing and one in the west wing.

The first and second floors have identical arrangements. Here too, three apartments are set up, two in the east wing and one in the west wing. The rooms in the central bay, located above the commercial space, with access to the balconies, are part of the apartments in the west wing. The balcony on the first floor is supported by consoles decorated with female figures and plant motifs. It has rounded pilasters and columns supporting the second floor balcony and is decorated with floral motifs. The second floor balcony has simple pilasters and columns. Above it and on its roof is the stylized "tree of life". The balcony is framed by two bay windows that continue with towers. Both above the balconies and on each facade there is a pediment. The entire building is decorated with female figures and animal and plant motifs: butterflies, rams, fish, grapes and flowers.
