= Elisabetin Reformed Church =

Church in St. Mary Square, Timișoara, Romania

- Biserica Reformată din Elisabetin (Romanian); Erzsébetvárosi református templom (Hungarian)
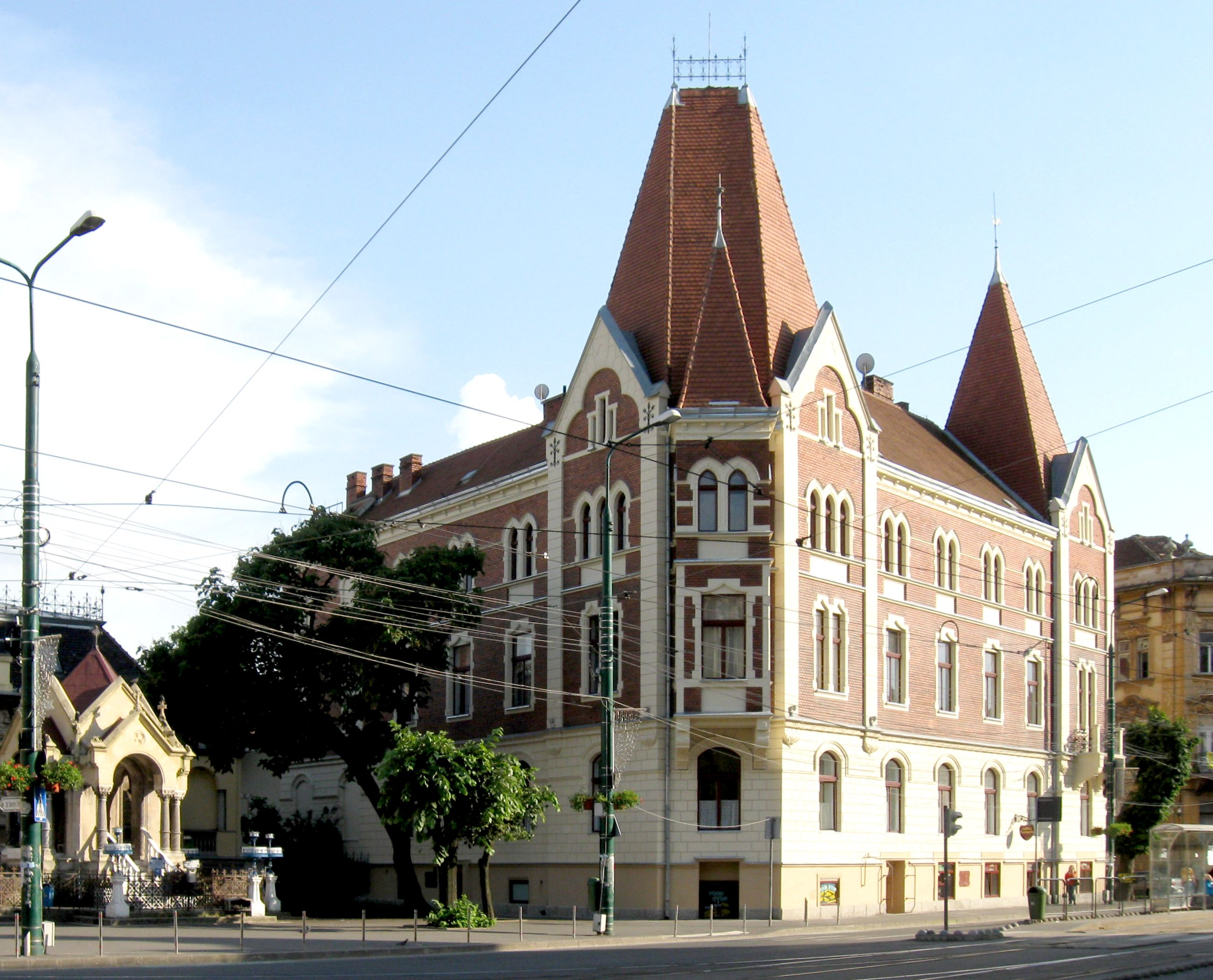

Religion
- Affiliation: Reformed
- Ecclesiastical or organisational status: Reformed Church in Romania
- Year consecrated: 1902
- Status: Active

Location
- Location: St. Mary Square, Timișoara
- Interactive map of Elisabetin Reformed Church
- Coordinates: 45°44′53″N 21°13′6″E

Architecture
- Architects: György Nagy, Jr., László Jánosházy
- Style: Anglo-Gothic
- General contractor: Karl Hart
- Groundbreaking: 1901
- Completed: 1902
- Capacity: 500

Elisabetin Reformed Church (Romanian: Biserica Reformată din Elisabetin; Hungarian: Erzsébetvárosi református templom) is a Hungarian Reformed church in the Elisabetin district of Timișoara.

== History ==
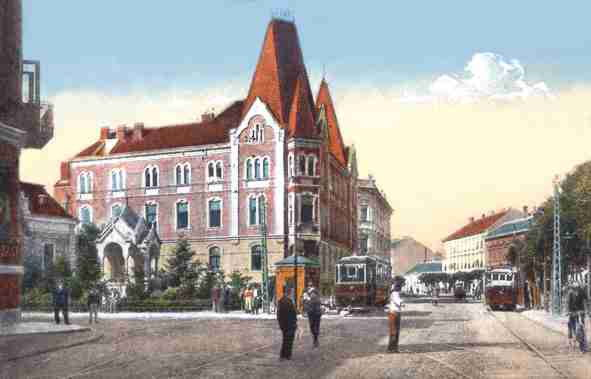
The Reformed Church in 1910

In 1898, the Reformed Church bought two lots from the Timișoara City Hall, part of the new squares that appeared with the lifting of the construction ban in the Non ædificandi area (esplanade). The two neighboring lots, located at the end of Hunyadi Boulevard (present-day 16 December 1989 Boulevard), belonging to Batthyány Street (present-day Timotei Cipariu Street), were also bought for 2,940 Kronen, and on 26 July 1901, building permits would be issued for a church and a two-story report palace. The church project was designed by architects György Nagy, Jr. and László Jánosházy from Budapest, architects and professors of the Budapest Polytechnic, and the execution was entrusted to the Timișoara builder Karl Hart, under the guidance of Pastor Mihály Szabolcska. The construction work began on 1 August 1901 and was completed on 28 June 1902. The building was festively inaugurated on 19 October 1902.

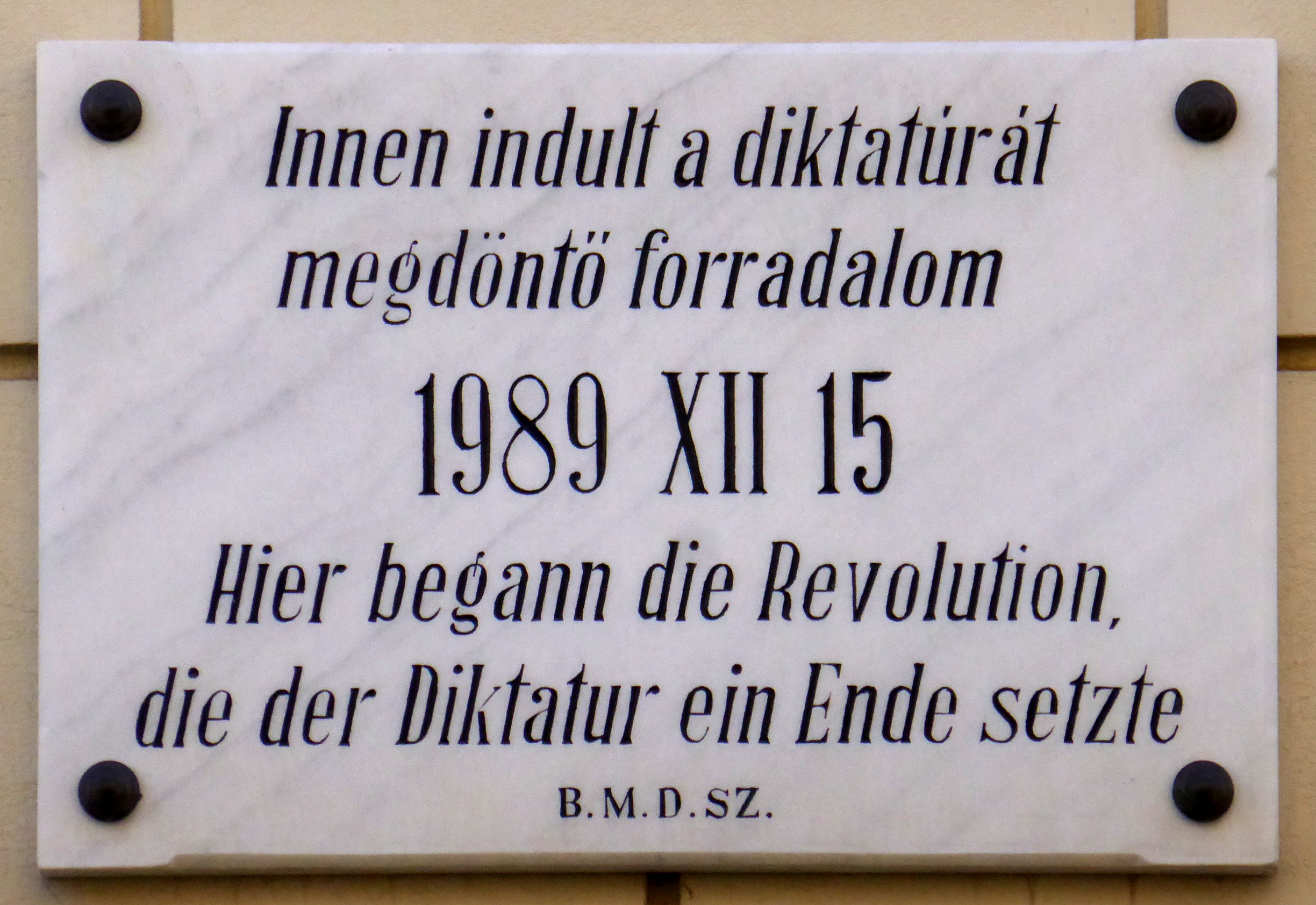
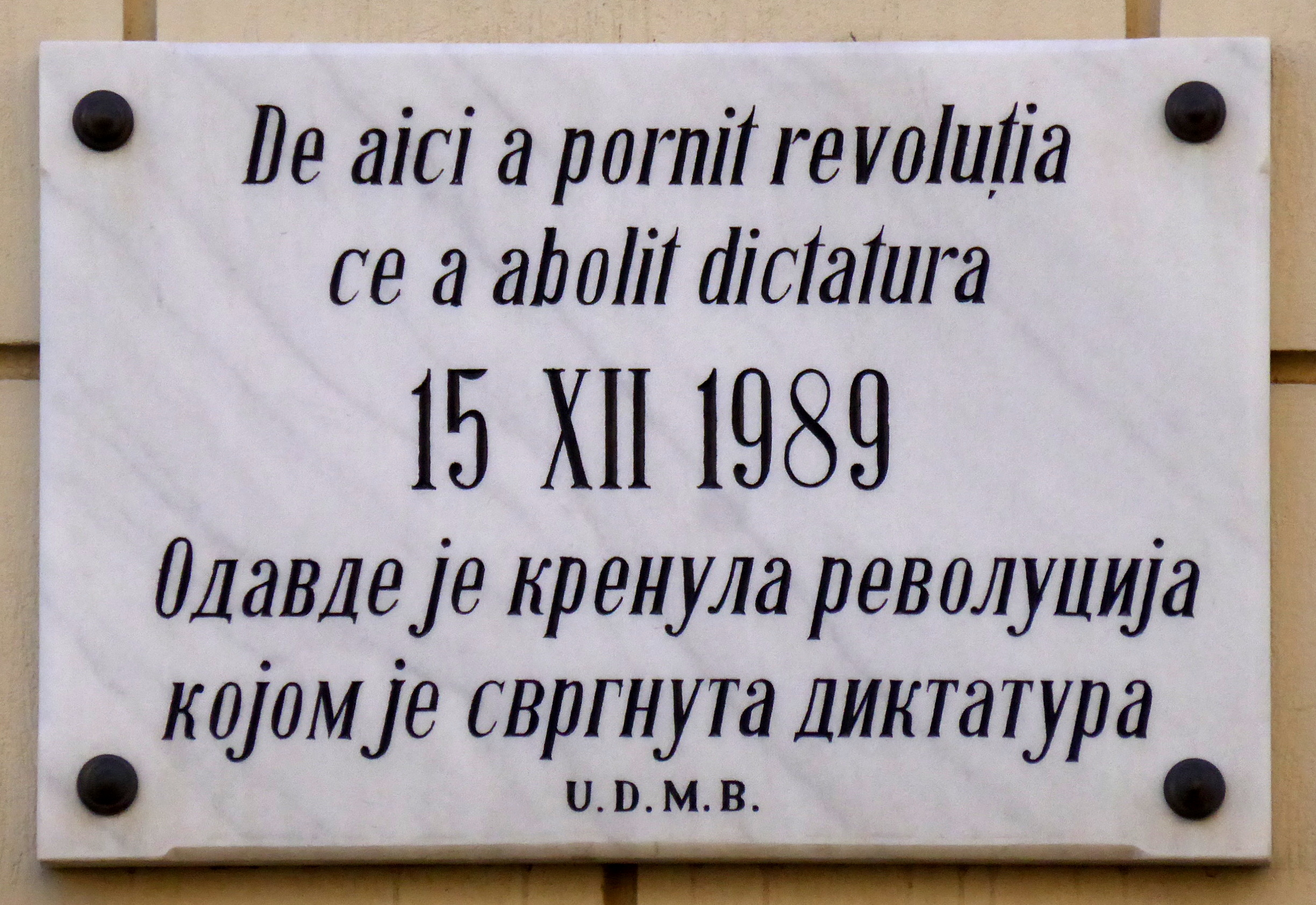
Commemorative plaques of the December 1989 Revolution in Hungarian, German, Romanian, and Serbian

The Reformed Church is a landmark in the collective mind of the people of Timișoara, being the place where the anti-communist revolution of 1989 started. On 15 December 1989, several hundred parishioners came to the defense of the Reformed pastor László Tőkés – an opponent of the communist regime – who had received an eviction sentence from the parish house in the same building as the Reformed Church. Two marble plaques placed near the entrance from Timotei Cipariu Street evoke in four languages (Romanian, Hungarian, German and Serbian) the December 1989 event: "This is where the Revolution that abolished the dictatorship started. 15.XII.1989".

== Architecture ==
The building consisting of a prayer hall and 11 dwellings belongs to the Anglo-Gothic style. It is covered with clinker bricks and has a rooster on one of its towers. The prayer hall has 250 m^{2}, with 312 seats in benches for parishioners and another 47 seats on the upper level for singers and choristers. Along with the standing places, the church can hold about 500 people. The organ was made in Leopold Wegenstein's workshop, and the solid oak pulpit, pews and furniture are the product of Jakab Fischer's workshop in Timișoara. The building, according to the original design, included the prayer hall, the parish office, the pastor's and the chaplain's home, as well as the private homes and commercial spaces that were to provide a decent and permanent income to the congregation.

The facades of the building are divided into five unequal registers, corresponding to each level. The first register, corresponding to the basement, is simple and without decorations. The second register, corresponding to the high ground floor, is differentiated by a treatment that imitates a parament. The next two registers (first and second floors) have the most decorative elements: apparent brickwork, marking of window frames, ogive-shaped arches, horizontal girdle and the rhythmic cornice of simple consoles. The fifth register corresponds to the gabled roof in the area of the towers.

Since 1996, there have been two bells in the tower of the building: one weighing 120 kg and the other 150 kg, cast in honor of the third meeting of the World Communion of Reformed Churches and the 1100th anniversary of the foundation of the Hungarian state. On the occasion of the 110th anniversary of the consecration of the Reformed Church, its representatives mounted on the facade a set of bells brought from Hungary. These are 11 bronze bells that, from 9 a.m. to 9 p.m., every fixed hour, sing a religious song. This can take between 20 and 60 seconds, and at 12 p.m. there is a five-minute mini-concert with six songs in a row. During the winter holidays, religious songs are replaced by carols. Thus, the Reformed Church became the first singing building in Timișoara.
