= Michelangelo Bridge, Timișoara =

Michelangelo Bridge Podul Michelangelo
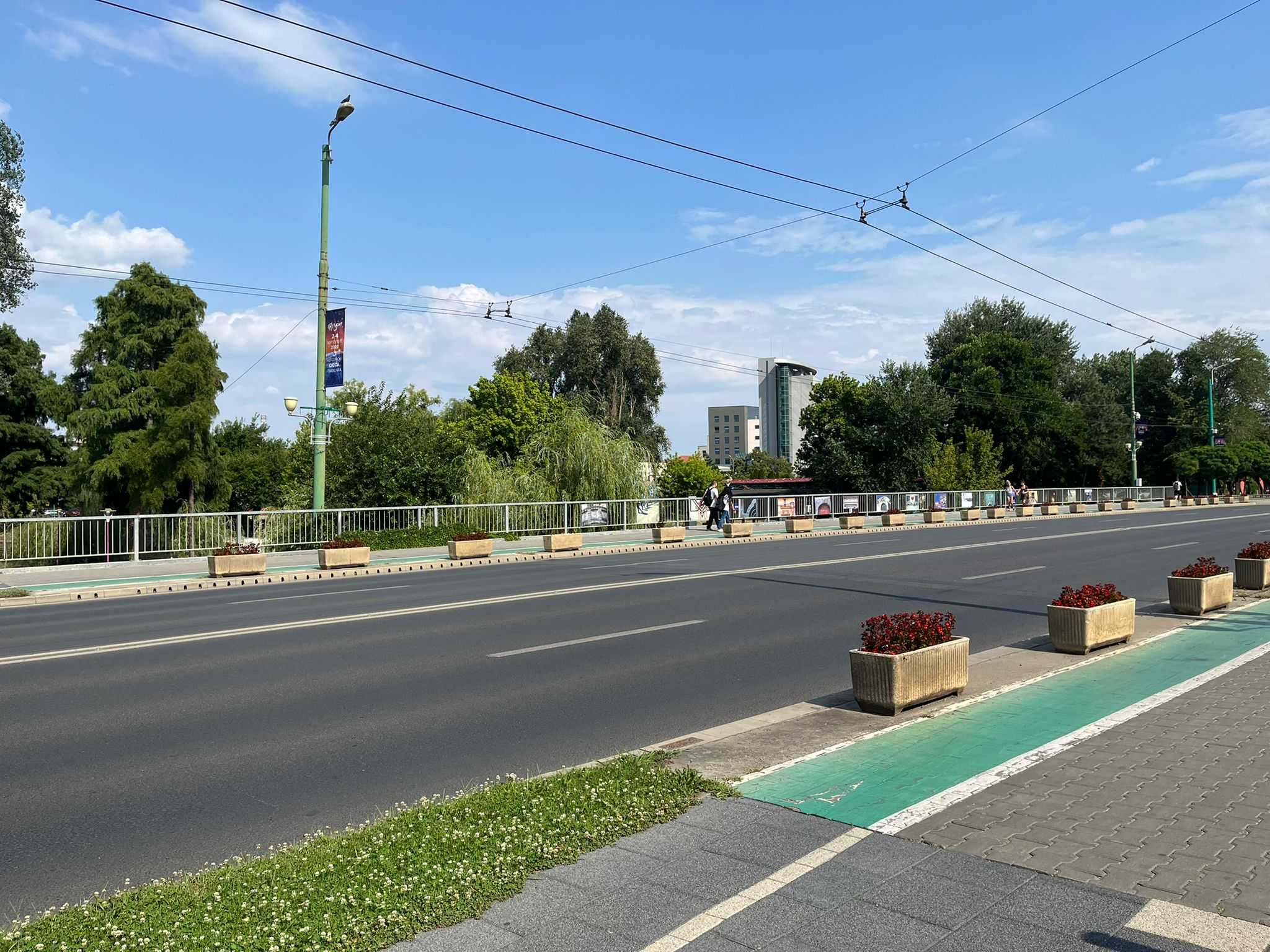
- Coordinates: 45°45′0″N 21°14′5″E
- Carries: Trolleybuses, motor vehicles, pedestrians, bicycles
- Crosses: Bega Canal
- Locale: Timișoara, Romania
- Preceded by: Michael the Brave Bridge
- Followed by: Decebalus Bridge

Characteristics
- No. of lanes: 2

History
- Architect: Nicolae Danciu
- Engineering design by: Decebal Anastasescu
- Built: 1970

Michelangelo Bridge (Romanian: Podul Michelangelo) is located in the western Romanian city of Timișoara and crosses the Bega River. It connects the Cetate district with the Elisabetin district. It carries private motorized traffic and trolleybuses.

Constructed in 1970 as part of the city's systematization, it is the bridge with the widest span, yet also the lowest in relation to the water level.

== History ==
The Michelangelo Bridge, along with the Mary Bridge and the Michael the Brave Bridge, is the third bridge linking the Cetate and the Elisabetin district. A wooden footbridge had spanned the Bega River in the Michelangelo-Cluj area since 1940. This was replaced in 1964 by a new footbridge, though the city's early 20th-century systematization plan had already envisioned a new north-south Timișoara boulevard crossing the Bega with a bridge. However, this bridge was only completed in 1970 when the area was further developed, making it the sole new bridge constructed in the second half of the 20th century.

The bridge, designed by engineer Decebal Anastasescu and architect Nicolae Danciu, features two lanes in each direction and pedestrian walkways on either side. It serves as one of the city's major traffic arteries. For both urban and architectural purposes, it was important that the bridge not obstruct the view of Michelangelo Boulevard. As a result, it is the lowest bridge in the city, positioned close to the water level. However, the bridge's structural design was carefully planned to allow the entire deck to be raised in the future, if the need for upstream navigation expansion arises.

Between 2014 and 2015, it entered into a rehabilitation plan that also included the construction of an underground passage.
