= Pleven Square =

Square in Timișoara, Romania

- City square
- Piața Plevnei
- Former name: Doja Square
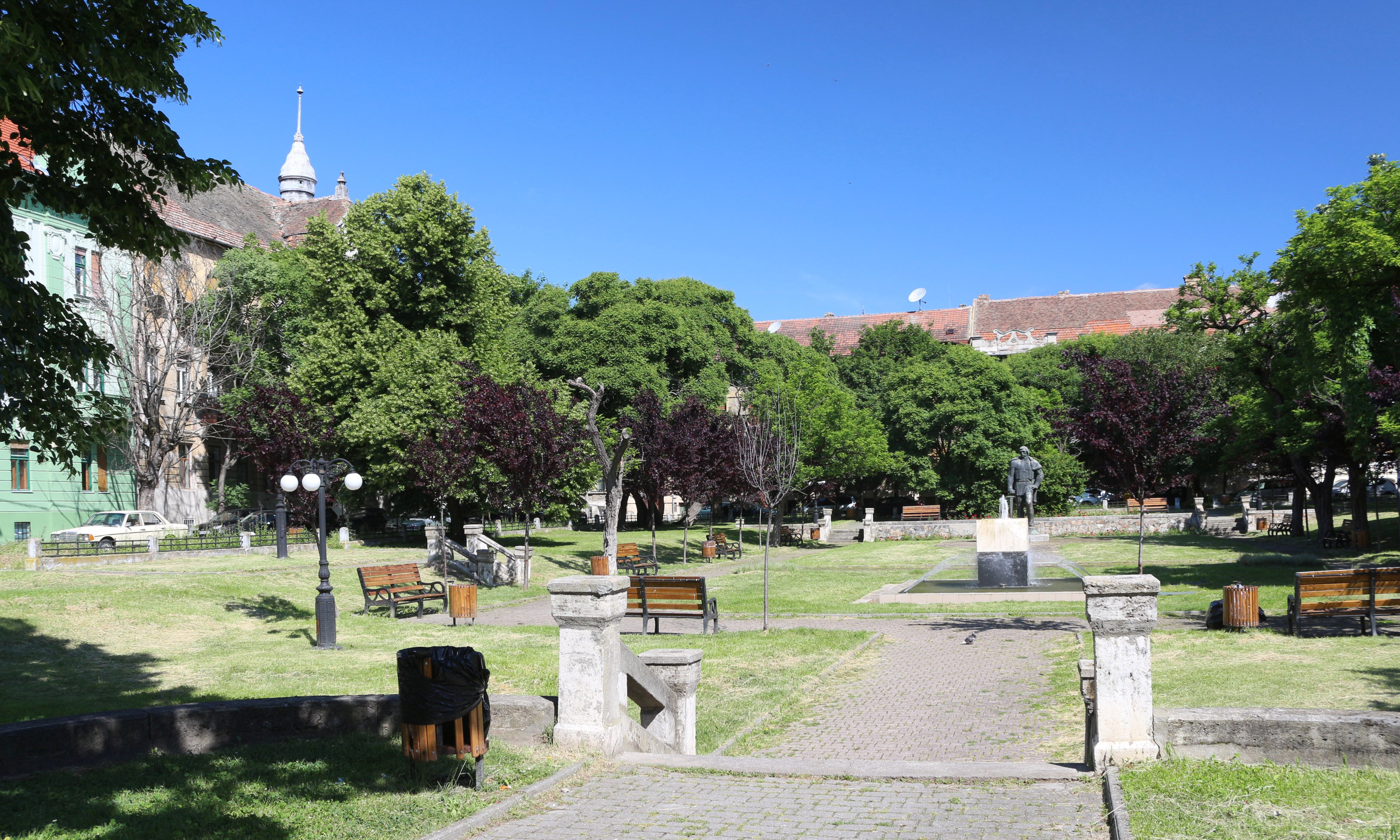
- Length: 199.15 m
- Architectural style: Secession
- Owner: Timișoara City Hall
- Location: Timișoara, Romania
- Interactive map of Pleven Square
- Coordinates: 45°44′52″N 21°13′15″E

Pleven Square (Romanian: Piața Plevnei) is a square located in the Elisabetin district of Timișoara, Romania. It is part of the urban site Old Iosefin, classified as a historic monument.

The area has been landscaped and the surrounding buildings have been built since 1903. Initially it was called Dózsa tér, and from 1919 Pleven Square. The square, rectangular in shape, borders on the north with General Henri Berthelot Street (former Caraiman Street), and on the south with Mitropolit Ioan Mețianu Street (former Brașov Street). In the middle of the square lies the Gheorghe Doja Park. Around the park the buildings are exclusively residential, in Art Nouveau style, forming a homogeneous architectural ensemble.

== History ==
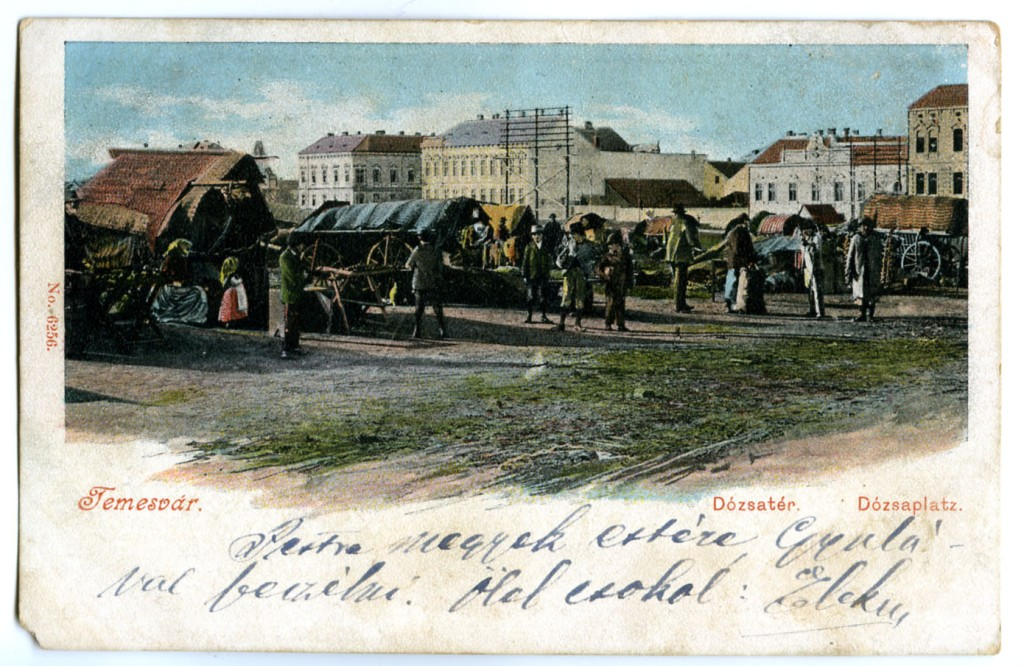
Dózsa tér before 1900

Before 1892, this area was east of the border of the Non ædificandi belt, on which it was forbidden to build until the renunciation of the military fortification character of the Timișoara Fortress. Until 1903, this wasteland was used as a wood depot and animal fair, the pig market (German: Viehmarkt; Hungarian: Disznóvásár tér). In 1893, the animal fair was moved, and the area was parceled out. In the center of the area was left an open portion, Dózsa tér (Hungarian for Doja Square), named after the leader of the peasant uprising of 1514, Gheorghe Doja. From 1919, following the annexation of Banat to the Kingdom of Romania, it was renamed Pleven Square, a name it still bears today. Shortly after the parcellation of the land, between 1903 and 1910, the east, north and west sides of the square were completed with buildings specific to the Secession style, forming one of the most elegant architectural ensembles of the city. The artist who made a remarkable contribution to the construction of buildings in this area is architect Martin Gemeinhardt. His facades are distinguished by lush decorations, with numerous floral and animal motifs. Gemeinhardt was one of the first architects of the Secession style in Timișoara, his works belonging to the so-called "floral phase". The south side of the square was completed after 1919 with villas. This side is not part of the urban site Old Iosefin, but only of its protection zone.

== Gheorghe Doja Park ==
The Gheorghe Doja Park, also known as Pleven Park, is a 0.52-ha park in the middle of the Pleven Square. The concept of the park, in the style of French gardens, belongs to landscaper Ferenc Niemetz. Its shape is strongly highlighted by tree alignments; the longest-lived specimens are those of linden (planted in the interwar period), locust (planted in the communist period) and cherry plum (planted in the years after the 1989 revolution). There are also ornamental trees, such as goldenrain tree. In the park, in the sunken area, there are a bronze statue of Gheorghe Doja, made in 1957 by Andrei Szobotka and the sculptural ensemble "Lesson about the cube", by Linda Menczel.

There were also plans for a botanical garden in this area. In this regard, in 1877, the municipality handed the former pig market over to the Society of Natural Sciences of Banat (founded in 1873). Due to the lack of necessary funds, the society had to give up the project.
