= Elisabetin Roman Catholic Church =

Catholic church in Elisabetin, Timișoara, Romania

Church of the Sacred Heart of Jesus
- Biserica „Preasfânta Inimă a lui Isus”
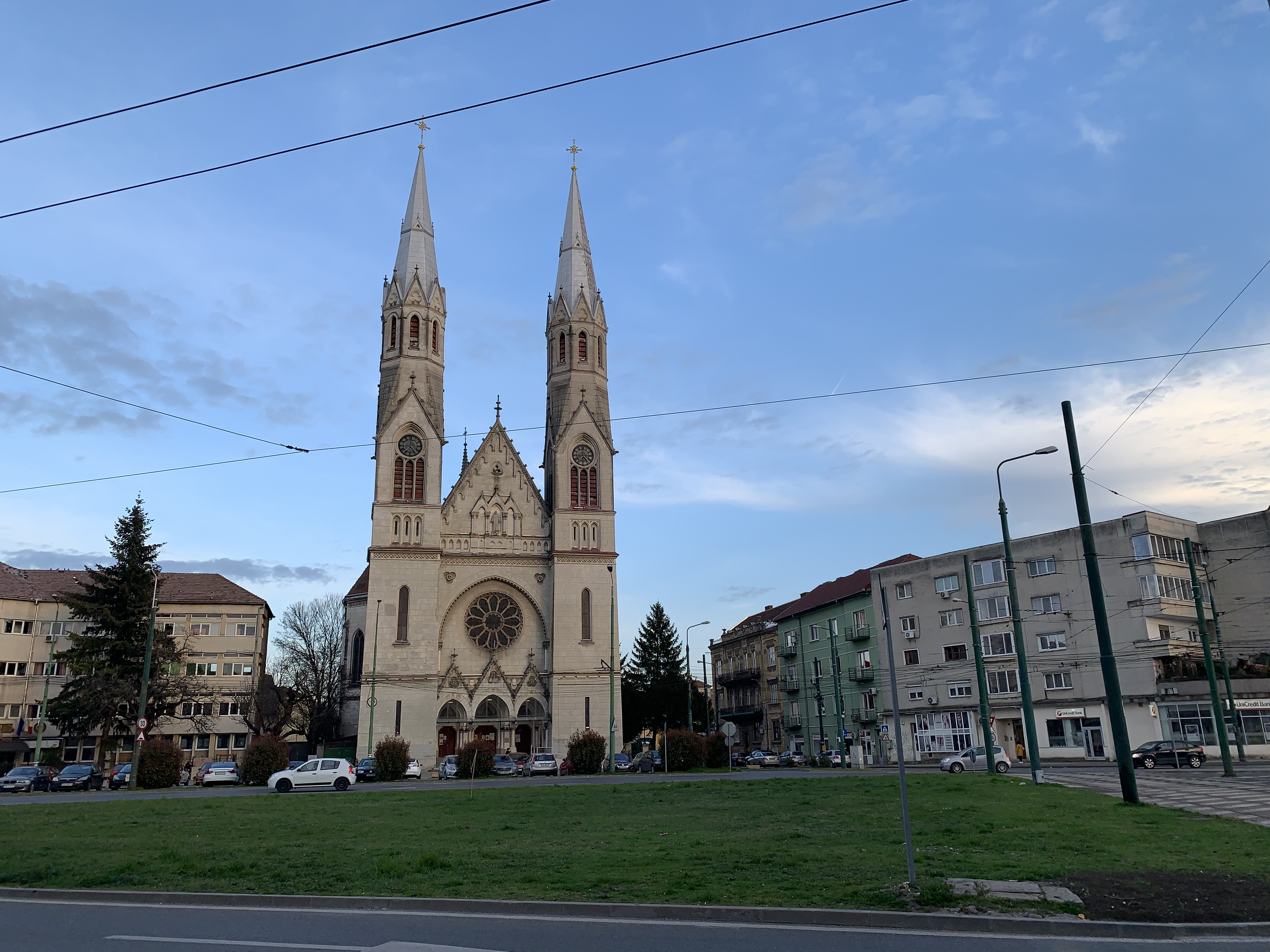

Religion
- Affiliation: Roman Catholic
- Patron: Sacred Heart of Jesus
- Year consecrated: 1919
- Status: Active

Location
- Location: Nicolae Bălcescu Square, Timișoara
- Interactive map of Church of the Sacred Heart of Jesus
- Coordinates: 45°44′28″N 21°13′35″E

Architecture
- Architect: Károly Salkovits
- Style: Gothic Revival
- Groundbreaking: 1912
- Completed: 1919

Specifications
- Capacity: 2,000
- Length: 52 m
- Width: 22 m
- Height (max): 57 m

Website
- parohiaelisabetin.ro

The Church of the Sacred Heart of Jesus is a Roman Catholic church in the Elisabetin district of Timișoara. Located in Nicolae Bălcescu Square, the neo-Gothic church was built between 1912 and 1919 after a project by architect Károly Salkovits. Holy Masses are celebrated in German, Hungarian and Romanian. The church is run by Salvatorian monks, a relatively young order founded in 1881 in Austria.

== History ==
As early as 1899, an association for the construction of a Roman Catholic church was formed in the Elisabetin district. The collection of the necessary sums began at the La trei coroane restaurant, where a fundraising event was organized every year. In 1902, a piece of land was bought in the Grundhaus Square (present-day Nicolae Bălcescu Square) from George Buresch. For its construction, the bishop of Cenad, Sándor Dessewffy, assistant to the pontifical throne, donated 50,000 Kronen and requested that the church be of the Salvatorian Order. In turn, mayor Carol Telbisz donated 60,000 bricks from the demolition of the old Piarist church and 80,000 Kronen.

Built in eclectic style with neo-Gothic influences, with a capacity of 2,000 seats, the church was designed by the architect Károly Salkovits, from Budapest, who also took over the management of the site. The foundation stone was laid in 1912, and the construction work was executed by Albert Schmidt and János Bagyánszky, so that on 31 August 1913 the crosses were consecrated by Bishop Julius Glattfelder and fixed on the towers. Although the church could have been completed and put into use by the end of 1914, due to the outbreak of the war, many workers were mobilized on the front, and the entrepreneurs were unable to comply with their contractual obligations. However, thanks to the efforts of the association established in 1899 for the construction of the church, animated by the entrepreneurial spirit and funds of the bank director Aladár Kudelich and school principal József Wittenberger, the work was resumed by immediately after the end of the war, and the church was consecrated on 17 August 1919. Upon completion, the pastorate was taken over by the Salvatorian Order, which will move its former residence here from the Mehala district.

== Architecture ==
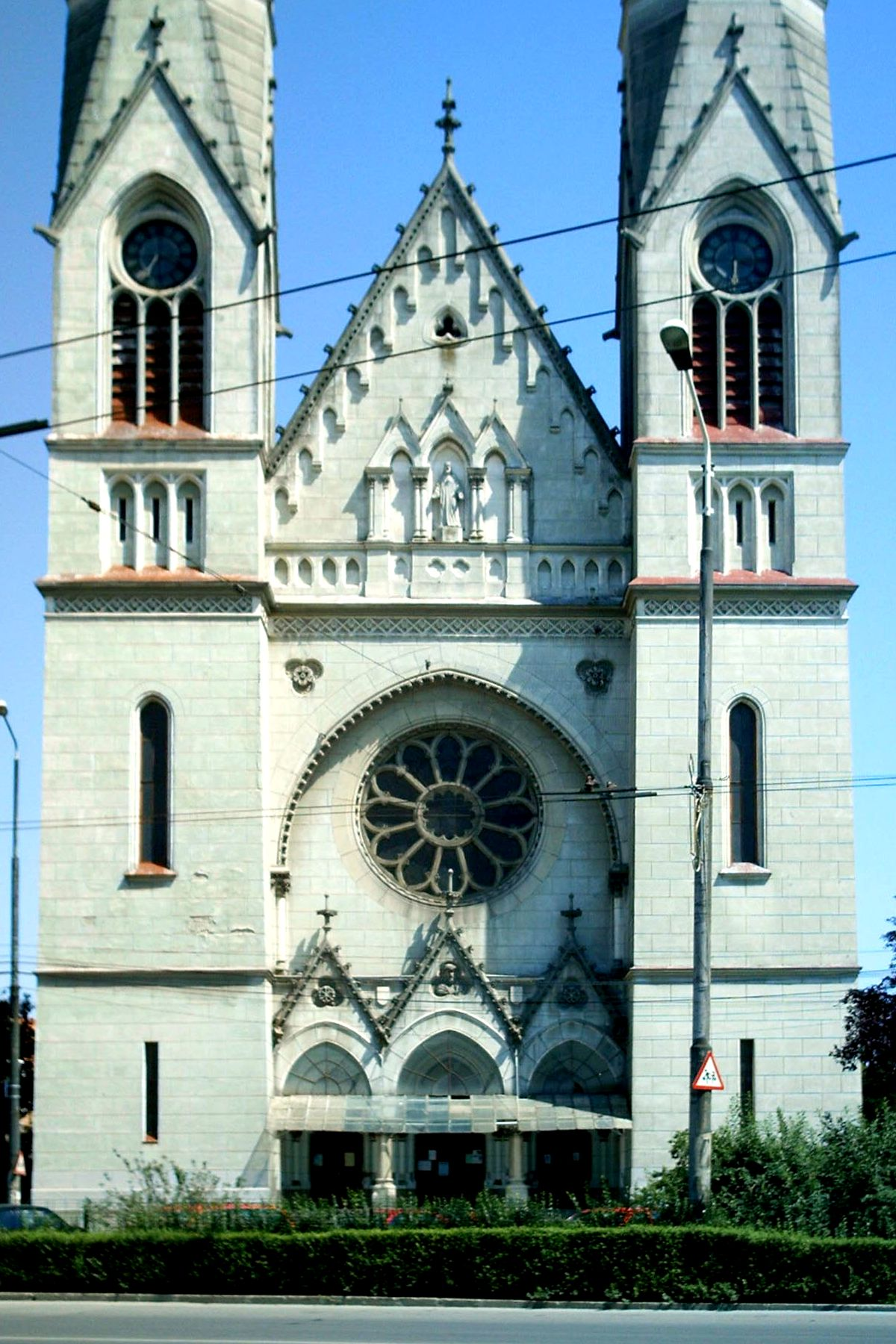
Architectural details of the facade

From an architectural point of view, the church is built in the eclectic style with neo-Gothic influences. Among the neo-Gothic elements we can observe: the shape of the gaps – broken arch, the decorative rosette above the entrance, gargoyles, a decorative turret from the east and the branched veins on the inner vault. The church impresses with its symmetry, slenderness, balanced distribution of interior space and giant stained glass windows that achieve good interior lighting in a warm yellow hue. The Gothic altar was brought from the old Roman Catholic church in Mehala, and the five altars that segment the interior were made in Ferdinand Stuflesser's workshop from Urtijëi (South Tyrol). The church is 52 m long and 22 m wide. It has four towers, of which two towers with a height of 57 m.

=== Interior ===
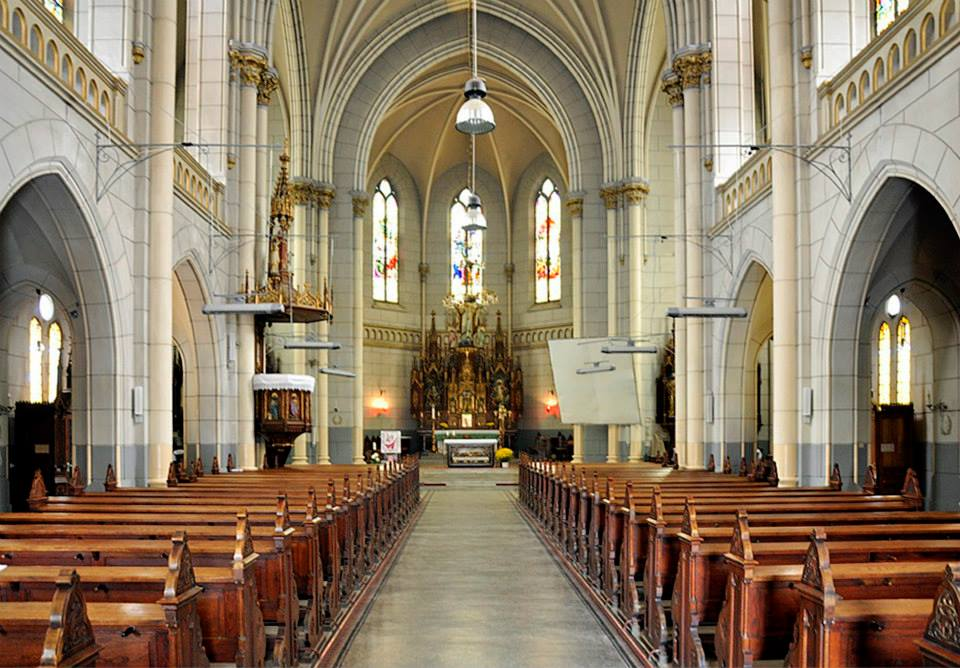
Interior of the church

The main altar was completed in 1929 and consecrated on the night of the Nativity that same year. Executed in the Gothic style, it features a life-size figure of Jesus with outstretched arms at its center. The tabernacle contains the Sacred Heart of Jesus, flanked on either side by sculptural elements crowned with richly ornamented turrets. The secondary altars were installed in the nave of the church in July 1929: to the left, the altar of the Virgin Mary holding the Child Jesus, and to the right, the altar dedicated to Saint Joseph. At a later date, two additional secondary altars were added – the altar of the Holy Cross and the altar of Saint Elizabeth.

In the left side aisle stands the statue of Jude the Apostle, while the right side aisle houses the icon of Johann Baptist Jordan, the founder of the Salvatorian Order. The 14 stations of the Via Crucis (Way of the Cross) are displayed along the two side aisles. To the left of the church entrance is the statue of the Virgin Mary of Lourdes, and to the right stands the statue of Saint Anthony.

The chandelier in the middle of the church, made of Valencia glass, was donated by the Benő Skoday family.

The 40 benches were acquired through donations from the faithful, followed by the installation of four confessionals designed in harmony with the church's architectural style. These four confessionals, which are still in use today, were crafted in the workshop of Jenő Bittenbinder.

The rosette at the entrance to the church, with the image of Jesus, is made by the local company Szappanos.
