= Michael the Brave Bridge, Timișoara =

Michael the Brave Bridge Podul Mihai Viteazul
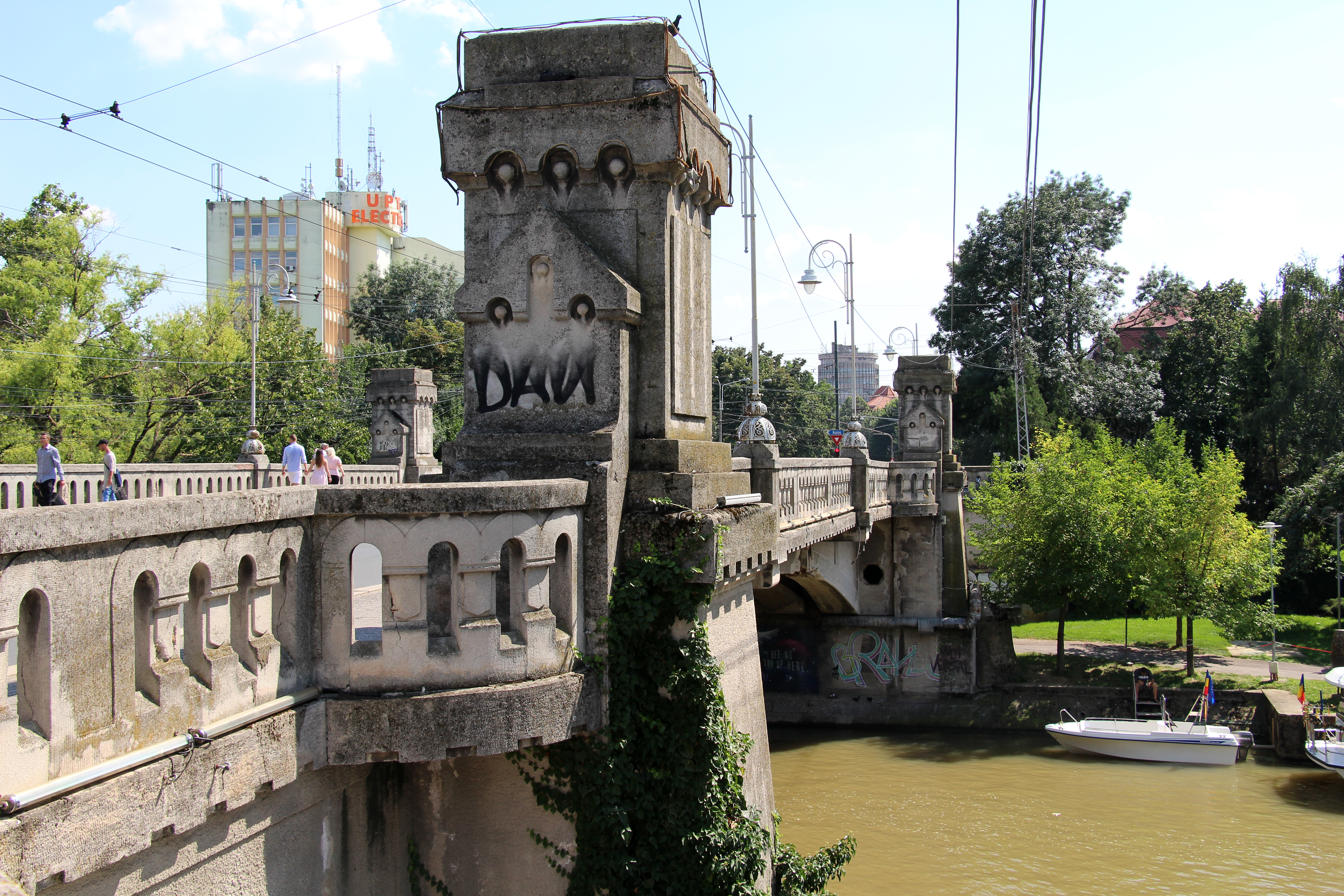
- Coordinates: 45°44′54″N 21°13′32″E
- Carries: Trolleybuses, motor vehicles, pedestrians, bicycles
- Crosses: Bega Canal
- Locale: Timișoara, Romania
- Other name(s): Andrei Șaguna Bridge; Bishop's Bridge
- Preceded by: Mary Bridge
- Followed by: Michelangelo Bridge

Characteristics
- Width: 10 m (33 ft)

History
- Architect: Kálman Gerster
- Engineering design by: Károly Lád
- Opened: 24 November 1913

Michael the Brave Bridge (Romanian: Podul Mihai Viteazul), formerly Andrei Șaguna Bridge and Bishop's Bridge, is located in the western Romanian city of Timișoara. It crosses the Bega and connects the Cetate district with the Elisabetin district. It carries private motorized traffic and trolleybuses. The bridge is ten meters wide, and two and a half meters wide for pedestrians. On the sides, at the ends, stairs descend on either side to the Bega Canal cliff.

== Name ==
During the time of the Austrian Empire, the bridge was known as Bischofsbrücke (Bishop's Bridge), a name that came from the former Bischofsstraße (Bishop's Street), now Michael the Brave Boulevard. This street led across the undeveloped fortress outskirts to the Meierhöfe area (now known as Elisabetin). Every year, a procession led by the bishop crossed the bridge on its way to the former Rosalia Chapel, following the city's vow to eliminate the plague after its outbreak in 1738–1739. Following the Austro-Hungarian Compromise of 1867, the German name Bischofsbrücke was officially translated to Püspök híd in Hungarian. An alternative Hungarian name, Erzsébetvárosi híd (Elisabetin Bridge), referred to the old Hungarian name of the Elisabetin district. After the partition of Banat in 1919, the bridge was given its current Romanian name. During the socialist era, it was temporarily renamed Podul Tinereții (Bridge of Youth).

== History ==
Construction on the current bridge began in 1911, replacing an older wooden bridge that had been in place since 1718 and reinforced in 1898. The new bridge was designed to be particularly impressive, drawing inspiration from Prague's Charles Bridge. With a remarkable width of ten meters, it was well-suited to the traffic conditions of the time. The architectural design was entrusted to Kálman Gerster, an architect from Budapest, while the technical design was handled by engineer Károly Lád from the engineering office in Timișoara. Despite a few minor delays due to unfavorable weather in 1912, the project proceeded smoothly. By 24 November 1913, the bridge was opened for vehicle traffic, having already been accessible to pedestrians shortly before.

The four pillars atop the bridgeheads were intended to be adorned with statues of four notable bishops from the Roman Catholic Diocese of Csanád: St. Gerhard, the first bishop of Csanád, József Lonovics, Sándor Dessewffy, and László Kőszeghy. However, this plan could not be carried out due to the outbreak of World War I. While the bridge was completed, the pedestals remained vacant. In the latter half of the 20th century, there were plans to widen the bridge, but this idea was also not realized.
