= Turkish House, Timișoara =

Dissel House
- Casa Dissel
- Interactive map of the Dissel House area
- Alternative names: Turkish House

General information
- Architectural style: Oriental
- Location: 2 Evliya Çelebi Street, Timișoara, Romania
- Coordinates: 45.74410°N 21.22833°E

Dissel House, better known by the local name Turkish House, is a historical building in the Elisabetin district of Timișoara, Romania. It is considered one of the oldest houses in Timișoara and the oldest in the non ædificandi area of the fortress.

== History ==
Legend has it that it was built in the 16th–17th centuries, being the only house left from the time of the Temeşvar Eyalet, which is why it is called the Turkish House in the monographies about Timișoara. The legend also says that here would have been the harem of a pasha, and from the cellar there would be tunnels leading to the fortress and to Belgrade or Petrovaradin.

The 1990 expertise of architect Vasile Oprișan found that both the type of bricks used in the construction and the size of the foundations comply with the Austrian norms of the 18th century. In fact, it is the house of engineer captain Kaspar Dissel, one of the first three houses built in the area of the current Elisabetin district after the conquest of the fortress in 1716 by the Habsburgs. On the plans from 1734, no building appears in the Elisabetin area. On the plans from 1746, apart from Dissel's house, there are the Rosalia Chapel, built between 1739–1740 and demolished in the 1960s, which was located roughly on the current St. Rosalia Street, and Cambiatura, a post horse exchange point located south of Dissel's house. It is the only one still preserved among the three buildings.

Between 1759 and 1763 it belonged to the Misericordian monks.

== Architecture ==
The house is built in oriental style, having three levels: cellar with cylindrical ceiling, finished with a flat vault, ground floor and first floor. Although legend has it that it was built over the old Turkish vaulted cellar, expertise has shown that both the basement and the rest of the house have a unitary construction and are built of the same materials.
