= Carmen Sylva Park =

Park in Timișoara, Romania

- Doina Park
- Parcul Carmen Sylva
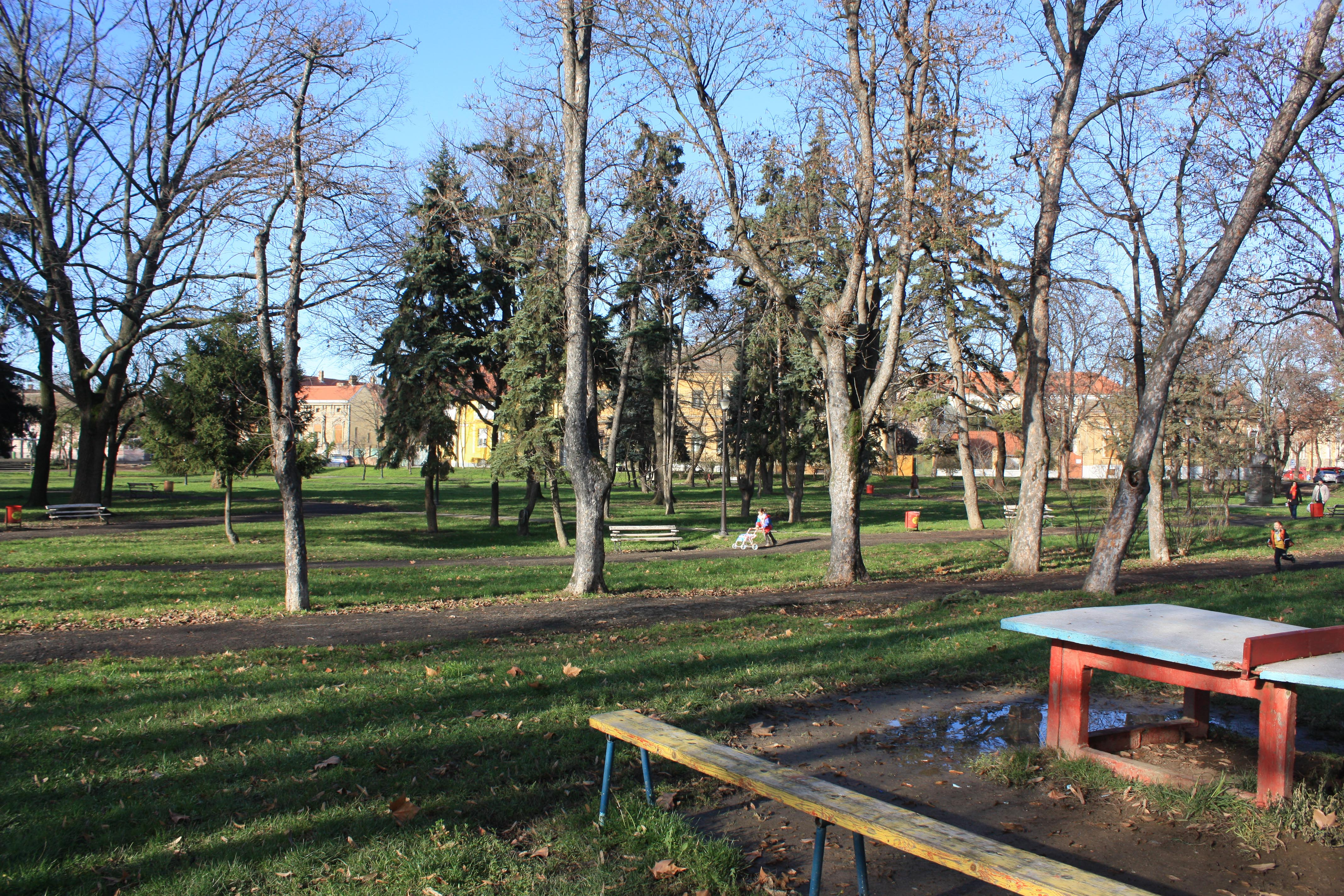
- Carmen Sylva Park before the renovation of 2011
- Interactive map of Carmen Sylva Park
- Location: Timișoara, Romania
- Coordinates: 45°44′38″N 21°13′23″E
- Area: 2.04 ha
- Designer: Wilhelm Mühle
- Administrator: Timișoara City Hall
- Species: 40

The Carmen Sylva Park (Romanian: Parcul Carmen Sylva), formerly Doina Park, is an urban park in the Elisabetin district of Timișoara, Romania.

== History ==
The creation of a People's Park in Elisabetin was decided on 31 January 1895, during a meeting of a local initiative committee of neighborhood residents at Novotny Restaurant. The statutes of the Elisabetin Park Association (Erzsébetvárosi Parkegylet) were drafted at a subsequent committee meeting on 9 February of the same year. According to the statute, founding members contributed an annual fee of 20 forints (ordinary members 2 forints) to support the project. Material donations were also plentiful: the gardener Franz Niemetz donated 100 trees, while merchant Miksa Weiss provided the wood for benches, which were made free of charge by carpenters Mihály Albert and József Tichy.

The Timișoara city administration allocated a vacant plot of land for the future park, situated between the Timișoara–Baziaș railway line and Gheorghe Doja and Romulus streets. The project to create the park was initiated by Eduard Stumpfoll, the director of the vocational school for wood and metal processing in Timișoara, who resided in Elisabetin. The park's plans were designed by horticulturist Wilhelm Mühle, a member of the park's organizing committee. While the park itself would not be established until 1898, the residents of the neighborhood had already planted 1,200 fir seedlings by 1896.

A new phase in the park's development, called Carmen Sylva, took place between 1927 and 1935, through the efforts of the association and the Municipal Horticultural Service. Following the closure of the Timișoara–Baziaș railway in 1932, the park was expanded. By 1935, in addition to the trees planted in 1896, the park was further enhanced with the addition of roses and flowers. A caretaker, employed by the Park Association, ensured the peace and cleanliness of the area. After World War II, the park was renamed Doja, and in 1970, it was changed to Doina Park.

The park underwent a full renovation in 2011, featuring a hexagonal wooden pavilion, an artesian fountain with lighting effects, and a children's playground.
