= Elisabetin Orthodox Church =

Romanian Orthodox church in Timișoara, Romania

Church of the Assumption of Virgin Mary
- Biserica Adormirea Maicii Domnului
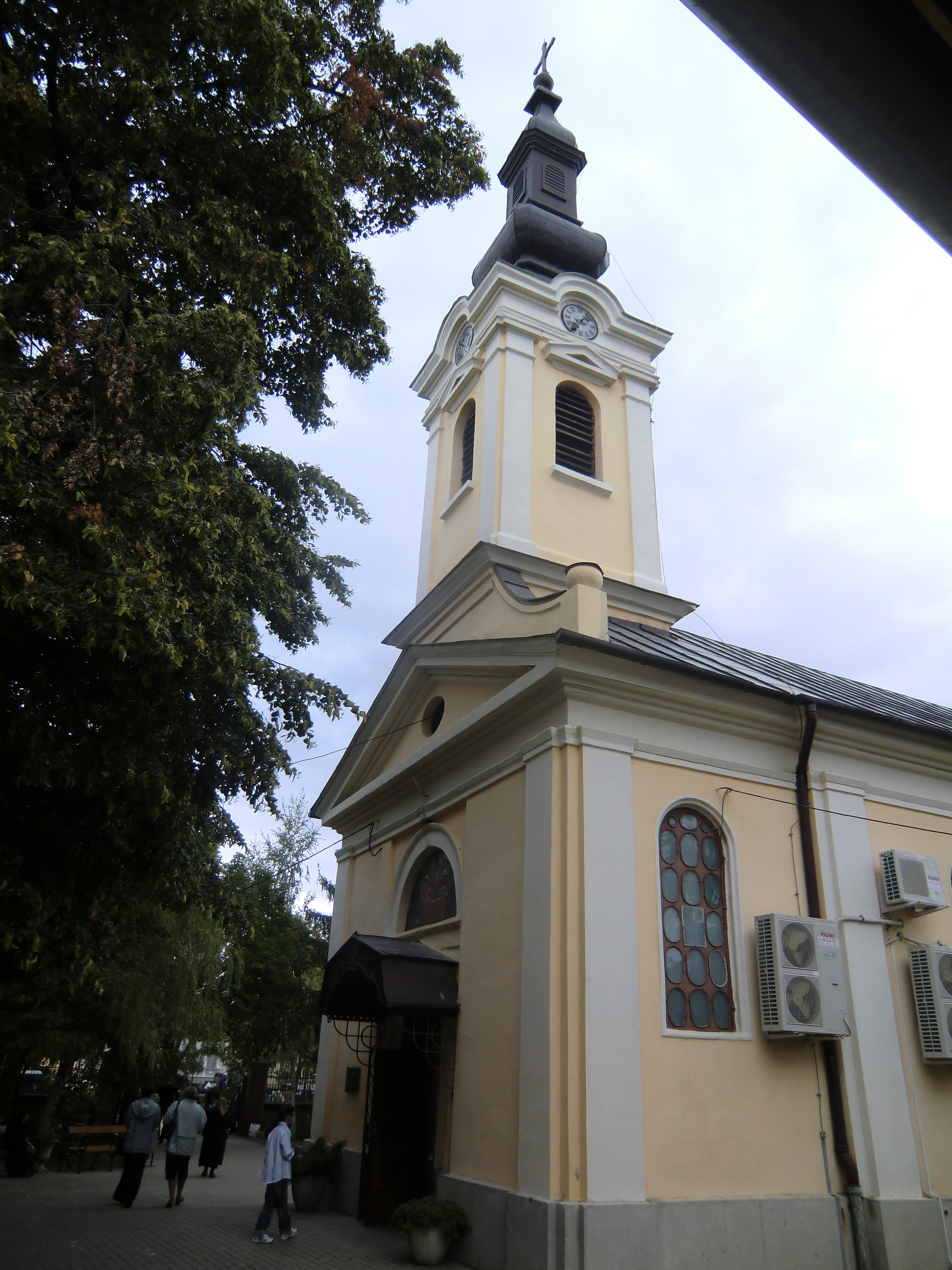

Religion
- Affiliation: Romanian Orthodox
- Patron: Assumption of Mary
- Year consecrated: 1927
- Status: Active

Location
- Location: Archpriest George Dragomir Street, Timișoara, Romania
- Interactive map of Church of the Assumption of Virgin Mary
- Coordinates: 45°44′30″N 21°13′47″E

Architecture
- Architect: Ștefan Toth
- Style: Baroque
- Groundbreaking: 1894

Specifications
- Length: 24.41 m
- Width: 7.7 m

The Church of the Assumption of Virgin Mary (Romanian: Biserica Adormirea Maicii Domnului) is a Romanian Orthodox church in the Elisabetin district of Timișoara, Romania. It is located on Archpriest George Dragomir Street and is opposite the Cross Square (Piața Crucii). Its peculiarity is that, unlike other buildings, it was not shared with the Serbian Orthodox. Although the church has historical value, it is not on the list of monuments of the County Directorate of Culture.

== History ==
A church had existed on this site since 1784, which in turn was built on the site of a wooden church from 1794 destroyed in a fire. At first there was no tower, only a cross with a globe was placed on the roof above the altar. The tower was added in 1836.

In 1894, according to the plans of architect Ștefan Toth, the construction of the current church began. It is 24.41m long and 7.7m wide. The church tower is in the Baroque style. The wall paintings inside the church were made by Iulian Toader from Arad, and the sculptures and woodwork were made by Traian Novac.

The church was consecrated on 6 November 1927. It is a simple hall building with a recessed facade tower, whose exterior design is reminiscent of the Banat country churches. Only the design of the interior with a barrel vault and an apse that is the same width as the nave is different.
