= Nicolae Bălcescu Square, Timișoara =

Square in Timișoara, Romania

Nicolae Bălcescu Square
- City square
- {{{other_names}}}
- Piața Nicolae Bălcescu
- Former names: Alexandru Lahovary Square • Marshal Tito Square
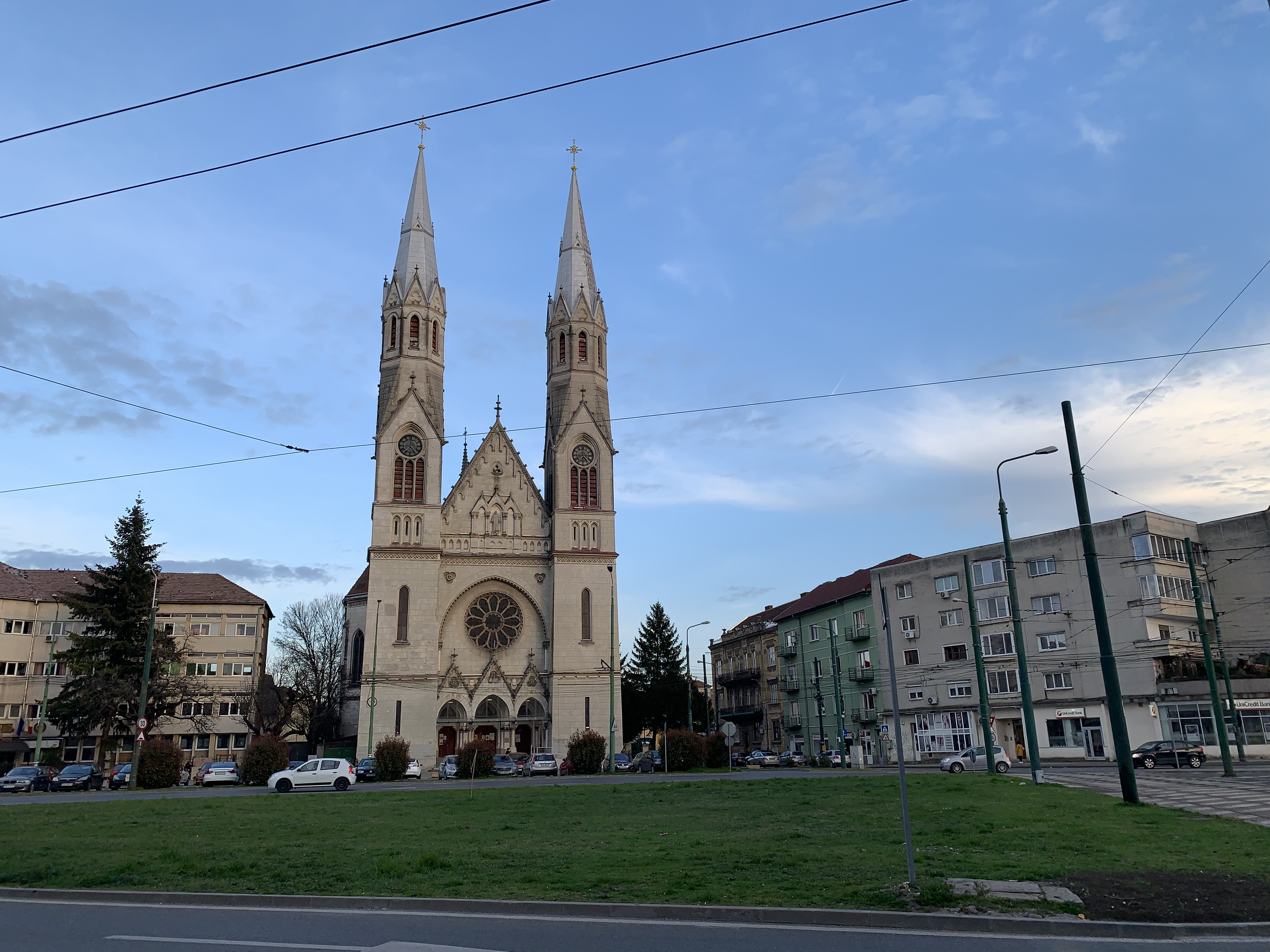
- The Nicolae Bălcescu Square with its Roman Catholic church
- Length: 86.42 m
- Owner: Timișoara City Hall
- Location: Timișoara, Romania
- Interactive map of Nicolae Bălcescu Square
- Coordinates: 45°44′28.7″N 21°13′35.1″E

The Nicolae Bălcescu Square is a square and junction in Timișoara. It is named after Romanian historian, writer and revolutionary Nicolae Bălcescu (1819–1852). The square is located in the Elisabetin district. Well-known buildings of the square are the Sacred Heart Church, a Roman Catholic church completed in 1919 and the ensemble of the Grigore Moisil Theoretical High School.

During the Austrian Empire, the square was called Grundhausplatz. As a result of the Austro-Hungarian Compromise of 1867, this name was translated into Hungarian: Telekház tér. After the partition of Banat and starting with 1919, the square was renamed Alexandru Lahovary Square, after the name of Foreign Minister Alexandru Lahovary. In 1947, its name was once again changed to Marshal Tito Square, a name it bore for a short time. The square finally got its current name in the early 1950s.

== History ==
The square lies in the Elisabetin district, one of Timișoara's historic neighborhoods. It developed during the city's expansion beyond the former fortress walls, after building restrictions surrounding the fortifications were removed in the late 19th century. With these limits lifted, residential areas extended southward, and new public spaces—such as this square—began to form where streets intersected with what had once been agricultural land.

Today the square functions mainly as a transport hub, but historically it acted as a neighborhood center in Elisabetin rather than a monumental ceremonial or civic space. It linked the main streets extending from the former fortress suburbs and played an important role in structuring the surrounding area as it developed during the late 19th and early 20th centuries.
