= Elisabetin =

Elisabetin Erzsébetváros (Hungarian) Elisabethstadt (German) Елизабетштат (Serbian)
- District of Timișoara Romania
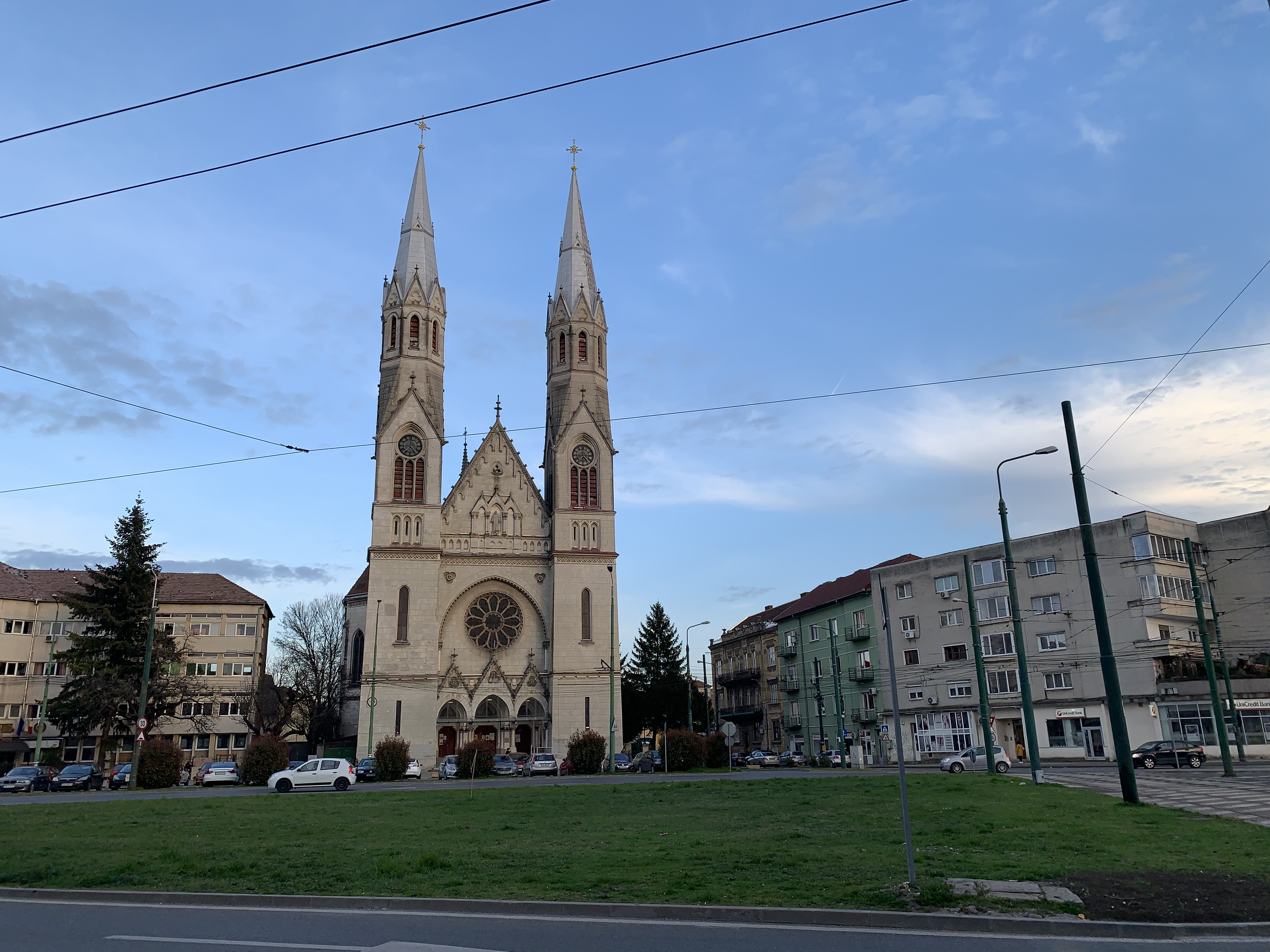
- Nicolae Bălcescu Square with its Roman Catholic church in Elisabetin
- Etymology: Empress Elisabeth of Austria
- Interactive map of Elisabetin
- Coordinates: 45°44′29″N 21°13′32″E
- Country: Romania
- County: Timiș
- City: Timișoara
- Established: 1718

Area
  - Total: 6.68 km^{2} (2.58 sq mi)

Elisabetin (Hungarian: Erzsébetváros; German: Elisabethstadt; Serbian: Елизабетштат, romanized: Elizabetštat) is a historic district of Timișoara. It is noted for the vast reserve of 1900s-style architecture and the multitude of parks. Also here is the university area of the city with the related buildings (student dormitories, canteens, laboratories, sports complexes, etc.), many of which have historical value.

== History ==
The land on which Elisabetin is located today was ceded to the inhabitants of Cetate by Grundbrief des bürgerlichen Terrains (Deed of ownership of citizen lands) on 5 April 1718. Until after 1750, there were only three buildings in what is now Elisabetin: the Rosalia Chapel built in 1739–1740 (demolished in the 1960s), the Dissel House and the Cambiatura (a place for exchanging post-horses); of these, only the Dissel House is preserved to this day. Only after 1750, until 1770, a residential neighborhood appeared between the present-day Church Square and Cozia Street, south of the esplanade, the 948-meter-wide non ædificandi belt. The neighborhood was called Maierele Vechi (Hungarian: Régi Majorok; German: Alte Meierhöfe) or Maierele Vechi Valahe and was inhabited by Romanians coming from Cetate (where they were no longer allowed to live) or Palanca Mică. Around the present-day Romulus and Alexandru Odobescu streets, then, until 1770, on some parts of Alexandru Odobescu and 1 December streets, the Maierele Vechi Germane, inhabited by Germans, appeared and developed. Over time, the two neighborhoods merged spatially and in 1896 were named Elisabetin, in honor of Empress Elisabeth of Austria, nicknamed Sissi. In the interwar period, the Romanian administration changed the name to Principesa Elisabeta ("Princess Elisabeth"), often shortened to Elisabeta. After the temporary designation Nicolae Bălcescu in the socialist era, the current name is Elisabetin.

Elisabetin had a rural appearance for a long time. By 1801 there were 188 houses built mainly of adobe and covered with reeds and shingles, constructions that could be done without prior approval; a construction approval issued by the Technical Service of the city was needed for brick houses. After 1876, the present-day Nicolae Bălcescu Square, where on the current location of the Catholic church were the buildings of the district's town hall and primary school, is outlined as the functional center of Elisabetin. Only after 1892, after the cancellation of Timișoara's status as military fortress and subsequent abolition of the construction ban on the esplanade, Elisabetin experiences a strong urban development, both in area and built-up density.

== Buildings and structures ==
A valuable reserve with heritage buildings, built at the beginning of the 20th century, houses representative of the "floral phase" of the Timișoara Secession, some unique, is located in Pleven Square. A typical artist for these constructions was the architect Martin Gemeinhardt (1877–1934), whose facades are imposing through lush decorations, with numerous species of animals and plants, which make up large-scale compositions. In this square, one of the most elegant architectural ensembles of the city was built, after the land was parceled out on the place where, until 1903, the livestock market operated.

=== Places of worship ===
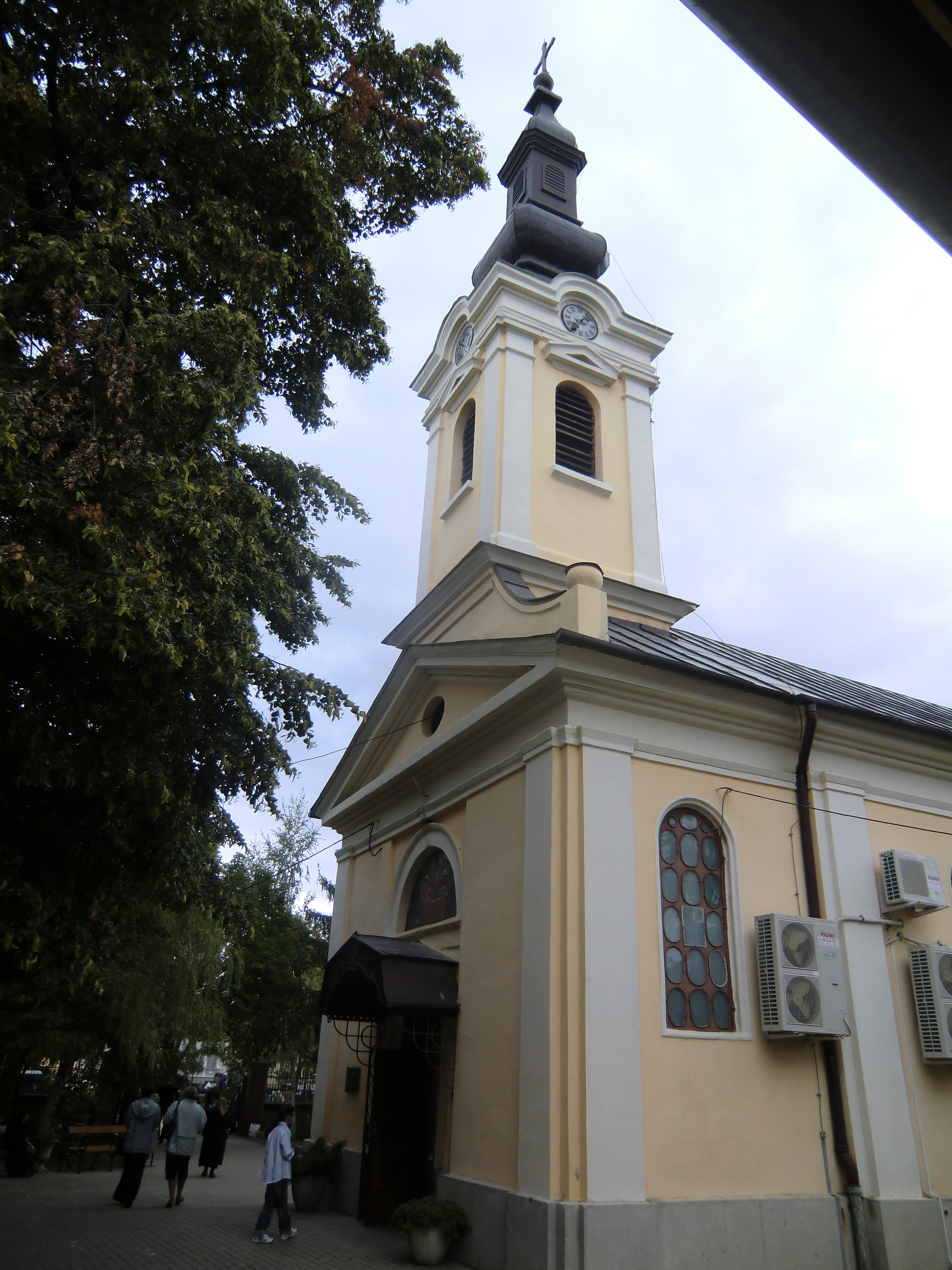
Church of the Assumption of Mary (1894)

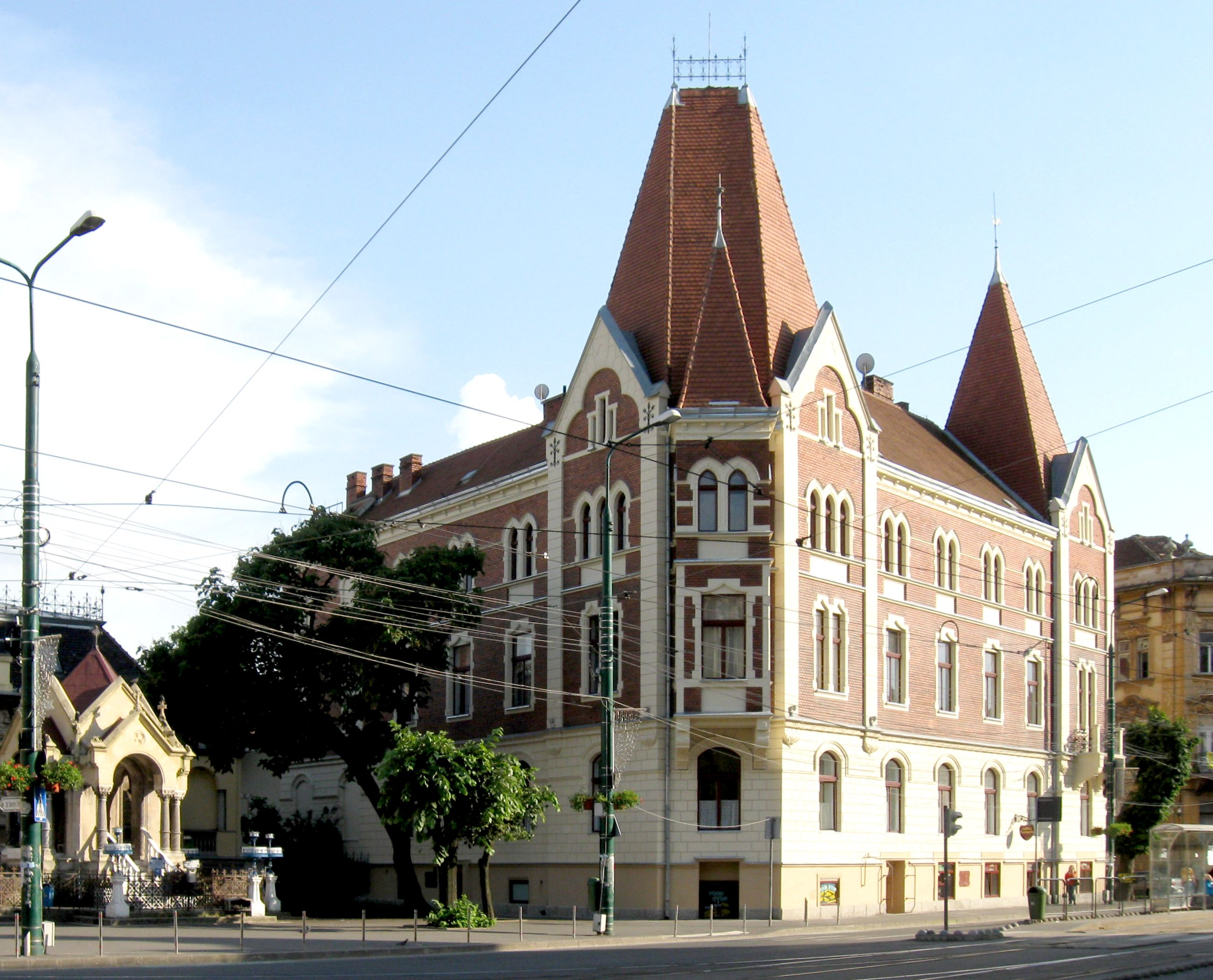
Reformed Church (1902) in St. Mary Square

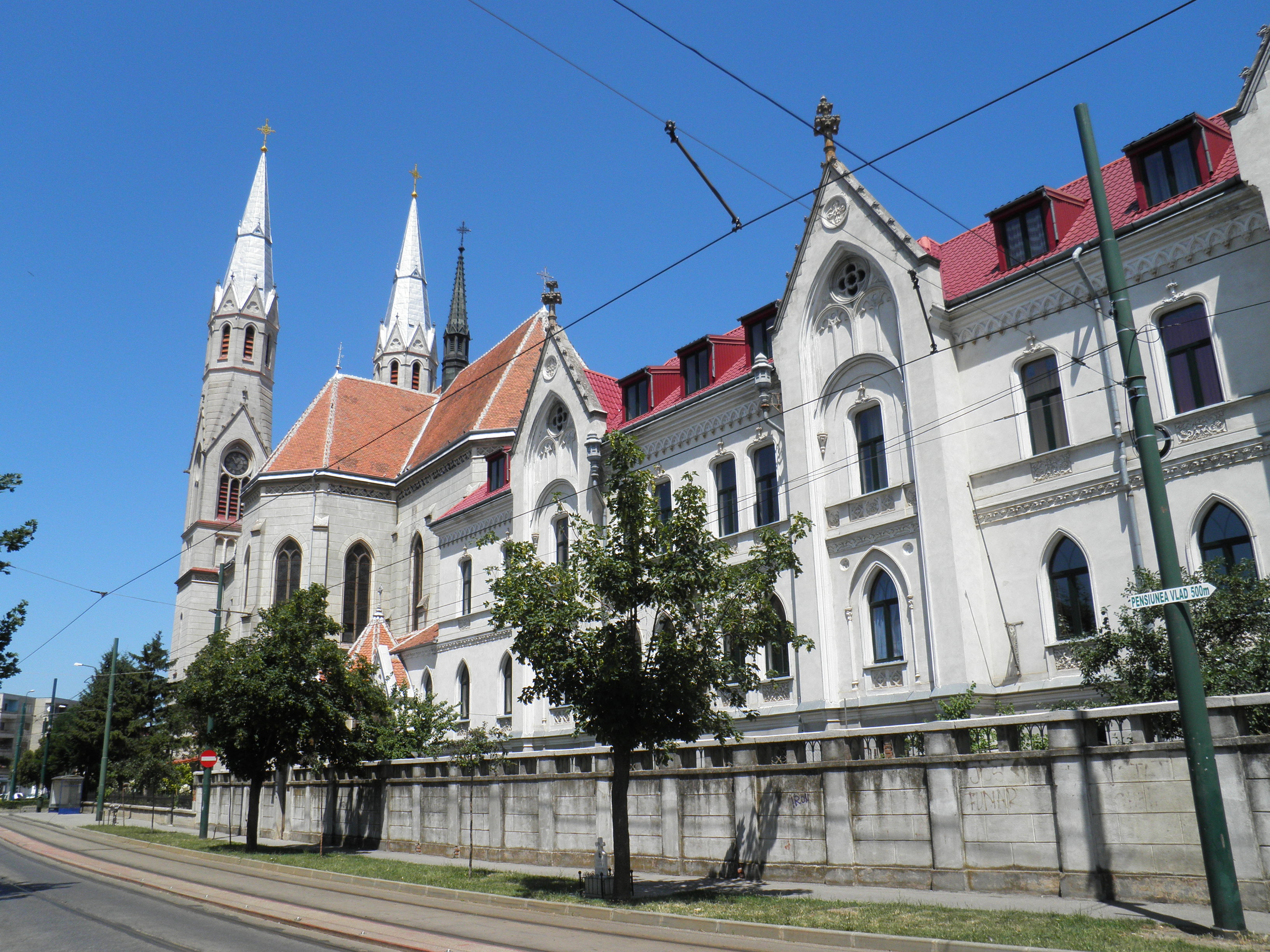
Church of the Sacred Heart of Jesus (1919) and the Monastery of the Salvatorian Order

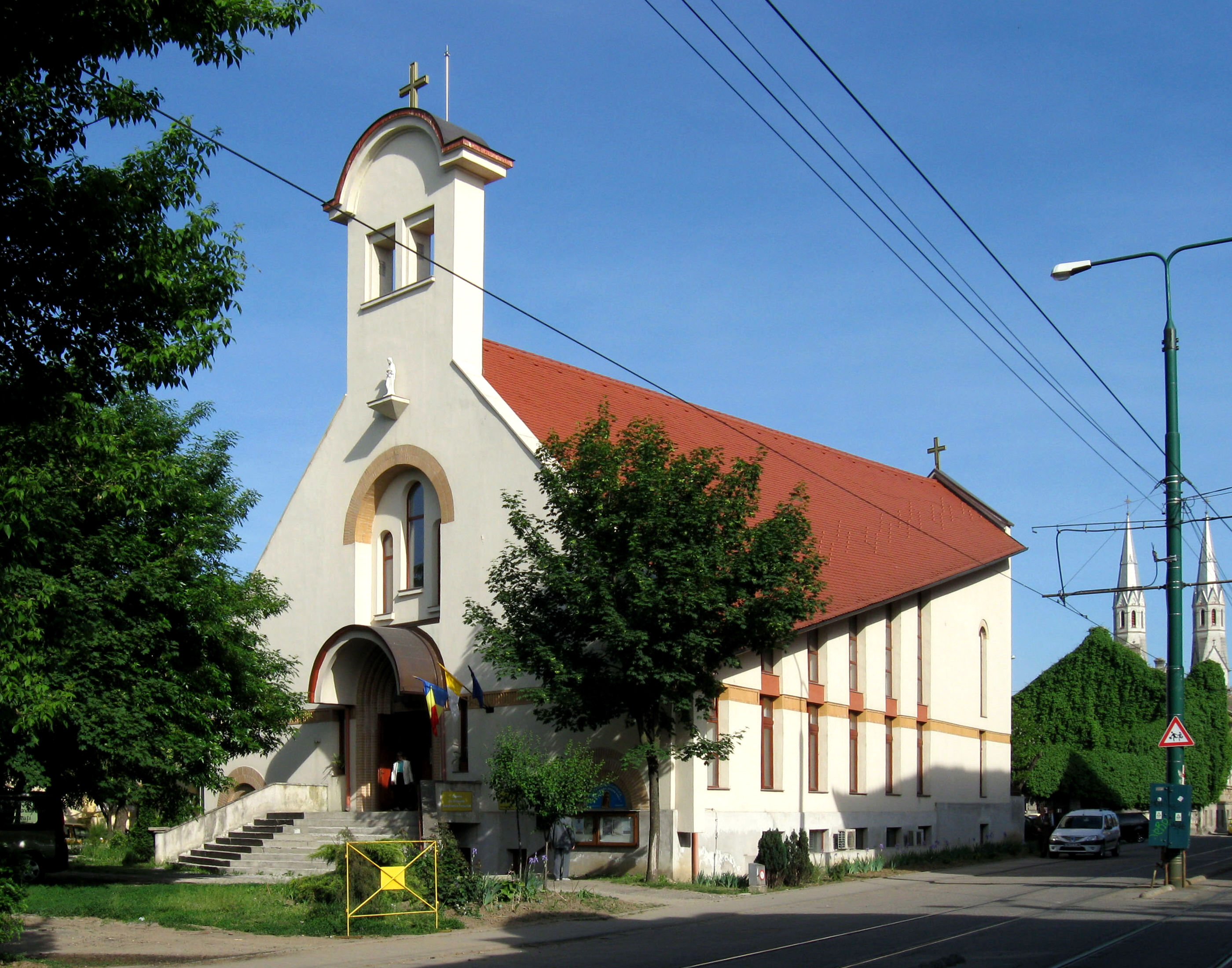
Church of St. Mary Queen of Peace and Unity (2005)

=== Palaces ===
- Bécsi Palace (1906)
- Gemeinhardt Palace (1909)
- Hartlauer Palace (1910)
- Klein Palace (1908)
- Marschall Palace (1904)
- Palace of the Reformed Community (1902)
- Vértes Palace (1910)

=== Bridges ===
- Mary Bridge
- Michael the Brave Bridge
- Michelangelo Bridge
