= St. Mary Square, Timișoara =

Square in Timișoara, Romania

St. Mary Square
- City square
- {{{other_names}}}
- Piața Sfânta Maria
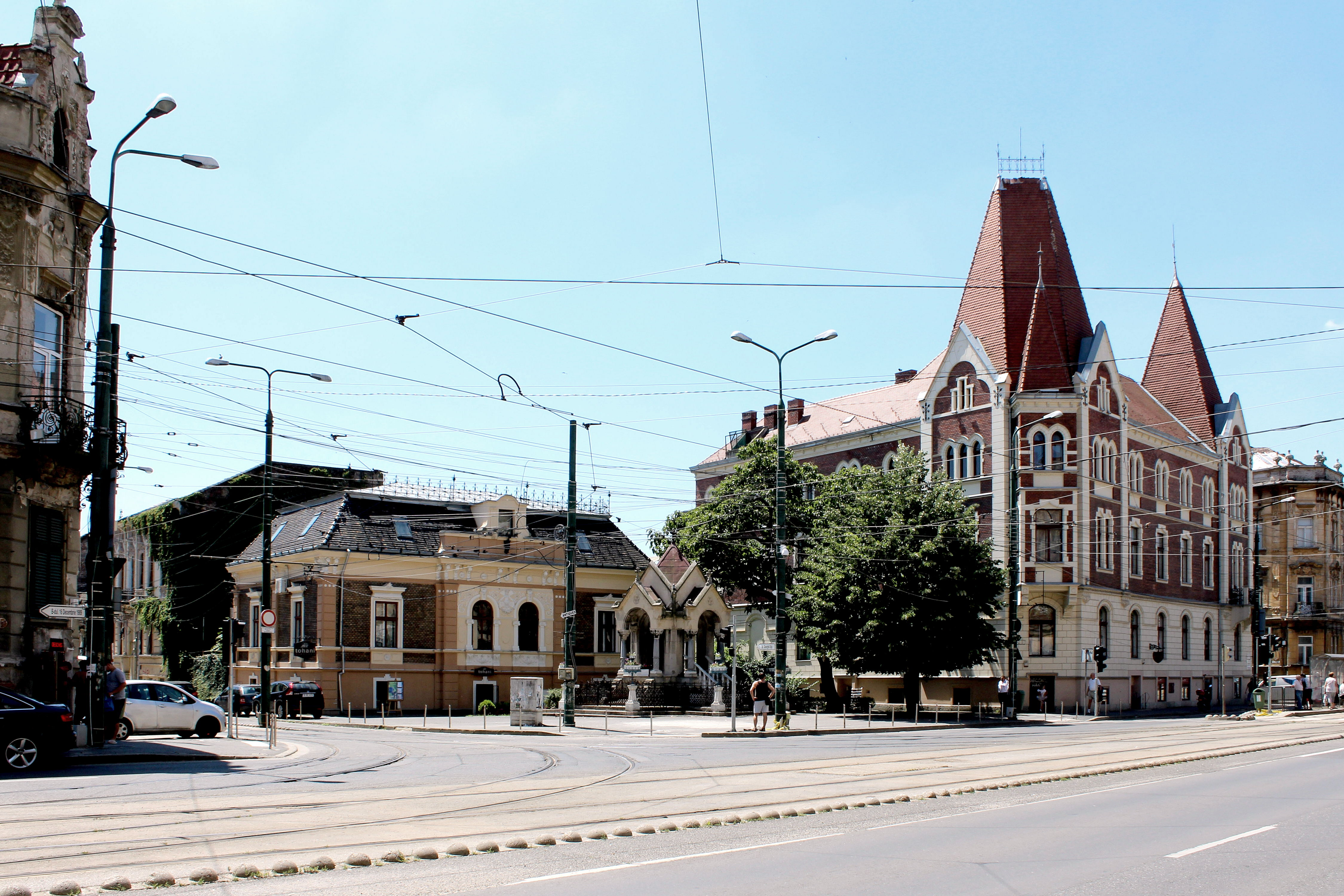
- Length: 184.58 m
- Owner: Timișoara City Hall
- Location: Timișoara, Romania
- Interactive map of St. Mary Square
- Coordinates: 45°44′54″N 21°13′8″E

St. Mary Square (Romanian: Piața Sfânta Maria) is a small square in Timișoara, located in the Iosefin district, at the intersection of 16 December 1989 Boulevard (former Carol I Boulevard) and Gheorghe Doja Street (former General Gheorghe Domășnean Street). It is part of the urban site Old Iosefin, classified as a historic monument. According to local tradition, Gheorghe Doja, the leader of the peasant uprising of 1514, was martyred here. Also here took place the first anti-communist demonstrations in Timișoara in 1989, demonstrations that would ignite the Romanian Revolution.
