= General Ion Dragalina Boulevard =

Boulevard in Romania

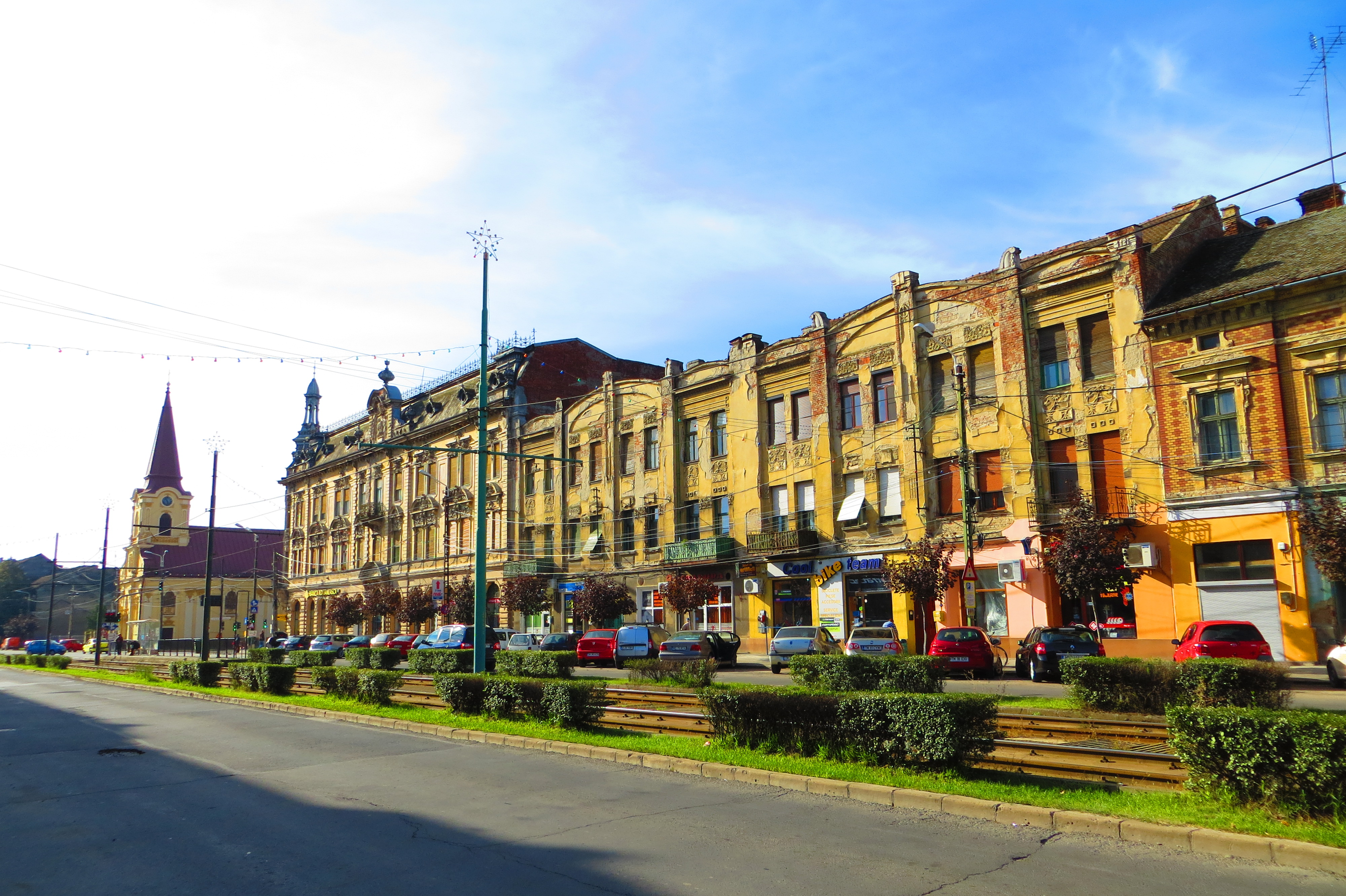
- Native name: Bulevardul General Ion Dragalina (Romanian)
- Former name(s): Úri utca, Bonnaz utca, 13 December Boulevard
- Maintained by: Timișoara City Hall
- Length: 922.21 m (3,025.6 ft)
- Location: Iosefin, Timișoara, Romania
- Coordinates: 45°44′46″N 21°12′38″E
- From: Timișoara North railway station
- To: Constantin Brâncoveanu Boulevard

General Ion Dragalina Boulevard (Romanian: Bulevardul General Ion Dragalina; formerly Úri utca to the north of Bega, Bonnaz utca to the south, named after Bishop Sándor Bonnaz of Cenad) is a boulevard in Timișoara, Romania. It starts at the Timișoara North railway station, at the junction of Station Street and Republic Boulevard, crosses the Bega Canal on the General Ion Dragalina Bridge, and runs to 16 December 1989 Boulevard. In the Elisabetin district, it continues as Constantin Brâncoveanu Boulevard. The boulevard is named in honor of Romanian World War I general Ion Dragalina.

== Monuments ==
An urban site, including most of the buildings on the street, one building, and one statue are listed in the Romanian Monuments Register.

Number	Image	Name	Construction date	Monument code
		Old Iosefin urban site 4. Notre Dame Church; 16. Károly Kós birthplace 24, 25, 25A. Anchor Palace; 27. Weisz Palace (former Royal Hotel); 29. Gemeinhardt Palace	19th–20th centuries	TM-II-s-B-06098
13		Church of the Nativity of the Virgin Mary	1774	TM-II-mA-06132
13		Statue of Saint John of Nepomuk	1722	TM-III-mA-06306

== Transport ==
The boulevard follows the routes of tram lines 1, 8, and 9, all of which terminate at Gara de Nord.
