= Gemeinhardt Palace =

- Palatul Gemeinhardt
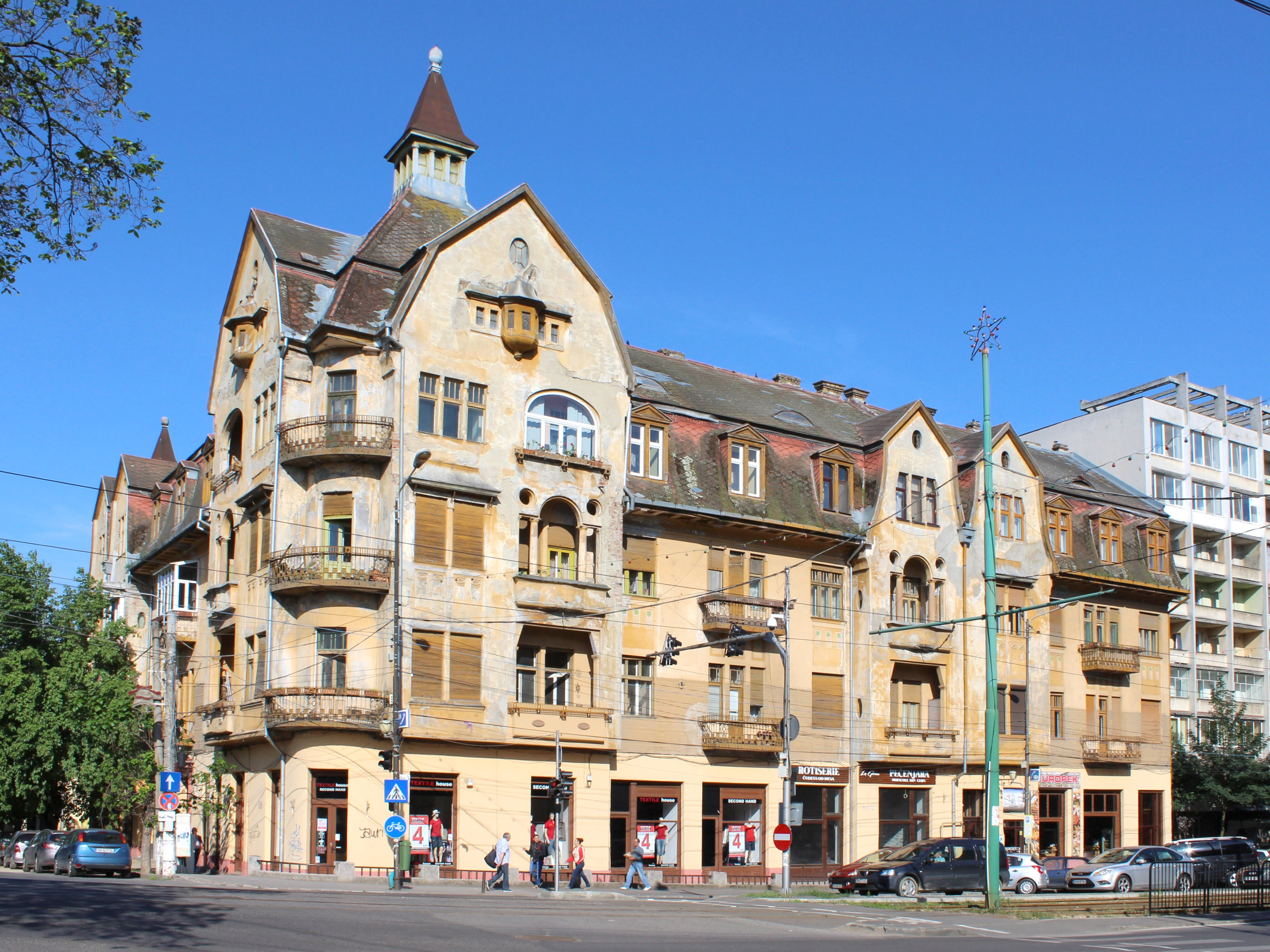
- Interactive map of the Gemeinhardt Palace area

General information
- Architectural style: Art Nouveau/Secession
- Location: 29 General Ion Dragalina Boulevard, Timișoara, Romania
- Coordinates: 45°44′51″N 21°12′31″E
- Construction started: 1911
- Completed: 1912

Technical details
- Floor count: 4

Design and construction
- Architect: Martin Gemeinhardt

The Gemeinhardt Palace (Romanian: Palatul Gemeinhardt) is a historical building in Timișoara, Romania. It is located in the Iosefin district, on the corner of General Ion Dragalina Boulevard and Nicolae Titulescu Embankment, which runs along the Bega Canal. It is designated as a protected monument within the historic Iosefin district and is registered in the Romanian list of monuments under the code TM-II-sB-06098.

== History ==
Constructed between 1911 and 1912 based on the designs of Martin Gemeinhardt, who was also the owner, the building reflects the architectural style of the early 1900s while incorporating elements of the modern architecture that emerged after World War I. A small tower highlights its corner. The arch of the second-floor loggia, supported by two columns, evokes the Renaissance architect Sebastiano Serlio, while the smaller openings on either side, featuring horizontal closures, reflect the style of Andrea Palladio—a style frequently adopted by postmodern architects as well.

During the interwar period, the Splendid Hotel operated within the palace, whose owner was the same Martin Gemeinhardt.
