= Splaiul Tudor Vladimirescu =

Street in Timișoara, Romania

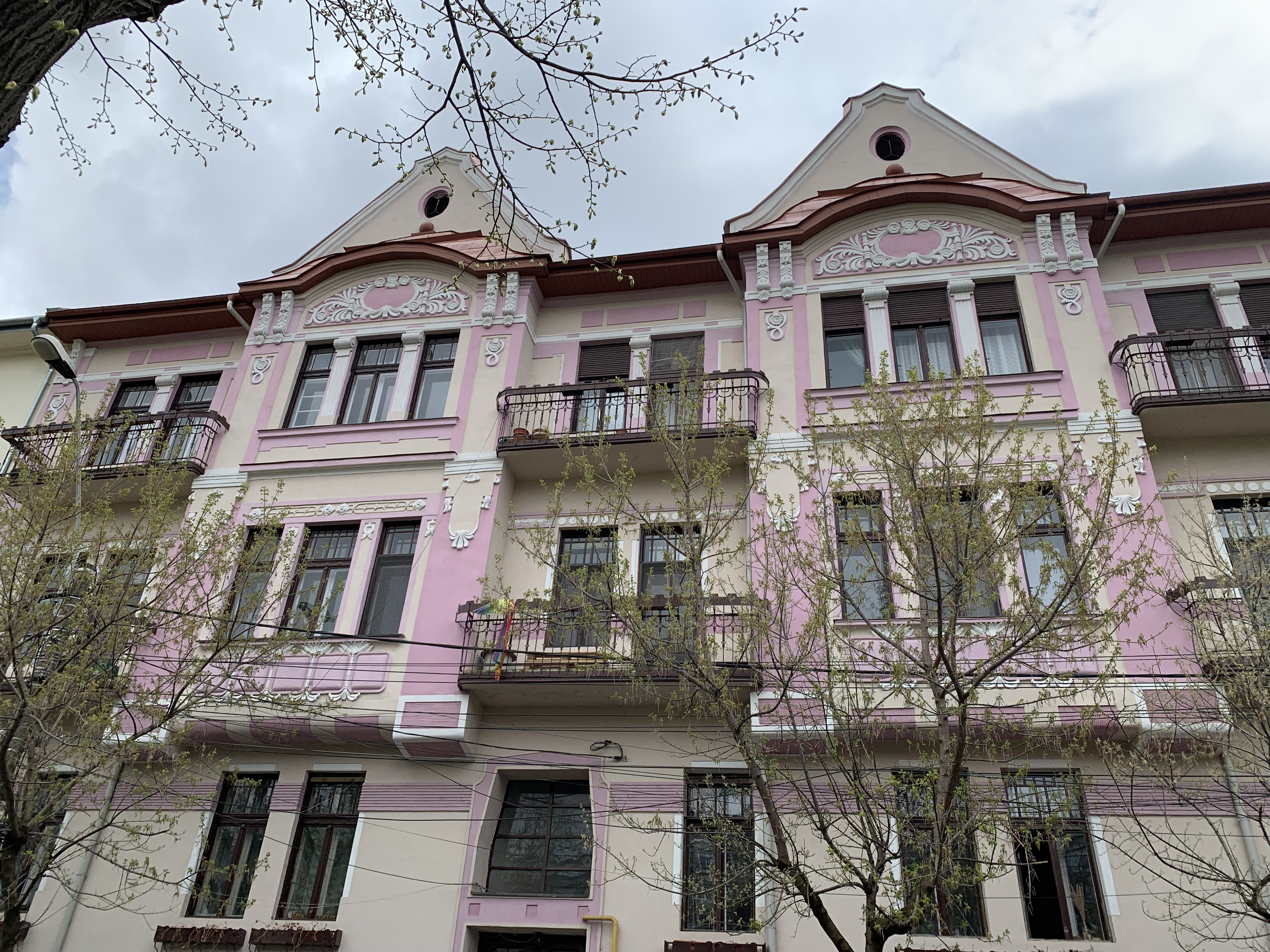
- Schnürer and Hanecker palaces on Splaiul Tudor Vladimirescu
- Interactive map of Splaiul Tudor Vladimirescu
- Former name: Bégabalsor
- Maintained by: Timișoara City Hall
- Length: 3,290.64 m (10,796.1 ft)
- Location: Timișoara, Romania
- Coordinates: 45.748791°N 21.221745°E
- From: Michael the Brave Bridge
- To: Splaiul Sofocle

Splaiul Tudor Vladimirescu (known as Bégabalsor during the Austro-Hungarian administration) is a street along the left bank of the Bega Canal in the Iosefin district of the western Romanian city of Timișoara. Its counterpart on the right bank is Splaiul Nicolae Titulescu. It was named after Tudor Vladimirescu, a prominent figure in Romanian history who led the Wallachian uprising of 1821.

It starts at the junction of Michael the Brave Boulevard (formerly Püspök út) and Michael the Brave Bridge (Püspök híd), crosses 16 December 1989 Boulevard (Hunyadi út) at the Mary Bridge (Hunyadi híd), and runs to Rahovei Street. It continues in Elisabetin as Vasile Pârvan Boulevard.

The German Consulate has been operating at number 9, in the Flavia Palace, since 2003.

== Monuments ==
An urban site from the street, which includes most of the buildings on the street, is included in the Romanian Register of Monuments.

No.	Image	Name	Construction date	Monument code
		Old Iosefin urban site 6. Alajos House; 8. Bellái House; 9. Bécsi Palace; 10. Flavia Palace; 11. Reiter House; 12. Marschall Palace; 14. Water Palace; 22–24. Szengház-type houses	19th–20th centuries	TM-II-sB-06098
