= Republic Boulevard =

Boulevard in Timișoara, Romania

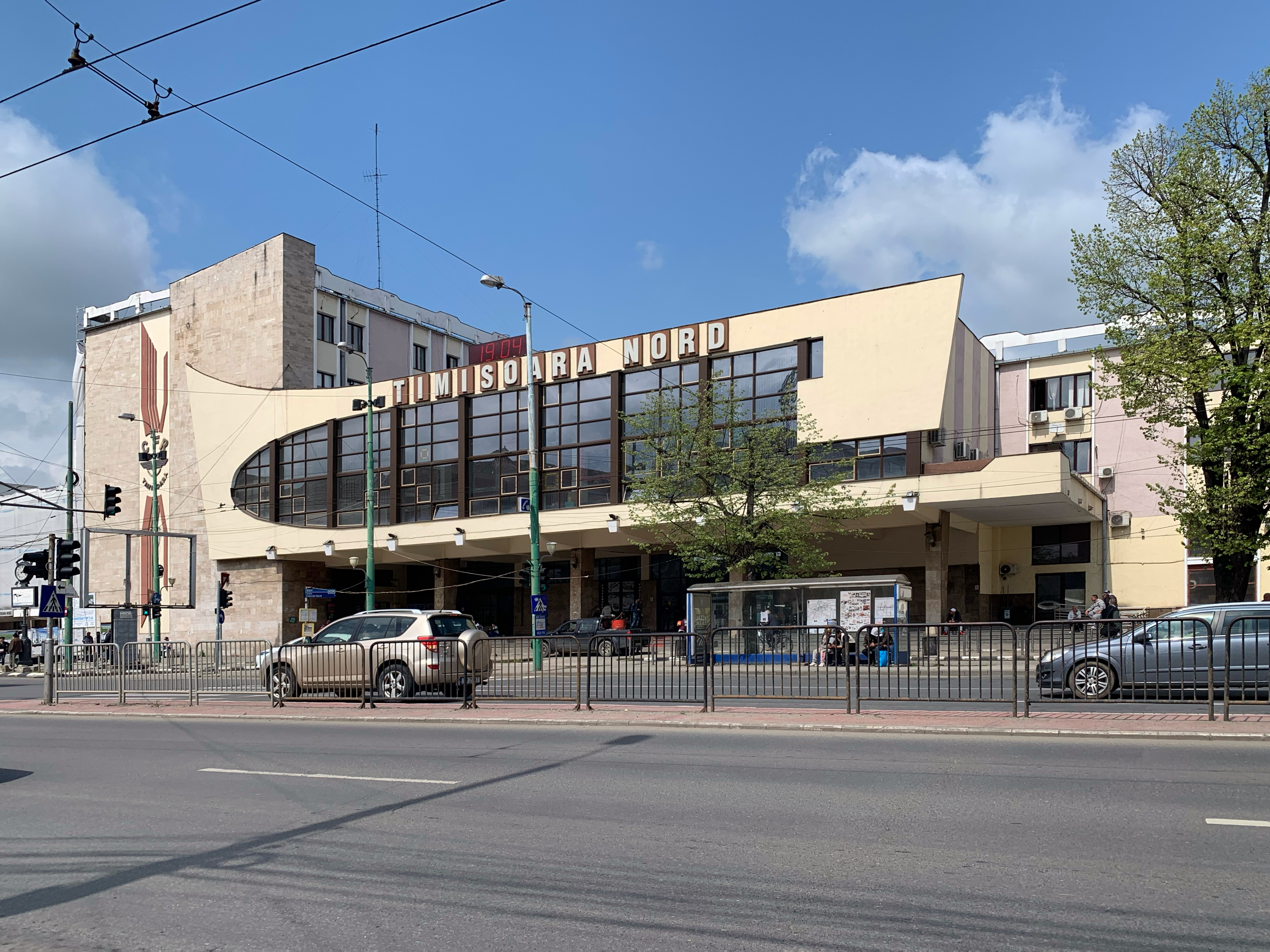
- Republic Boulevard in front of the North Station
- Native name: Bulevardul Republicii (Romanian)
- Maintained by: Timișoara City Hall
- Location: Cetate–Gară, Timișoara, Romania
- Coordinates: 45.7511384°N 21.2122057°E
- From: Timișoara North railway station
- To: Queen Marie Square

Republic Boulevard (Romanian: Bulevardul Republicii) is a boulevard in Timișoara, Romania. Republic Boulevard took shape after the demolition of Timișoara's fortress walls and gates, including the Peterwardein Gate (Hungarian: Pétervárad kapu). As advancements in artillery rendered such fortifications obsolete, the city began systematically dismantling them in the mid-19th century. During the Austro-Hungarian administration, the newly developed thoroughfare was named Börze út or Tőzsde út, meaning "Stock Exchange Street." Before 2019, the entire stretch from Timișoara North railway station to Mărăști Square was known as Republic Boulevard. Following a renaming in 2019, the portion between Queen Marie Square and Mărăști Square became King Michael I Boulevard.

Republic Boulevard traverses the site of the former industrial area surrounding the North Station, which has since been transformed into mixed-use developments like Bega Business Center, Paltim, and City of Mara. As the boulevard approaches the historic center, Central Park lies to the right, featuring the Alley of Personalities.

== Transport ==
The boulevard is served by bus lines 46, E1, E3, E4b, and M36, as well as trolleybus lines 11, 14, M11, and M14. In the past, there were plans to build a tram line along the boulevard, stretching from the North Station to the Children's Hospital, effectively doubling the existing line 1, but these plans were never realized.
