= Port of Timișoara =

Commercial port on the Bega Canal

The Port of Timișoara is a commercial port located on the Bega Canal and, of Romania's 30 inland ports, is the only one not located on the Danube.

== History ==
The Port of Timișoara dates back to 1860. The port headquarters were located in the Iosefin district, on the left bank of Bega, on the section between the Labor Bridge and the Gelu Walkway. The shore offered 450 m (1,480 ft) of space where barges could be moored. On the right bank, in the middle of this section, sits the Iosefin Water Tower. At the time, the amount of goods transported on Bega was 20,000 tons.

A harbormaster was added in 1928. The harbormaster's building was located on the site where the Anchor Palace is today. It managed the activity in the city's port and controlled the Port of Otelec, which, through the Bega Canal, provided a connection between Bega and Regensburg. This connection facilitated the transport of agricultural products from Banat to Vienna via the Rhine, as well as the Adriatic coast. Access to the Rhine meant access to the North Sea, which ensured a thriving trade.

Before World War II, the volume of goods transported on the Bega Canal was 250,000 tons/year, with a reduced fleet of ships and in conditions where the loading-unloading operations were done manually by the dockers, without mechanized means. In 1944, a peak of 50,000 passengers was recorded, but at the same time the volume of transported goods decreased. After World War II, navigation on the Bega was significantly reduced and, gradually, the transport of goods on the canal was abandoned. In 1960 it was completely discontinued and seven years later passenger ships were also withdrawn from circulation.

Between 2017 and 2022, the Bega Canal and the related hydrotechnical systems were unclogged, rehabilitated and modernized as part of a Romania–Serbia cross-border project with European funds that aimed to reopen commercial navigation both in Timișoara and towards Serbia and further towards the Danube, on the Danube–Main–Rhine relation. The Port of Timișoara was re-established by decision of the local council in 2020. Water transport to Serbia resumed in 2023, with the first Serbian boats docked in Timișoara in September. There are also plans for building two ports in Timișoara, one around the old port in the Iosefin district and one around the Michael the Brave Bridge.
