= Splaiul Nicolae Titulescu =

Street in Timișoara, Romania

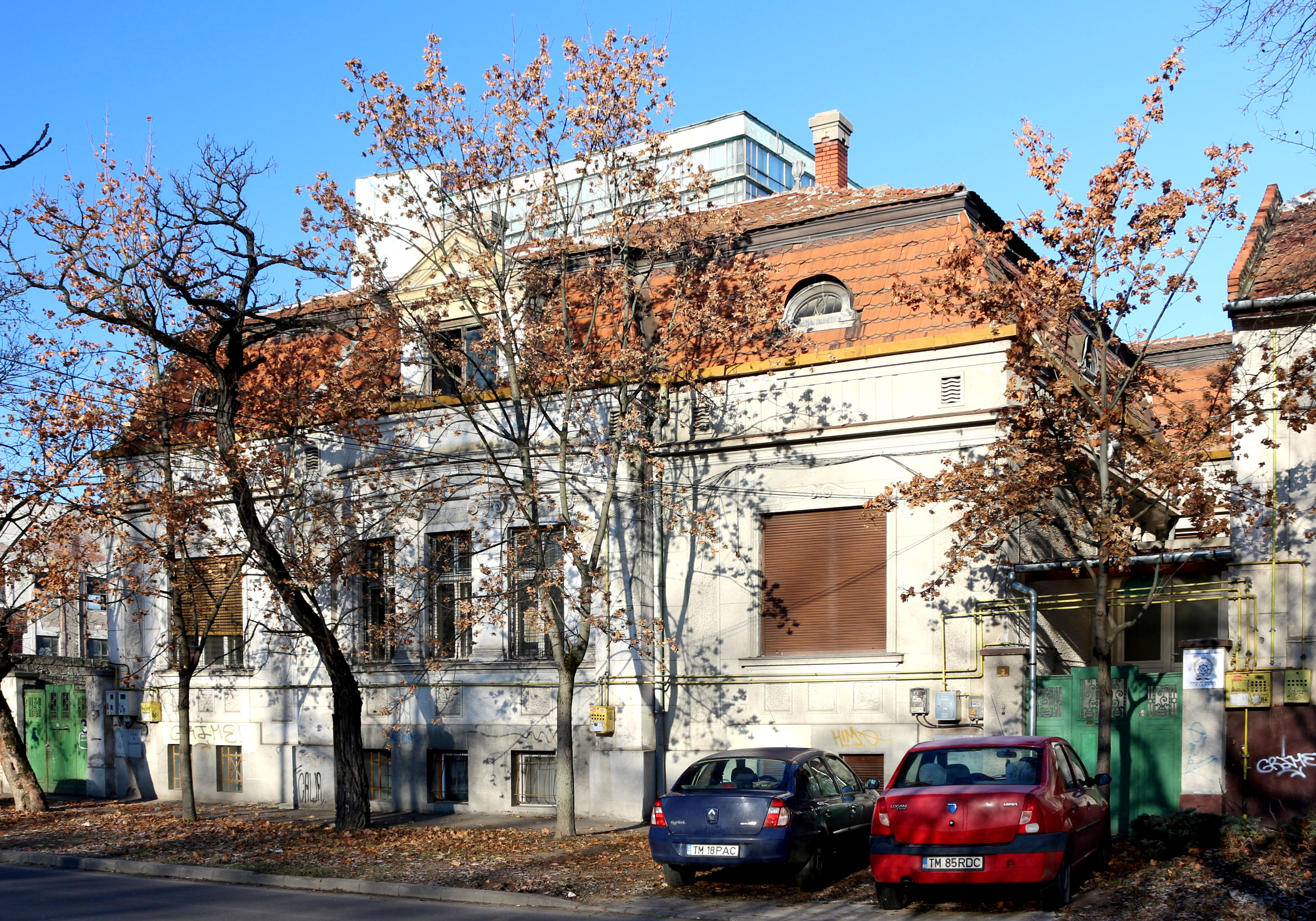
- A historical house on Splaiul Nicolae Titulescu
- Interactive map of Splaiul Nicolae Titulescu
- Former names: Bégajobbsor, Adam Müller-Guttenbrunn
- Maintained by: Timișoara City Hall
- Length: 3,447.49 m (11,310.7 ft)
- Location: Timișoara, Romania
- Coordinates: 45.750122°N 21.216472°E
- From: Modoș Bridge
- To: Mary Bridge

Splaiul Nicolae Titulescu is a street along the right bank of the Bega Canal in the Iosefin district of the western Romanian city of Timișoara. Its counterpart on the left bank is Splaiul Tudor Vladimirescu. The area was once part of the former esplanade of the Timișoara Fortress, designated as a non ædificandi zone where construction was prohibited. However, since the fortress's fortifications did not extend into this section, building work could begin as soon as the city was defortified in 1892, even before the actual demolition of the fortifications. During the Austro-Hungarian administration, it was known as Bégajobbsor, and for a brief period, it bore the name of the Swabian writer Adam Müller-Guttenbrunn.

Along Splaiul Nicolae Titulescu lies an urban ensemble designated as a historical monument, comprising family homes (at numbers 1–3), apartment buildings (formerly tenement houses, at numbers 6–7), the former Ice and Siphon Factory (at number 4), and the administrative building of the former Paltim Hat Factory (at number 5).
