= Constantin Brâncoveanu Boulevard =

Thoroughfare in Timișoara, Romania

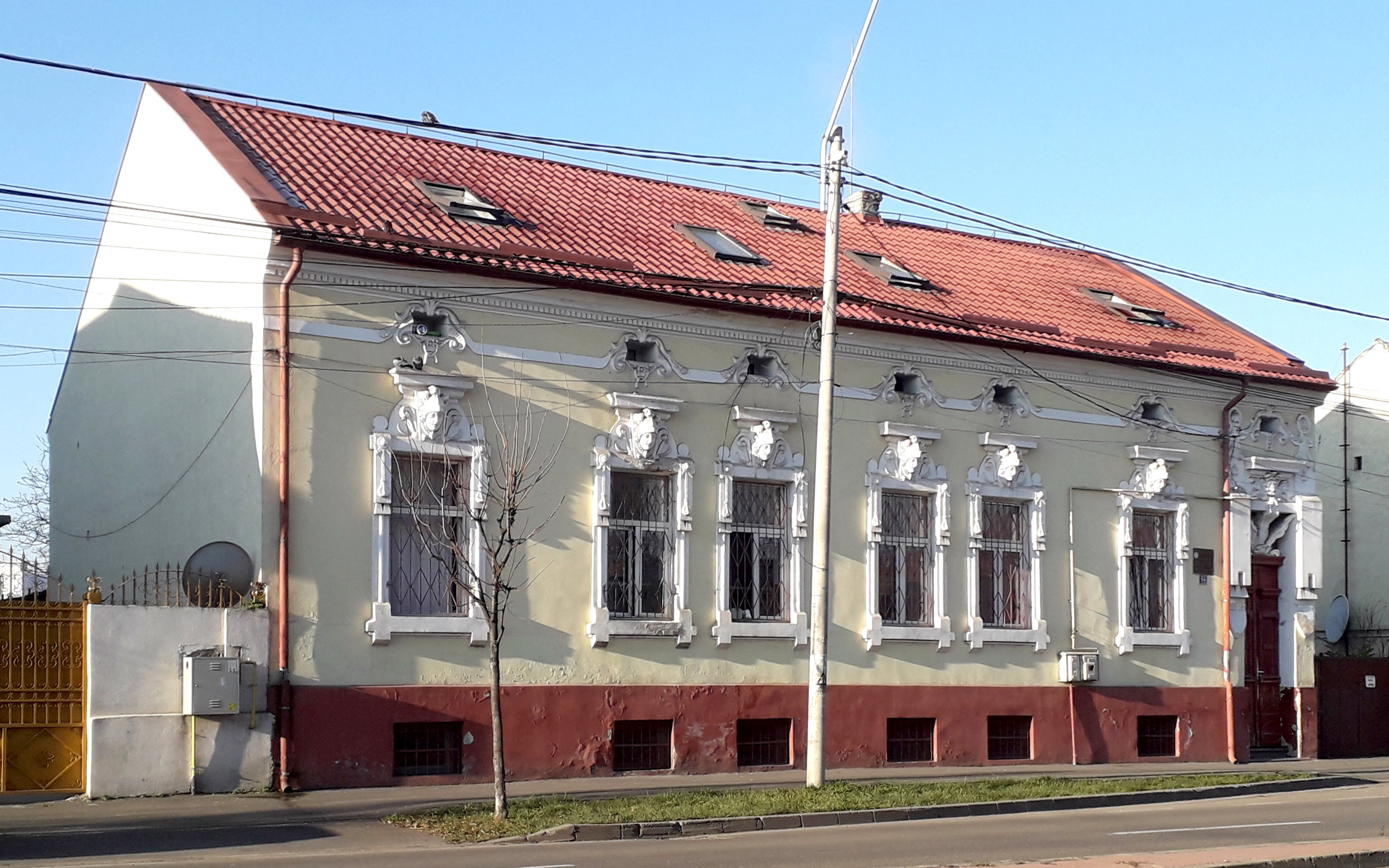
- Example of Art Nouveau architecture along Constantin Brâncoveanu Boulevard
- Native name: Bulevardul Constantin Brâncoveanu (Romanian)
- Former name(s): Helvét utca
- Maintained by: Timișoara City Hall
- Length: 1,958.46 m (6,425.4 ft)
- Location: Elisabetin, Timișoara, Romania
- Coordinates: 45.7392361°N 21.2156148°E
- From: 16 December 1989 Boulevard
- To: Liviu Rebreanu Boulevard

Constantin Brâncoveanu Boulevard (Romanian: Bulevardul Constantin Brâncoveanu) is a major thoroughfare in the Elisabetin district of Timișoara, Romania, extending between 16 December 1989 Boulevard and Liviu Rebreanu Boulevard, and intersecting streets such as Ciprian Porumbescu and Glad. It is known for its high concentration of boutiques, bazaars, market stalls, and street vendors—primarily operated by members of the Arab and Roma communities—which led to its local nickname, the "Gaza Strip."

== History ==
During Austro-Hungarian rule, this street was known as Helvét utca ("Swiss Street" in Hungarian), positioning it within the Elisabetin (Erzsébetváros) district. Postcards and period maps reference Helvét utca under that name. The street layout and development around Helvét utca emerged alongside late 19th and early 20th-century expansion as Timișoara grew beyond its former fortress limits, especially in Elisabetin.

Following World War I and the 1918 integration of the Banat region into Romania, Hungarian street names—such as Helvét utca—were progressively replaced with Romanian ones. Sometime during the interwar period, Helvét utca was either renamed or incorporated into what became Bulevardul Constantin Brâncoveanu, in tribute to Prince Constantin Brâncoveanu, a notable Wallachian ruler and martyr.

After 1989, the area gained a reputation for its abundance of low-cost shops owned by Arabs, Syrians, Iraqis, Turks, Chinese, Koreans, and others. By 2008, it hosted over 800 such businesses. Over time, locals began referring to it as the "Gaza Strip."
