= 16 December 1989 Boulevard =

Boulevard in Timișoara, Romania

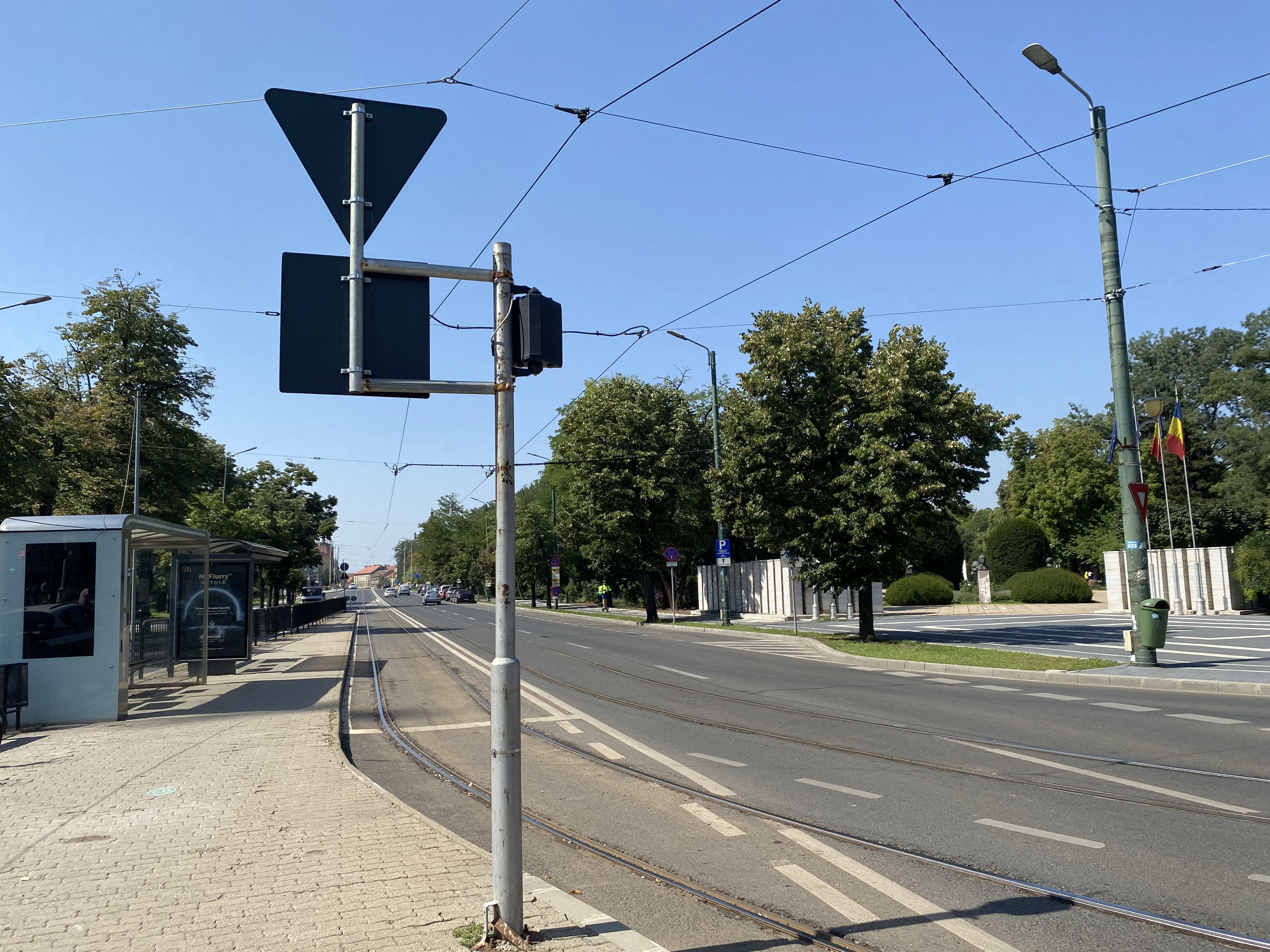
- Interactive map of 16 December 1989 Boulevard
- Native name: 16 Decembrie 1989 (Romanian)
- Former name: 6 March
- Maintained by: Timișoara City Hall
- Length: 1,379.99 m (4,527.5 ft)
- Location: Iosefin, Timișoara, Romania
- Coordinates: 45°44′53″N 21°13′6″E
- From: Metropolitan Cathedral
- To: Iuliu Maniu Square

16 December 1989 Boulevard (Romanian: Bulevardul 16 Decembrie 1989) is a boulevard in Timișoara, Romania. Towards the city center, it is connected to the Mary Bridge. This and its continuation, Calea Șagului, separate the Iosefin and Elisabetin districts.

== History ==
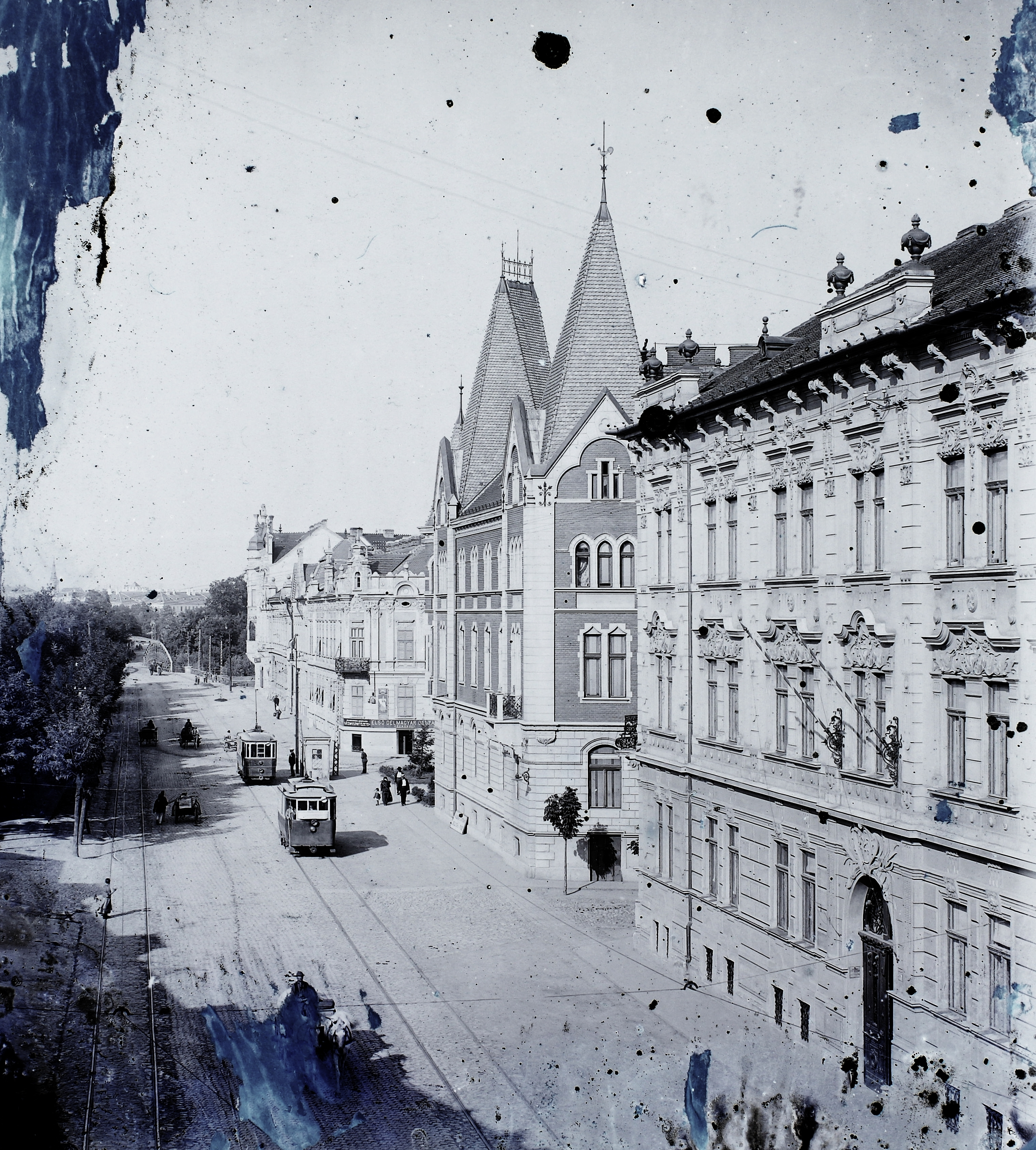
Hunyadi út in 1904

Initially serving as a main thoroughfare linking the southwestern district of the city to its center, it was named Hunyadi út, highlighting the Hungarian impact on the local governance and culture. In the early 20th century, a collection of prominent Secession-style buildings was constructed along the boulevard, showcasing the district's affluence and the influence of European architectural trends.

Following the annexation of Banat to Romania after 1918, Hungarian names were gradually replaced or supplemented with Romanian ones. The boulevard was renamed "6 March," although the local Hungarian community continued to occasionally use the name "Hunyadi."

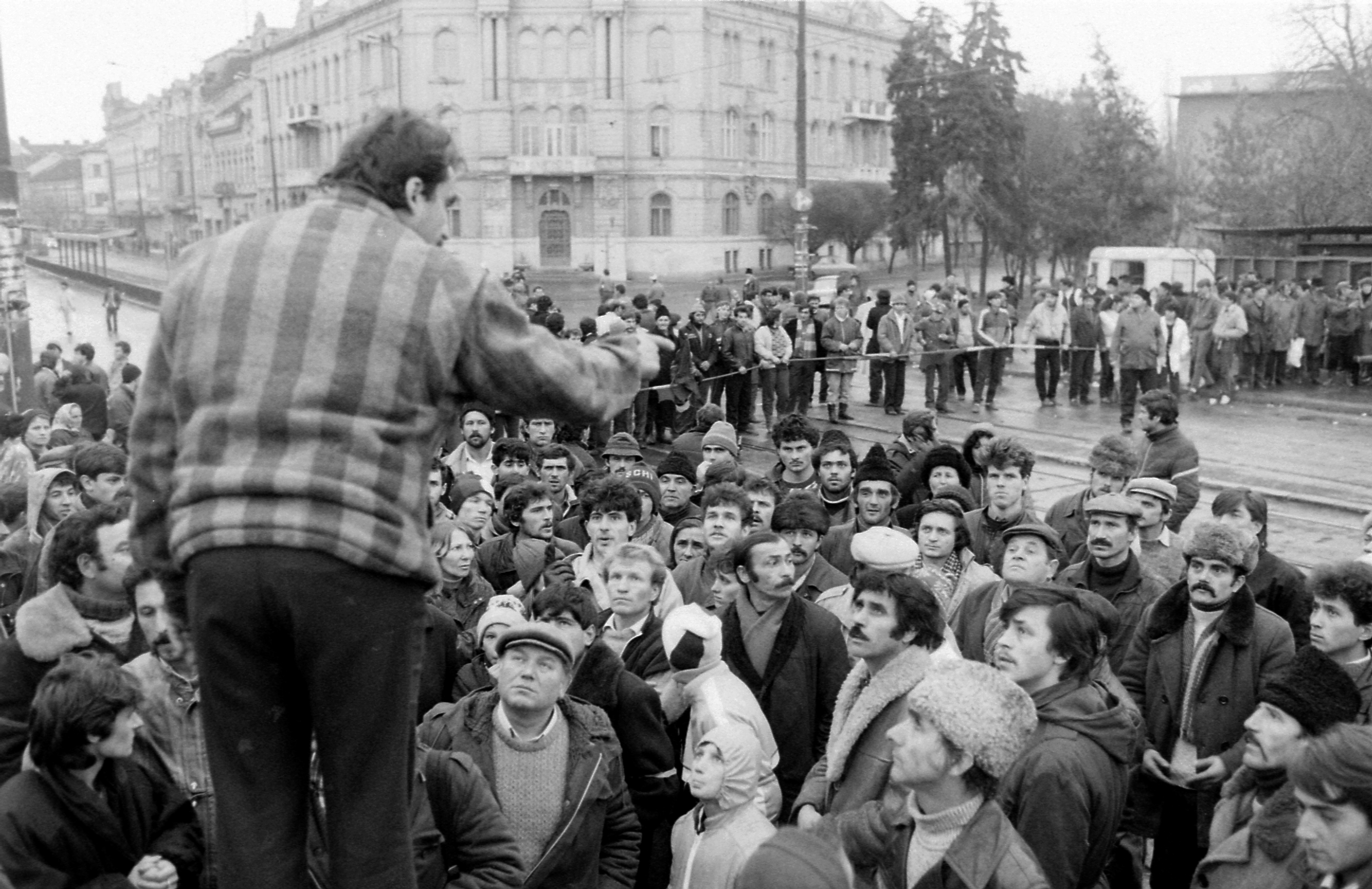
Demonstration in December 1989 at the intersection of today's 16 December 1989 Boulevard and Splaiul Tudor Vladimirescu

The boulevard holds historical significance due to its role in the 1989 Romanian Revolution, from which it derives its current name. The demonstrations started at the Elisabetin Reformed Church after authorities attempted to evict Pastor László Tőkés.

== Monuments ==
One urban site, including most of the buildings on the boulevard, and one building are listed in the National Register of Historic Monuments.

House number	Image	Name	Construction date	LMI code
		Old Iosefin urban site	19th–20th centuries	TM-II-s-B-06098
50		Iosefin Fire Station	20th century	TM-II-m-B-06117
