= Timișoara Tobacco Factory =

Factory in Timișoara, Romania

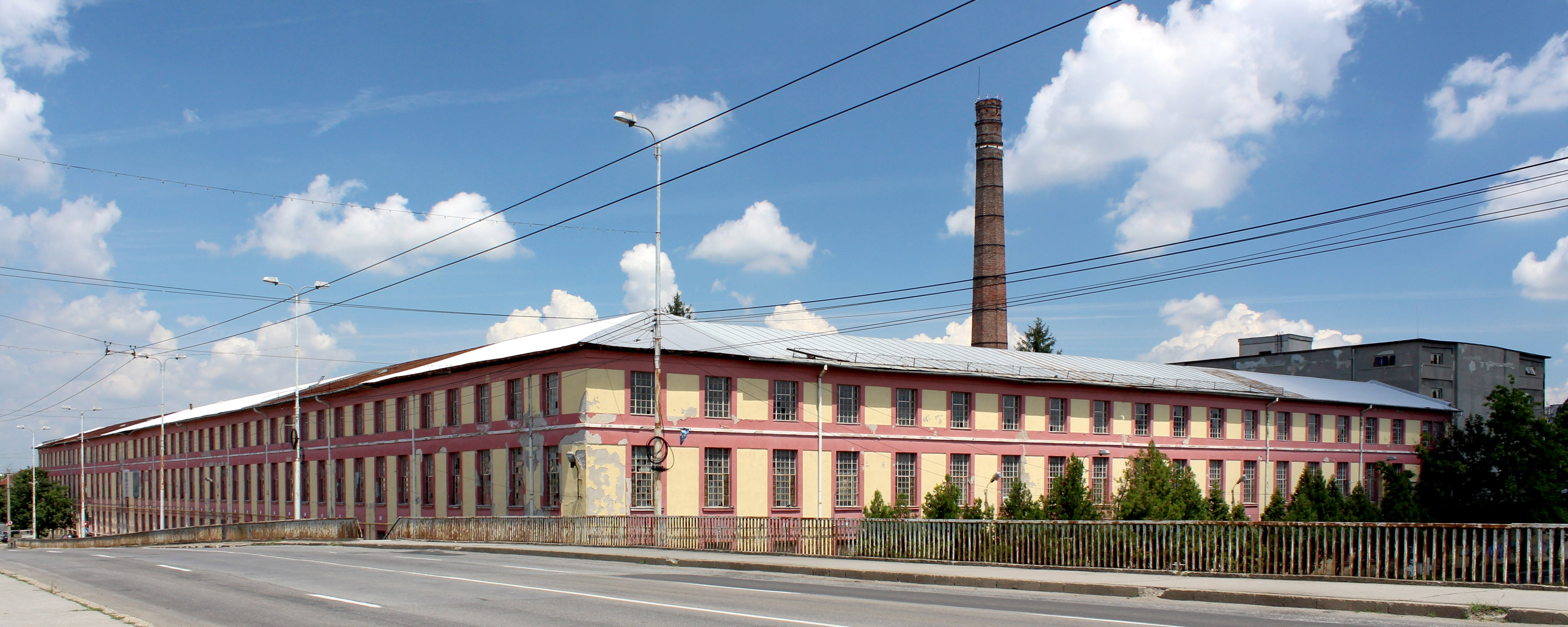
- Built: 1846
- Operated: 1846–2003
- Location: Timișoara, Romania
- Coordinates: 45°44′49″N 21°12′20″E
- Industry: Tobacco
- Products: Cigarettes
- Area: 26,380 m^{2} (284,000 sq ft)
- Owner: SC New Century Development SRL
- Defunct: 2003

The Timișoara Tobacco Factory, also known as the Iosefin Tobacco Factory (Romanian: Fabrica de tutun din Iosefin; Hungarian: Józsefvárosi dohánygyár; German: Josefstädter Tabakfabrik), was a factory for the production of tobacco products, in the western Romanian city of Timișoara. The factory building, now a listed building, is located at 2 Gheorghe Pop de Băsești Street in the Iosefin district on the right bank of the Bega River, over which the Iuliu Maniu Bridge crosses in the immediate vicinity of the factory.

It was the oldest tobacco processing enterprise in Hungary and in the current territory of Romania. It was the second largest factory in Austria-Hungary, after the one in Fiume. It operated between 1846–2003, currently being decommissioned.

== History ==
=== Before World War I ===
Joseph II promoted the cultivation of tobacco in Hungary. During the first half of the 19th century, significant areas were dedicated to tobacco farming, especially in specialized localities like Mailat and Iosif. Prior to the Hungarian Revolution of 1848, approximately 50,000 mázsák (around 2,800 tonnes) of tobacco were harvested from an area spanning 50,000 to 55,000 cadastral jugers (about 30,000 hectares).

Construction of the "Tobacco Mill" (Hungarian: Dohány Malom) began in 1846 in the Iosefin district, situated on the right bank of the Bega Canal, directly across from the Iuliu Maniu Bridge—known at the time by its Hungarian name, Király híd (Royal Bridge). By 1850, the factory covered an area of 530 square meters and employed 297 workers. Until 1851, tobacco production operated without requiring authorization and was exempt from taxation. However, on 1 March 1851, an imperial decree established a state monopoly over tobacco processing. Following the Austro-Hungarian Compromise of 1867, oversight of tobacco production in Hungary was transferred to the Ministry of Finance. To boost production, the Central Directorate of the Royal Hungarian Tobacco Excise (Hungarian: Magyar Királyi Dohányjövedéki Központi Igazgatóság) assumed management starting 1 April 1882.

In 1880, the factory was destroyed by a fire but was subsequently rebuilt. By 1890, it employed 1,875 people, of whom 1,745 were women. At times, it was the largest employer in the city. In 1911, the workforce numbered around 1,700, representing a quarter of all industrial workers in Timișoara. The factory operated its own wells to supply the substantial amount of water required for its production processes. It underwent modernization, including the installation of gas lighting from the city network and, starting in 1899, central heating in all rooms. Over time, the facility expanded; on 28 July 1901, authorization was granted to add two additional floors. Its design reflected the typical industrial architecture of the early 20th century. By the onset of World War I, the factory had reached its current size, covering an area of 26,380 square meters.

Initially, the company produced pipe tobacco, and later expanded to include cigarettes—which, at the time, referred to cigars. Over time, the introduction of quality standards and a reward system led to improvements in product quality. Starting in 1871, cigarette production began, initially using tobacco imported from Turkey. With the advent of mechanization, tobacco production grew significantly, reaching nearly 2,800 tons by 1909. This included approximately 1,300 tons of fine pipe tobacco, 1,000 tons of regular pipe tobacco, 117 tons of cigars, and 350 tons of cigarettes. Among the cigars produced, the most notable brands were Regalia, Regalia Media, Portorico Especial, Cuba, and Britanica.

=== After World War I ===
Following World War I, a shift in administration and the transfer of the factory to the State Monopolies Administration (RMS) disrupted operations. By 1920, production had dropped to just 780 tons, a decline also driven by labor shortages. It wasn't until after the Great Depression that production began to recover. During this period, both product labeling and the assortment of goods underwent changes. Pipe tobacco remained in production, along with affordable cigars like Portorico, Cigarillos, and Erdély—later marketed as Ardeal. Cigarette lines included older brands like Dame and Țigarete Regale, as well as new ones such as Mărășești and Naționale, all produced under the RMS.

After World War II, the factory's activity continued, mainly based on the production of cigarettes. 12 cigarette brands were produced, including Amiral, Bucegi, Carpați, Golf, Mărășești, Naționale, and Snagov.

=== After 1989 ===
After the regime change, efforts were made to align the enterprise with international standards to keep it competitive. In the 1990s, the factory underwent renovations, and around 20 million German marks were invested in modernizing the production lines. During this period, two new cigarette brands—Millennium and Timiș—were introduced. The factory was part of the National Romanian Tobacco Company.

Despite appearing competitive in 1998, the factory needed to be undervalued in order to be privatized. To facilitate this, the ownership repeatedly changed directors in search of one willing to drastically cut annual production from 3,600 to around 1,000 tons. By the end of 2000, the factory had turned a profit of 17 billion lei and was owed 16 billion lei in receivables. However, it was no longer permitted to continue production. Debts were not pursued, and the 200 tons of non-filter cigarettes in storage—despite market demand—were not allowed to be sold.

Eventually, the factory was sold for just 50 billion lei (approximately USD 1.6 million at the time), even though its assets alone were valued at 243 billion lei. It was acquired by SC New Century Development SRL, a company controlled by Ioan Niculae, the key figure behind the privatization of the National Romanian Tobacco Company. The factory ceased operations in 2003 following the privatization, a process that resulted in financial losses for the Romanian state.

Although the privatization deal raised suspicions from the outset and workers protested for three weeks in front of the Timiș County Prefecture, no investigation was carried out. By the time such an inquiry might have occurred—after 2010—the statute of limitations had already expired. Despite promises that production would restart, it never did, leading farmers to abandon tobacco cultivation. Tobacco farming in Banat resumed only a decade later, on a much smaller scale. The new beneficiary was a Hungarian company that received subsidies intended for the cultivators, rather than the landowners or workers responsible for the rest of the process.

== Current situation ==
The building is situated in the Iosefin district, close to the city center. Following the end of its production activities, the property was repurposed for use as office space and storage by various companies. As it has been designated a historical monument, the owner is prohibited from demolishing it to exploit the land's value. Although the structure boasts ample space and sturdy walls, its facade is in poor condition, prompting authorities to mandate conservation efforts. However, on 28 January 2016, the owning company, SC New Century Development SRL, filed for insolvency.
