= Prohászka Mill =

- Moara Prohászka
- Former names: Elisabeth Mill; Bega Mill; Timișoara Mechanical Mill

General information
- Location: Timișoara, Romania
- Coordinates: 45.74874°N 21.21226°E
- Completed: 1869
- Renovated: 1909
- Owner: Tender Imobiliare

The Prohászka Mill is an industrial building in Timișoara, Romania, located on the right bank of the Bega Canal in the Iosefin district. It is the largest and the only one that still exists among the mills built during the industrial boom experienced by Iosefin at the end of the 19th century.

It was built in 1869, when the Banat Steam Mill Company was founded, but the original building was smaller than the one that still exists today. Between 1880 and 1908, it functioned as a branch of the Elisabeth Mill in Budapest, during which it was simply called Elisabeth Mill (Hungarian: Erzsébet malom; German: Elisabeth Mühle). In 1909, Ede Prohászka Jr. bought and expanded the mill, equipped it with a two-story warehouse and connected it to the Iosefin train station by a one-kilometer-long railroad track. It was in his possession until 1926.

At the beginning of the 20th century, the mill was equipped with steam and electric power of approximately 900 hp. The 25 workers of the mill processed 15 grain wagons daily. Built right on the banks of the Bega, the mill had its own pier, because water transport was cheap, and on the Bega–Tisza–Danube canal, goods reached Central Europe. In the interwar period, the mill had 300 employees and 45 functionaries. It processed more than 6,000 grain wagons (600,000 quintals of flour and other products) annually, and half of the production was exported mainly to Bosnia-Herzegovina, Germany, Holland, England, France and Switzerland, but also to the Old Kingdom and the United States.

During World War II, the mill was heavily bombed, permanently losing its western body. Around the 1960s, two blocks of flats were built on that land, which can still be seen today. The current owner of the mill is Tender Imobiliare. Today the mill is abandoned, in an advanced state of decay.
