= Iosefin Fire Station =

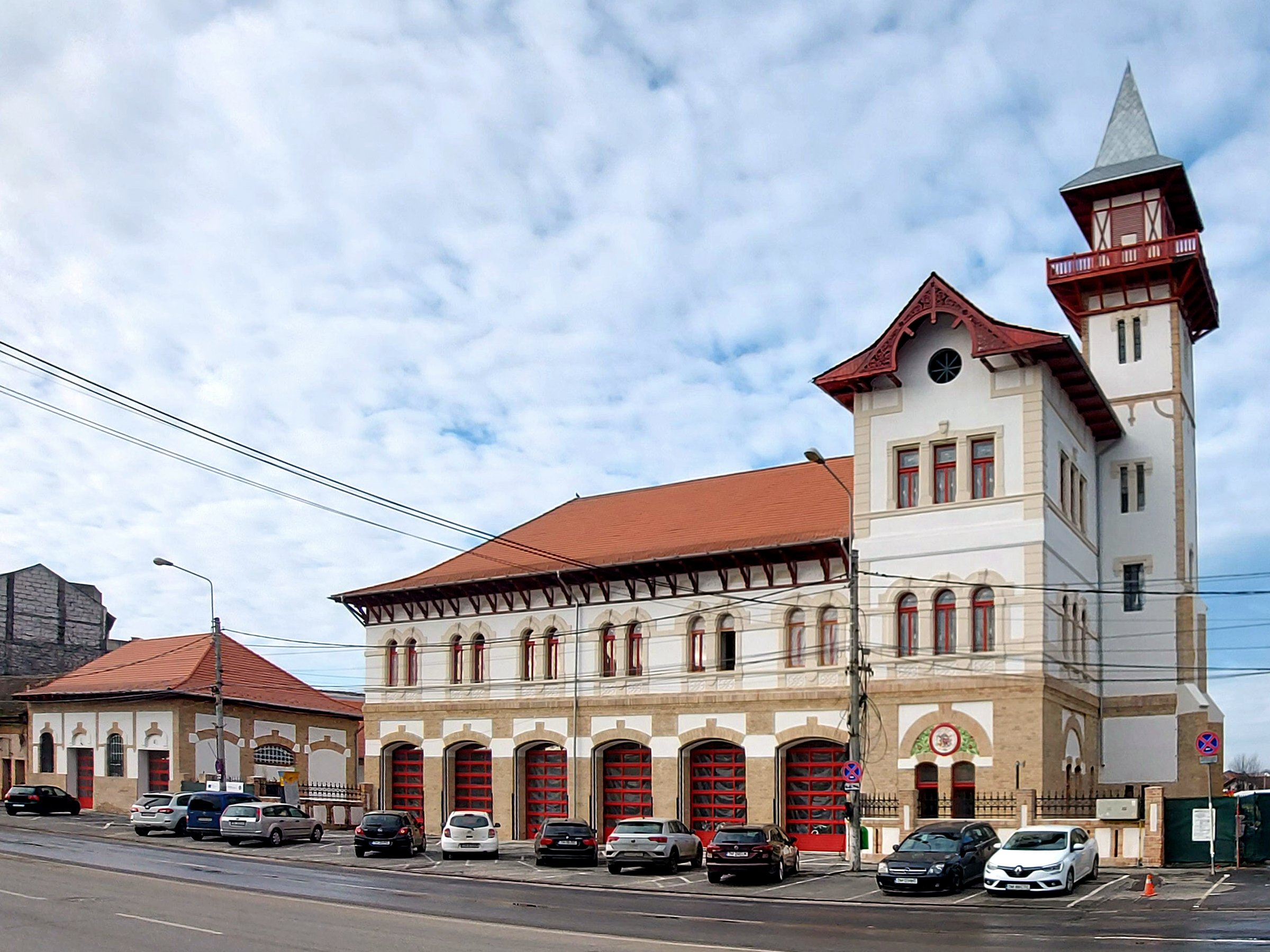
- The fire station in 2025
- Interactive map of the Iosefin Fire Station area

General information
- Type: Fire station
- Architectural style: Secession
- Location: Timișoara, Romania
- Coordinates: 45°44′26″N 21°12′37″E
- Construction started: 1905
- Inaugurated: 1906
- Cost: 84,000 kr.
- Owner: General Inspectorate for Emergency Situations

Design and construction
- Architect: László Székely

The Iosefin Fire Station is a historical monument in Timișoara, Romania, designed by Hungarian architect László Székely in the so-called "1900s style". It was built in the Iosefin district, near the old fire station, on the site of the old watchtower. It is currently the headquarters of Timișoara Fire Department 2.

== History ==
In Timișoara, the first regulations for firefighters date from 13 March 1774 and contained fire prevention instructions and provisions regarding the organization of the intervention. In 1801, the inhabitants of Timișoara are obliged by a provision of the city magistrate to respect and take all measures against fire and to repair and maintain in good condition all the wells. A document describing and explaining how to use fire extinguishers was drawn up in 1813. On 24 August 1870, the police drew up instructions prohibiting the storage of wood and straw in attics, the crossing of streets with torches, the lighting of cigarettes in the theater premises, the burning of pigs, the lighting of straw and dry grass fires and the leaving of lit candles in houses. Craftsmen's workshops had to be equipped with pumps, water barrels, ladders, buckets and hooks, and the participation of citizens in extinguishing fires was mandatory. From 1890, homes also had to be equipped with fire extinguishers (barrels, buckets, ladders, pickaxes).

On 22 August 1869, volunteer fire brigades were established in Iosefin, Elisabetin and Fabric, and in 1893 in Mehala as well. When the three corps in Fabric, Iosefin and Cetate were reorganized in 1877, they kept their own autonomy, but their activity could be better coordinated. The headquarters of the three corps had permanent guards and were linked by their own telephone lines, the corps were equipped with standardized fire extinguishers, and the training of firefighters was carried out according to the same methods. These brigades were staffed with doctors and lawyers and, apart from firefighting, they were deployed in case of demolitions or rescue of people and property.

The fire company in Iosefin had very good results, which is why in 1904 the city hall decided to build a new fire station, next to the old one. Construction began at the end of July 1905 and cost around 84,000 kroner (equivalent to 25 kg of gold). It was inaugurated on 1 June 1906. The building, still in operation today, has a main body and side bodies. On the ground floor were the carriage sheds and four horse stables. On the first floor were the commander's rooms, those for rest and the firemen's waiting room, and on the second floor, various warehouses and two large towers – a water tank for filling the cisterns and the watchtower that dominated the district and the whole western area of the city.

On 2 November 1920, the communal theater burned down, and the following day the workshop of the Tramvaiele Comunale Timișoara (Timișoara Communal Trams) company. These fires showed that the fire service was outdated. Although the city hall supplemented the volunteer fire brigades with 40 permanent and professional firefighters, however, in 1928 it was decided to abandon volunteer firefighters, and the fire brigades were to be composed exclusively of professional, properly equipped firefighters. Following approval by the Ministry of Internal Affairs, the city hall organized the Fire Service, with 80 firefighters and two officers.

In 1936, the Ministry of Internal Affairs ordered the militarization of the fire brigade in Timișoara. The Timișoara Military Fire Company was established on 1 June 1936, consisting of a captain, two junior officers, eight non-commissioned officers and 80 soldiers. The company took into use the fire stations, engines and tools that belonged to the city hall and had been used until then by the firemen of the city hall. At that time the firemen had three stations: the one in Iosefin, a station in Cetate, on the current site of Adam Müller-Guttenbrunn House, and one in Fabric, near the Greek Catholic church. Currently, these last two stations no longer exist.

Fire stations in Timișoara in the early 20th century
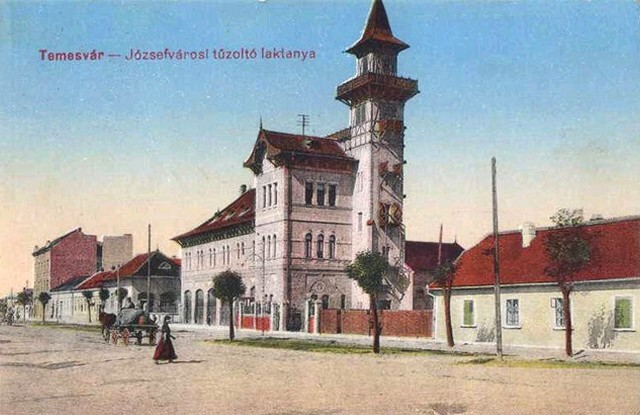
Iosefin fire station in 1912

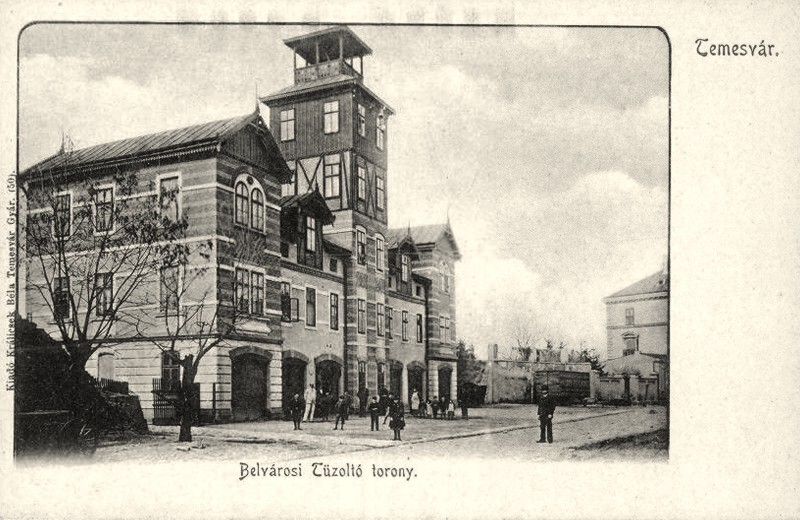
Cetate fire station in 1900

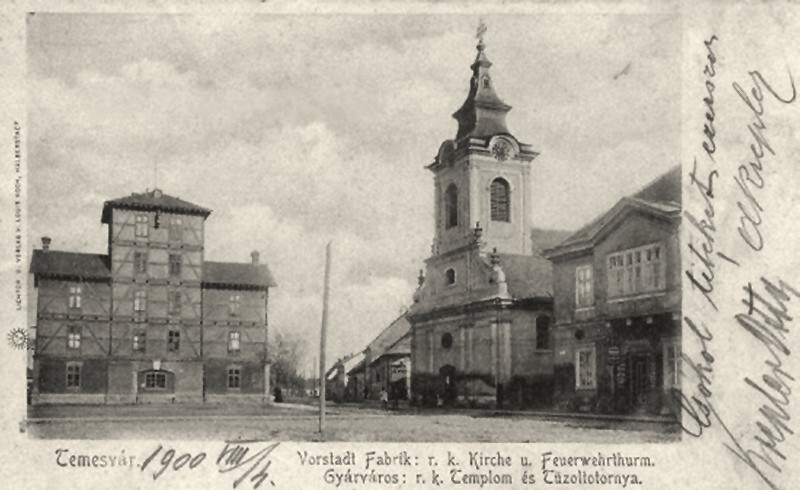
Fabric fire station (left) in 1900

After World War II, firefighters are organized in the Banat Firefighters Group, which in December 2004 merged with the Civil Protection Inspectorate, forming the Banat Emergency Situations Inspectorate. Currently, there are two fire departments in Timișoara, Timișoara Fire Department 1, based at 13 Înfrățirii Street, and Timișoara Fire Department 2, based in the Iosefin fire station.
