= Vasile Pârvan Boulevard =

Boulevard in Timișoara, Romania

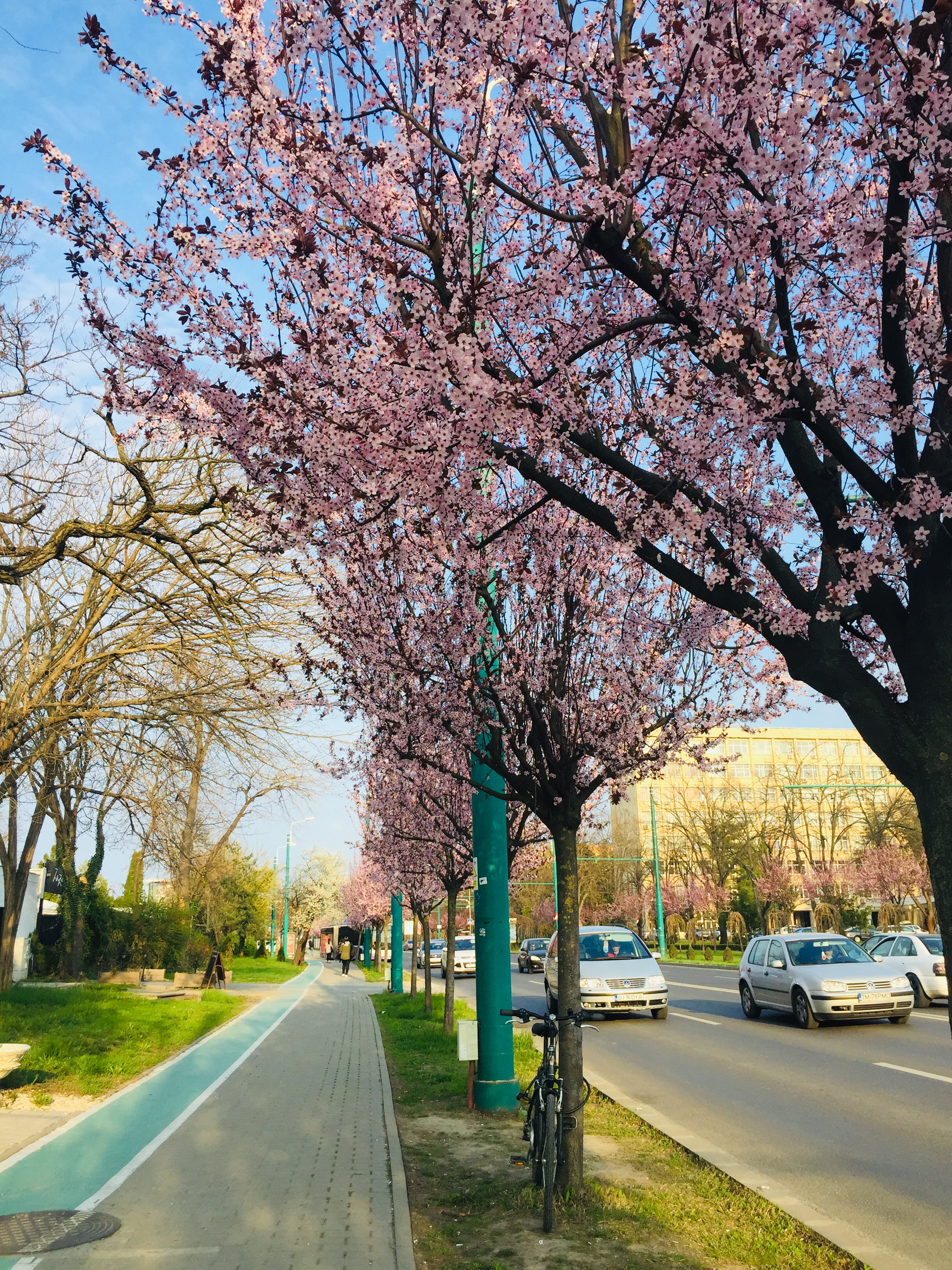
- Interactive map of Vasile Pârvan Boulevard
- Native name: Bulevardul Vasile Pârvan (Romanian)
- Former name: Leonte Filipescu
- Maintained by: Timișoara City Hall
- Length: 814.14 m (2,671.1 ft)
- Location: Timișoara, Romania
- Coordinates: 45°44′52″N 21°13′49″E
- From: Splaiul Tudor Vladimirescu
- To: Michelangelo Underpass

Vasile Pârvan Boulevard (Romanian: Bulevardul Vasile Pârvan) is a boulevard in Timișoara, Romania. It emerges east of Splaiul Tudor Vladimirescu, extending the central thoroughfare toward the Cetate (historic core) neighborhood. Its creation was part of a broader pattern of urban expansion that followed the post-fortification redevelopment of Timișoara's urban layout—similar to other boulevards like Citadel Boulevard, established on the former fortress perimeter.

It borders the campuses of the Politehnica University and the West University and is aligned with entertainment venues and sports facilities along the left bank of the Bega Canal.

In the Romanian road network, the boulevard corresponds to national road 59 and European road 70.
