= Flavia Palace =

- Palatul Flavia
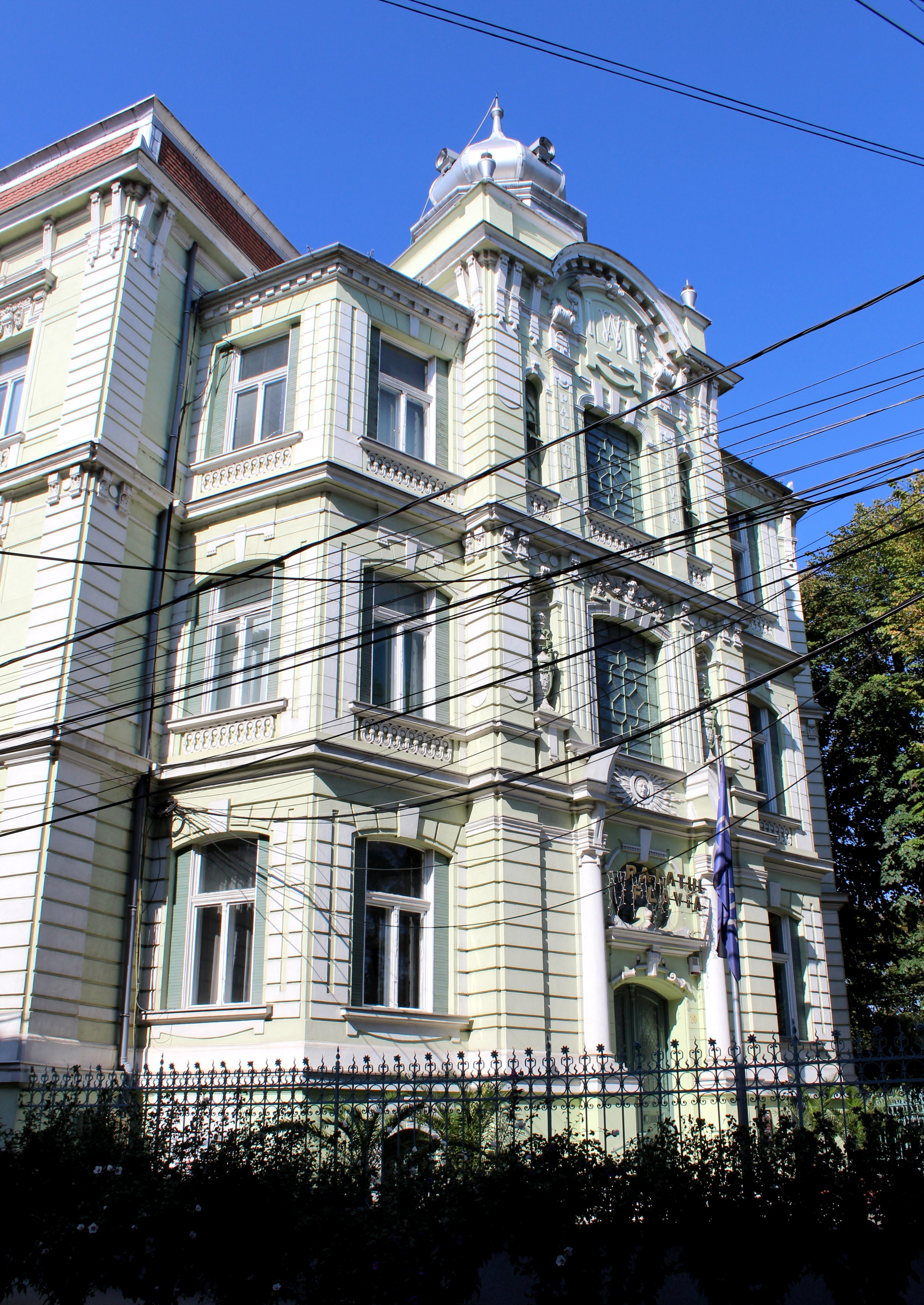
- Interactive map of the Flavia Palace area
- Alternative names: Weismayr Palace

General information
- Architectural style: Eclectic
- Location: 10 Splaiul Tudor Vladimirescu, Timișoara, Romania
- Coordinates: 45°44′55″N 21°13′16″E
- Current tenants: German Consulate
- Construction started: 1 October 1903
- Completed: 15 October 1904

Flavia Palace, also known as Weismayr Palace, is a historical building on Splaiul Tudor Vladimirescu in Timișoara, Romania. Since 2003, it has hosted the German Consulate in Timișoara, which serves the counties of Arad, Bihor, Caraș-Severin, Mehedinți, Satu Mare, and Timiș—home to approximately 31,000 of the 60,000 ethnic Germans registered in Romania.

It was built between 1903 and 1904 in eclectic style. Between the 1970s and 1989, it served as a paid polyclinic with specialist medical practices, while a medical laboratory operated on the ground floor.
