= Liviu Rebreanu Boulevard =

Boulevard of Timișoara, Romania

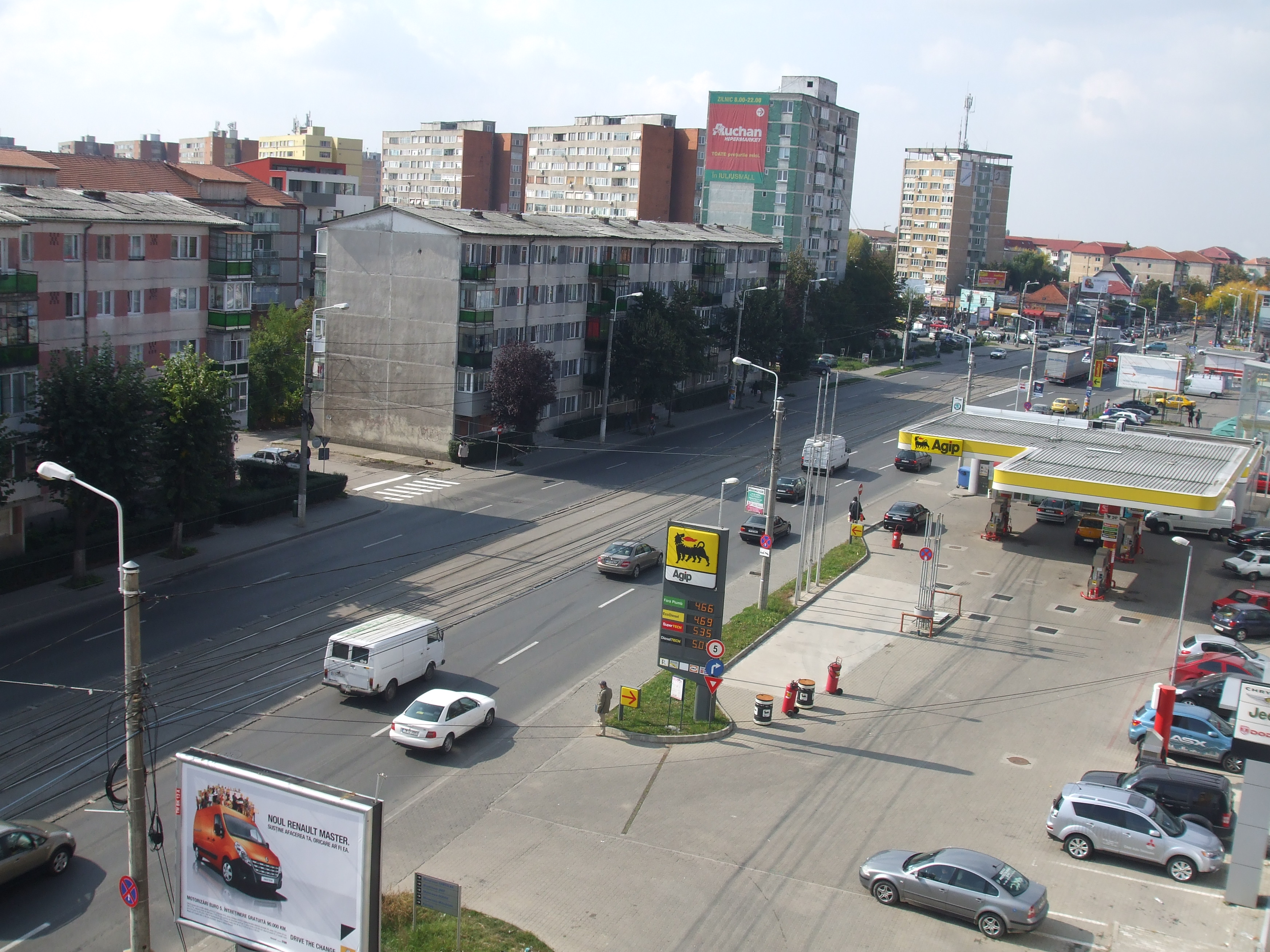
- Liviu Rebreanu Boulevard in October 2010
- Native name: Bulevardul Liviu Rebreanu (Romanian)
- Former name: Iosif Bulbuca Boulevard (1993–2014)
- Maintained by: Timișoara City Hall
- Length: 2,430.44 m (7,973.9 ft)
- Location: Timișoara, Romania
- Coordinates: 45.7385956°N 21.2386387°E
- From: Calea Șagului
- To: Gheorghe Domășnean Square

Liviu Rebreanu Boulevard (Romanian: Bulevardul Liviu Rebreanu) is the longest boulevard in the western Romanian city of Timișoara. It is also one of the busiest in the city, with an average of 13,000–14,000 cars per day. Before 2014, the section between Calea Martirilor and Calea Buziașului was known as Bulevardul Iosif Bulbuca. In 2014, local authorities reinstated the historical name Liviu Rebreanu throughout the entire stretch.

It serves as a distinct dividing line between Timișoara's historic city center to the north and the vast area of socialist-era apartment blocks constructed primarily between 1970 and 1989 to the south. Over time, the boulevard has come to represent the city's characteristic "matchbox-block" urban landscape from the communist period.
