= Water Palace =

- Palatul Apelor
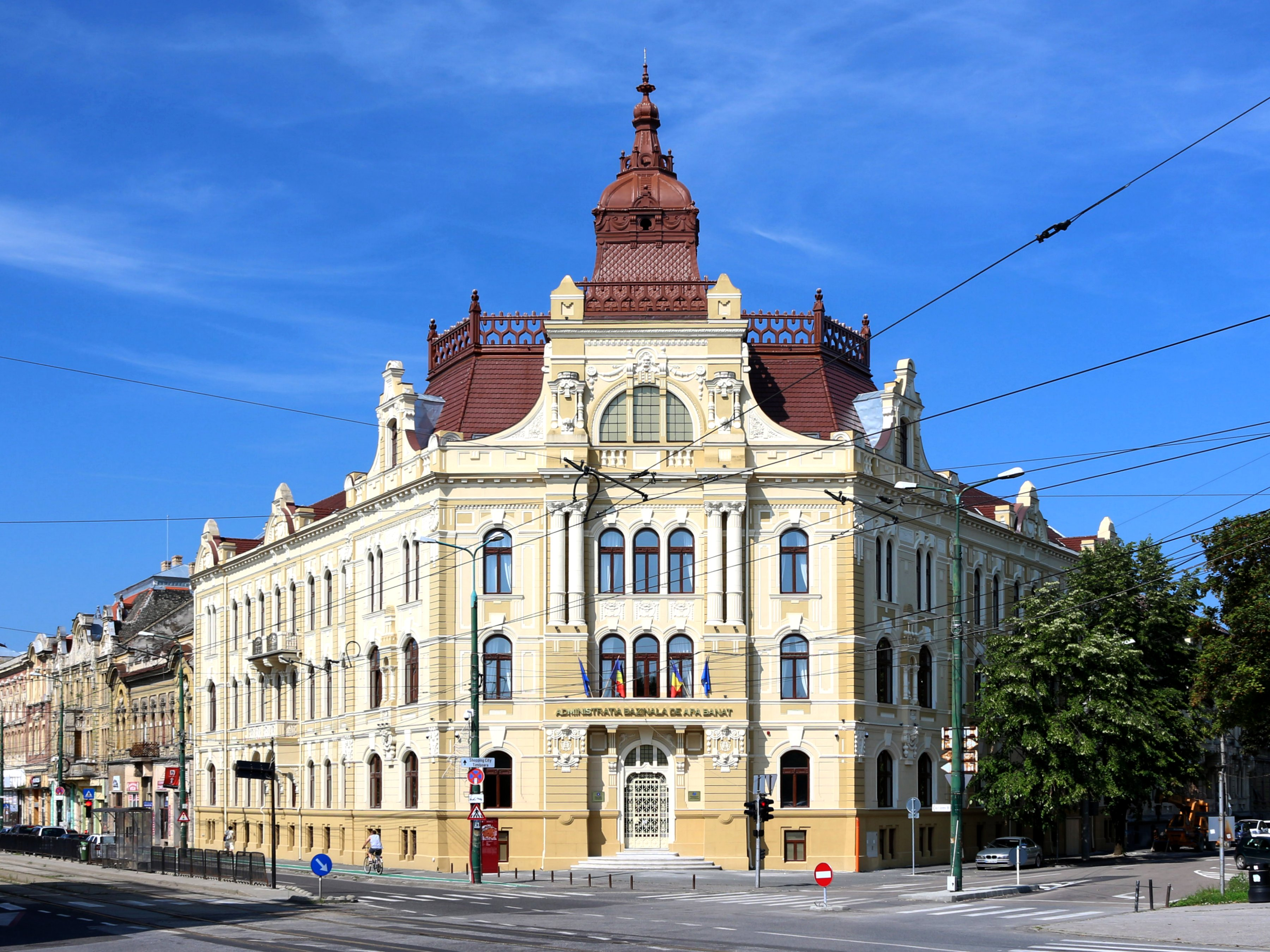
- Interactive map of the Water Palace area

General information
- Architectural style: Secession
- Location: Timișoara, Romania
- Coordinates: 45°44′57″N 21°13′9″E
- Construction started: 1900
- Completed: 1901
- Renovated: 1910, 2018
- Owner: Banat Water Basin Administration

Technical details
- Material: Brick
- Floor count: 3

Design and construction
- Architect: Lipót Baumhorn
- Engineer: Karl Hart

Renovating team
- Architects: Arthur Tunner (1910); Sorin Henț (2018)

The Water Palace (Romanian: Palatul Apelor) is a historical monument in Timișoara, Romania. It is located at the entrance from the city center to the Iosefin district. Built in 1901 for the Timiș–Bega Hydro-improvement Company, between 1948 and 2007 it also housed the Timișoara CFR Regional. It currently belongs again to the Banat Water Basin Administration.

== History ==
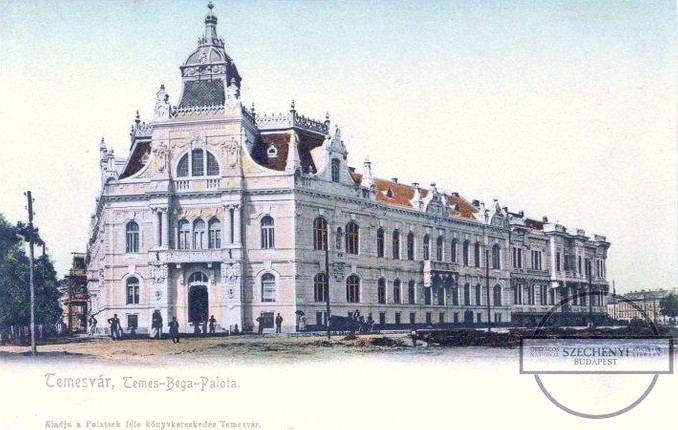
The Water Palace in 1902

Alongside the Marschall Palace, the Water Palace marks the access to the Iosefin district, crossing the Trajan Bridge from the Cetate. The palace was built for the Timiș–Bega Hydro-improvement Company, established in 1871 especially for the management of the Bega Canal, an important transport route at the time. Designed by the architect Lipót Baumhorn, work began in 1900, under the direction of Karl Hart, and was completed a year later, in 1901. The palace was originally a one-storey building, but in 1910 builder Arthur Tunner extended it by adding a second storey, retaining the overall appearance. All sectors of the company functioned in the building, and on the second floor were the studios for employees coming from outside Timișoara.

In 1923, the Police Prefecture and State Security functioned in the palace. In 1941, the Dean's Office of the Faculty of Agronomy and the Faculty of Geography of the University of Cluj, which had taken refuge here in Timișoara following the occupation of Northwest Transylvania by the Hungarian state, also functioned here. Here was the Owners' Union that dealt with all issues related to watercourses (established in 1924, following the water law), which in 1950 would change its title, remaining with the same attributions. In 1948 the palace was nationalized and assigned to the Timișoara CFR Regional. After 1989, the Romanian Waters National Administration requested the retrocession. This lasted until 2007, because the CFR Regional accused Romanian Waters of registering the property with false documents. Between 2011–2018 it was rehabilitated.

== Architecture ==
The palace, a two-storey building, has a central bay facing east and two wings of about 30 m, the southern wing being located on 16 December 1989 Boulevard, and the northern one on Tudor Vladimirescu Embankment. The central bay, where the entrance to the building is located, is elevated and dominated by a cupola tower, which is a wooden construction, currently covered with galvanized sheet that imitates the original tile. The eastern facade of the bay, with a length of about 17 m, is decorated with double columns of the Ionic order, which highlight the pediments. The whole building is very richly ornamented, with neo-baroque elements in the eclectic Secession style. The decoration was mainly done with aquatic elements and marine figures: fish, seahorses, seashells, aquatic plants and female anthropomorphic figures.
