= Paltim Hat Factory =

Plant in Timișoara

Paltim
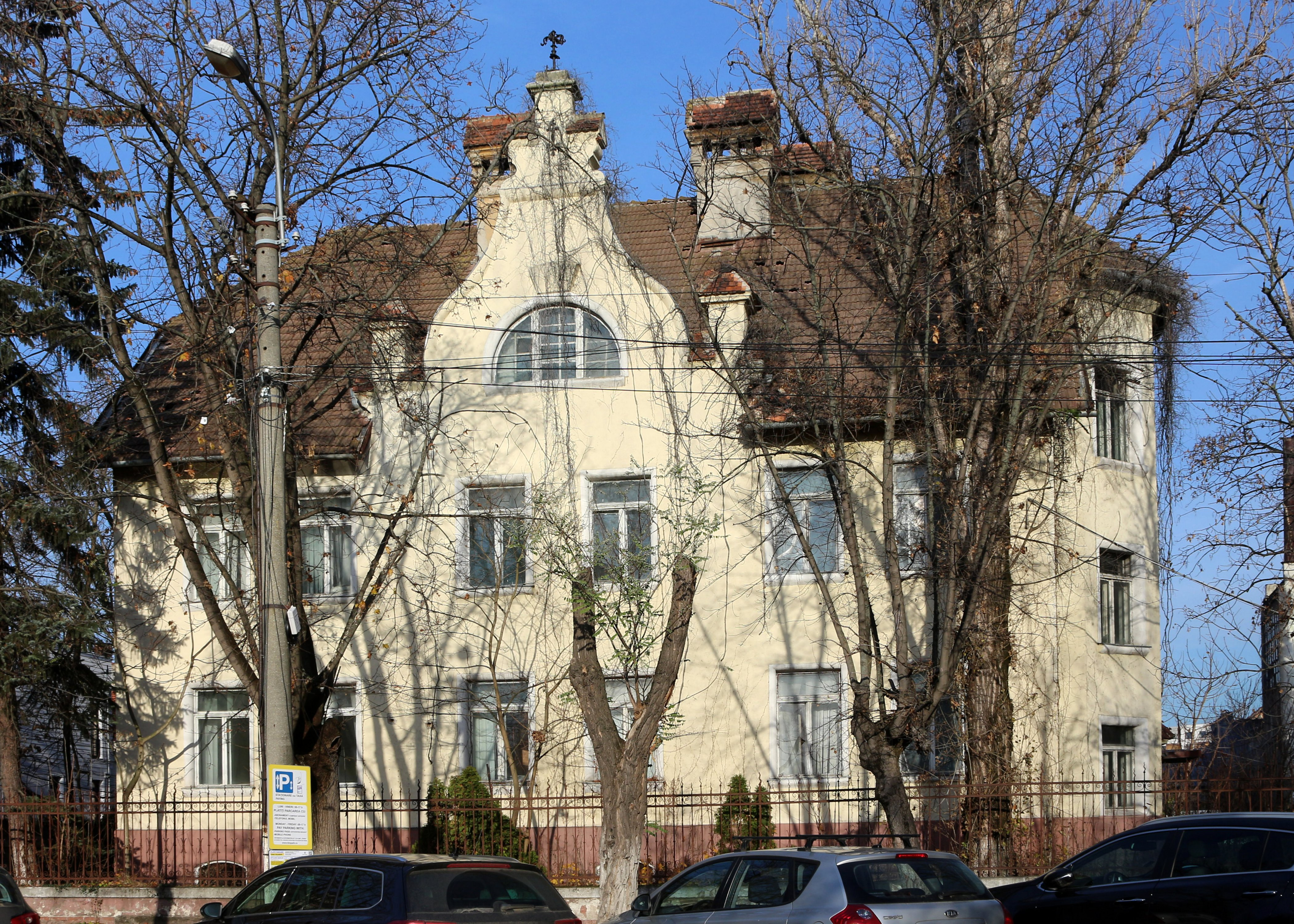
- The administrative building of the former hat factory
- Built: 1900
- Operated: 1900–2007
- Location: Timișoara, Romania
- Coordinates: 45°45′2″N 21°12′56″E
- Industry: Manufacturing
- Products: Caps, hats, scarves, gloves
- Employees: 140 (2007)
- Architect: Eduard Reiter
- Defunct: 2007

The Paltim Hat Factory, commonly known as the Iosefin Hat Factory (Romanian: Fabrica de pălării din Iosefin; Hungarian: Józsefvárosi kalapgyár; German: Josefstädter Hutfabrik), was a factory for the production of headgear located at 5 Nicolae Titulescu Embankment in the Iosefin district of the western Romanian city of Timișoara, on the right bank of the Bega River.

== History ==
The hat factory was likely established between 1882 and 1899, though there are varying sources regarding the exact founding year. The years 1882, 1896, and 1899 are all cited. The initial capital was 1.5 million crowns, with Philip Lustein, the founder of the Paltim company, securing 600,000 crowns in Austrian capital from entrepreneurs Faller, Pieck, and Riecken. Paltim was the first factory of its kind in southeastern Europe.

In 1899, the Timișoara City Hall entered into an agreement with Philip Lustein and Wilhelm Keller, under which the city provided a plot of land measuring two cadastral jugers (1,097 square fathoms) free of charge for the construction of a hat factory. This land was located near Scudier Park, on the street leading from the Thierry Swimming School to the railway viaduct and the Eduard Reiter Villa. As part of the contract, the factory was exempt from municipal taxes for a period of 10 years and, during that time, was required to provide an annual subsidy of up to 3,000 crowns, or 50 crowns for each worker employed. At the beginning of the 20th century, the general manager was Fritz Schwarz and Ernest Vermes was the commercial director.

When the building was completed in 1900, production at the hat factory began. Shortly after opening, the factory reported a daily output of 650 dozen cotton hats and 80 dozen rabbit fur hats. The factory was equipped with a steam engine generating 20 horsepower. The workforce ranged from 480 to 500 employees, with 70% of them being women. The headgear produced was exported across Europe as well as to North and South America. During World War I, Paltim manufactured hats and boots for the Austro-Hungarian military. Workers had access to a public bath, a canteen, and a recreation room.

In 1952, after receiving investments, the company expanded its product range to include civilian and military berets. It was the only factory in Romania producing these items. In 1972, Paltim started manufacturing protective helmets as well. Between 1948 and 1990, the company was nationalized, but in 1990, it was returned to private ownership. The privatization process was finalized in 1995, with a registered capital of 3,754,754 lei. A portion of the company was also acquired by the workers' union.

In 2006, SC Romarta SA from Bucharest acquired more than 60% of the company's shares. That same year, the final hat was produced, and the remaining 140 workers left the factory the following year. The products in the factory's portfolio included caps and hats made of wool, cotton, and rabbit hair, civilian and military berets, thermoplastic-backed hats, as well as scarves and gloves made of various fabrics. In recent years, several significant cultural initiatives have taken place within the buildings of the former hat factory, including the Daos and Road Patrol clubs, as well as the Basca cultural center (2017–2019) and Ambasada (2015–2019).

Belgian real estate developer Speedwell acquired the former hat factory in 2019 for around €7.7 million to develop a mixed-use complex with apartments and offices, preserving and rehabilitating the administrative building, which is a historical monument; the production halls were demolished, however.

=== Periam subsidiary ===
In addition to the hat factory in Timișoara, another factory operated in Periam, about 40 kilometers northwest, from 1892 until the post-war period. Johann Wohl, a hat maker, produced the first hats in Periam in 1865. In the following years, Johann Rudach established the foundation for the local hat factory, which began production in 1892. The main shareholder of the factory was Ioan Korber.

The factory stopped operating in 1940 due to a shortage of raw materials, despite having major partners in Europe, including Isac Naylor & Co. from Bradford, Wollimex from Zurich, Gebrüder Schmid from Basel, and Oscar Feustel from Lengfeld. In 1941, there was an effort to import wool from abroad, but due to the ongoing war, suppliers would only ship goods with advance payment. In 1948, the factory was nationalized. The Korber family lost ownership, and the facility was taken over by the Romanian state, receiving the new name Excelsior Hat Factory. A year later, in 1949, it was renamed the Lazăr Cernescu Hat Factory, after the communist activist Cernescu. Since 1955, the former Korber factory has been known as the Lux Periam Hat Factory. Later, during the latter half of the socialist era, the factory was incorporated as a branch of the Timișoara facility due to corporate consolidations.

Production here ceased at the end of 1996, but resumed in April 1997. The factory was closed on 1 August 2006.
