= Louis Țurcanu Children's Hospital =

Louis Țurcanu Emergency Clinical Hospital for Children
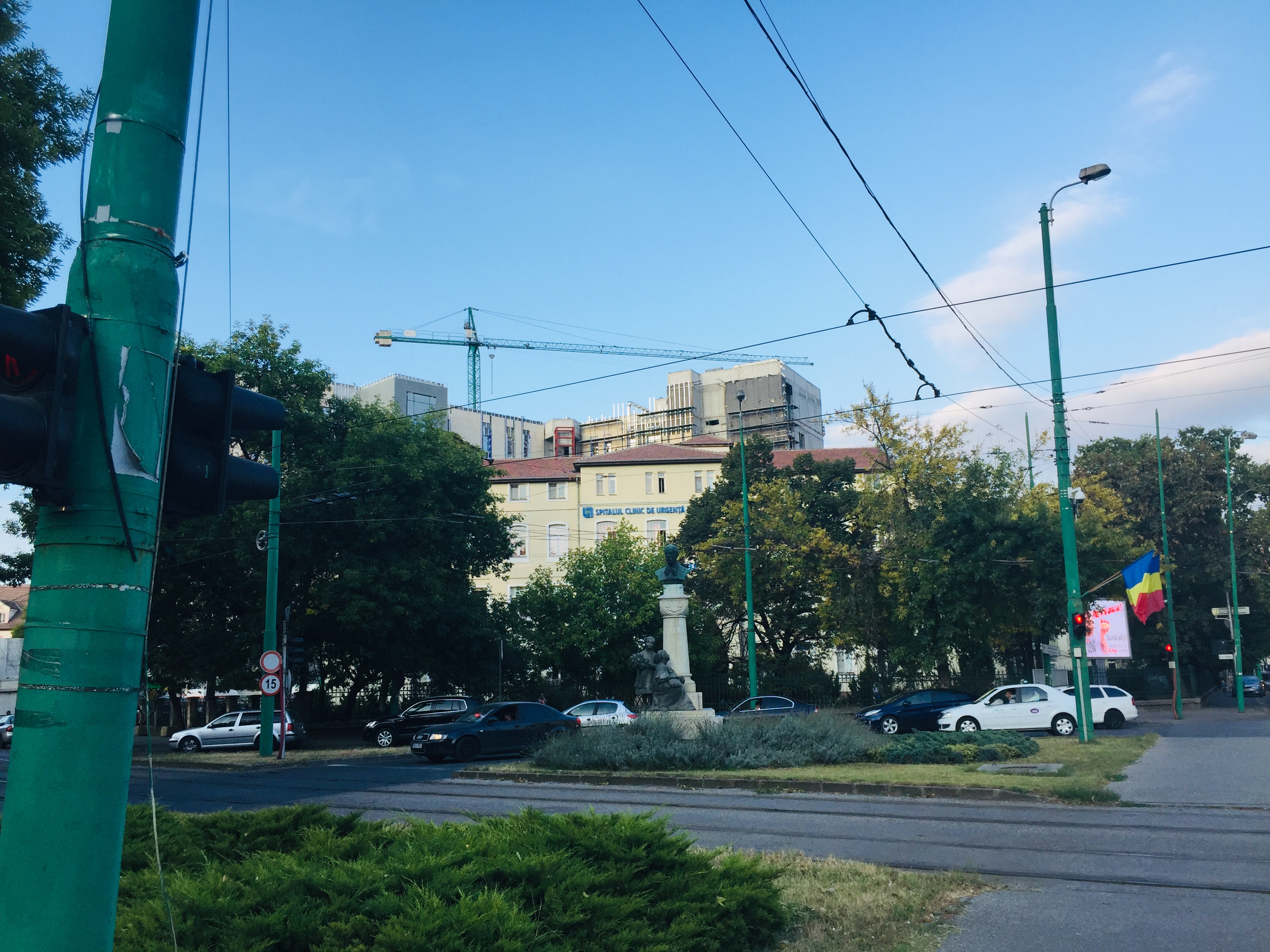
- The old and new buildings (under construction) of the Louis Țurcanu Children's Hospital. In the foreground is the bust of Anton Sailer (Miklós Ligeti, 1906).

Geography
- Location: Timișoara, Romania
- Coordinates: 45°45′14″N 21°13′18″E

Organisation
- Funding: Public hospital
- Type: Specialist

Services
- Emergency department: Yes
- Beds: 501
- Speciality: Pediatrics

History
- Opened: 1902

Links
- Website: www.spital-copii-timisoara.info

The Louis Țurcanu Emergency Clinical Hospital for Children (Romanian: Spitalul Clinic de Urgență pentru Copii „Louis Țurcanu”), located in Timișoara, is the only pediatric hospital in western Romania. It has departments and compartments that cover all child and adolescent pathology (501 continuous hospitalization beds), from emergency to chronic pathology.

== History ==
=== Beginnings ===
The Children's Hospital in Timișoara was built in 1902 with financial support from Anton Sailer. He donated 51,000 crowns to the White Cross Association, which covered half of the funds required for the hospital's construction. Born in Arad and working as a merchant in Timișoara, Anton Sailer devoted his wealth to charitable endeavors. In recognition of his generosity, he was named an honorary citizen of Timișoara in 1904. To honor him, a bust was placed in front of the hospital's main building in 1906, at the center of the former Horațiu Square, now known as Queen Mary Square. In 1913, a pediatric surgery department was established with ten beds, and between 1931 and 1942, the hospital expanded to include 100 beds.

=== Post-war period ===
In 1945, following the opening of the Victor Babeș University of Medicine and Pharmacy, one of Timișoara's first university hospitals was founded within the Children's Hospital. After the nationalization in 1948, the nearby PARC and Burian sanatoriums were integrated into the Children's Hospital, expanding its capacity to 180 beds. Emil Hurmuzache was appointed as the first director.

From 1950 to 1952, the clinic was expanded with two additional two-story wings. The hospital's capacity grew to 250 beds, and new facilities were added, including an outpatient clinic, a lecture hall for students, a library, and a dining room for mothers. In 1962, Louis Țurcanu, the future namesake of the clinic, was appointed as its director.

=== After the revolution of 1989 ===
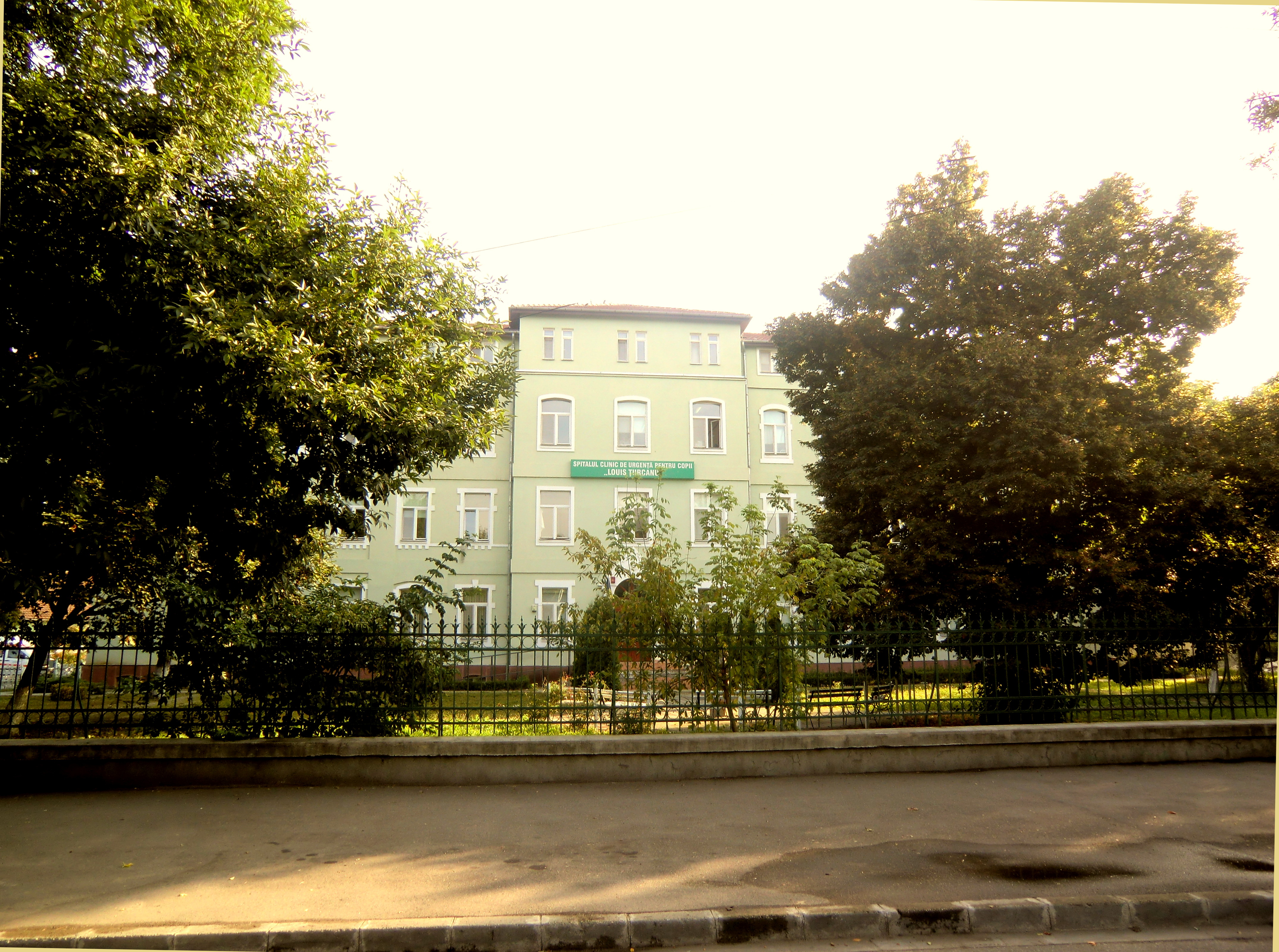
The hospital in 2010

In 1990, the Children's Hospital had 400 beds, a surgical department, a social pediatrics department, a tuberculosis ward, and an orphanage.

In the spring of 1990, the charitable organization Zukunft Rumäniens – Kinderklinik Temeswar e.V. was established in Hamburg. Donata of Prussia, widow of Louis Ferdinand of Prussia, was appointed as the first chairwoman. Early in 1990, 4,000 donation appeals were distributed, with an encouraging reply and a personal contribution from Rita Süssmuth, the President of the Bundestag. In Romania, Romanian Orthodox Metropolitan Nicolae Corneanu emerged as a key supporter of the initiative. In Germany, Bundestag member Klaus Francke played a pivotal role in advocating for the association within the federal government. In 1994, a request for funding was submitted to the Federal Ministry of the Interior. The association's funds, which were entirely derived from donations, totaled around 1,000,000 DM. By the end of 1994, the Federal Ministry of the Interior approved a grant of 743,000 DM to purchase medical-technical equipment, using funds allocated for the ethnic German population in Romania.

On 30 August 1995, Bundestag President Rita Süssmuth personally laid the foundation stone for the new surgical department. The construction of the new surgical wing was completed within a year, and modern medical equipment was delivered and installed from Germany. The new surgical department was officially inaugurated and commissioned on 17 December 1996, with the ceremonial opening conducted by Ministerial Director Klaus Pöhle.

In 1999, the old main building of the pediatric surgery department was renovated and upgraded to Western standards with funding from Romania. A new 150-bed facility was constructed between 2014 and 2025. It accommodates the emergency department, diagnostic laboratories, polyclinic, radiology, pediatric surgery, intensive care, orthopedics, and the neonatal intensive care unit.
