= Anchor Palace =

- Romanian: Palatul Ancora; Hungarian: Horgony-palota; German: Anker Palast
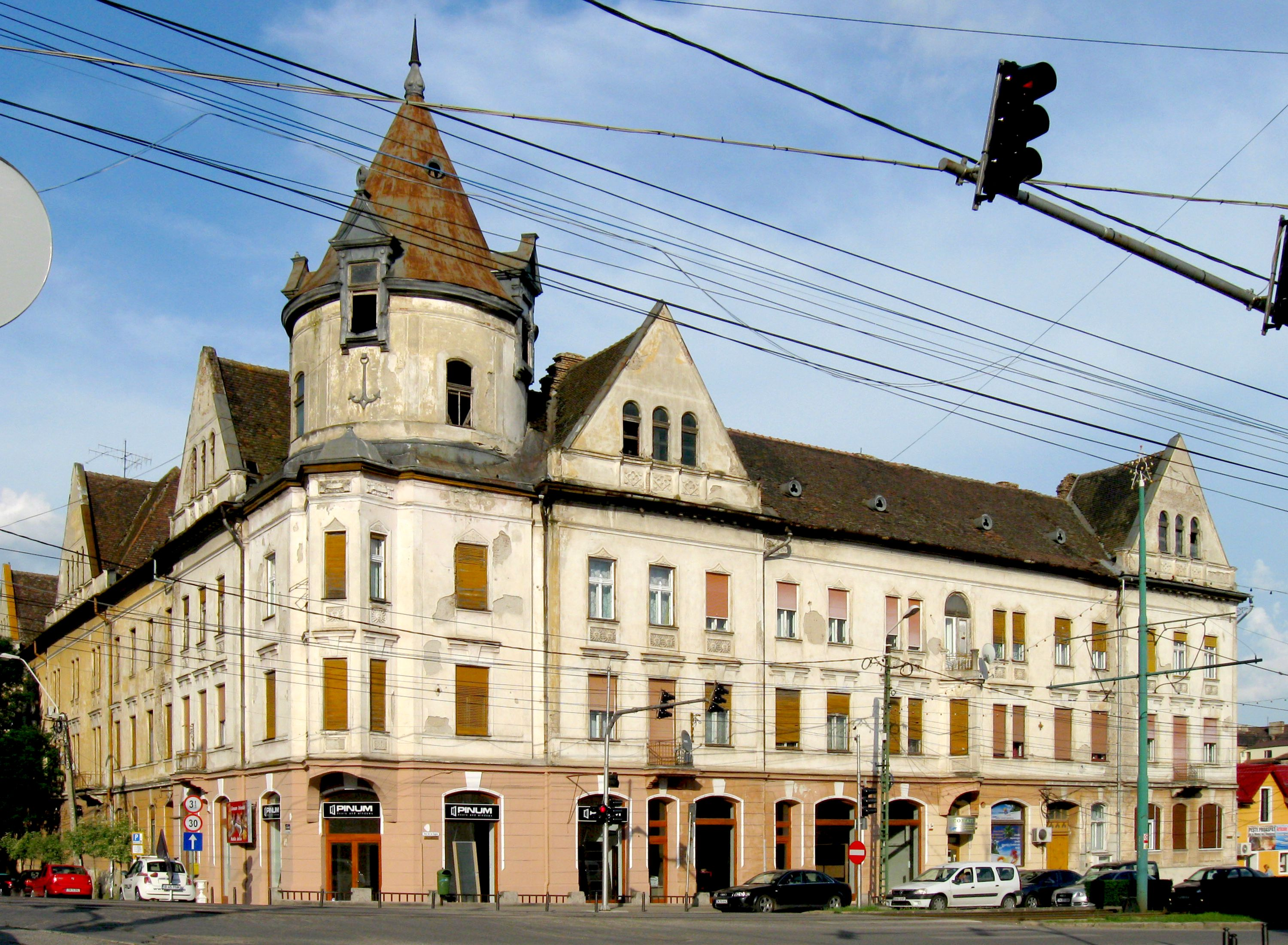
- Interactive map of the Anchor Palace area
- Former names: Sailer-Kudelich Palace

General information
- Architectural style: Historicist
- Location: Timișoara, Romania
- Coordinates: 45°44′49″N 21°12′37″E
- Construction started: 1901
- Completed: 1902

Design and construction
- Architect: Martin Gemeinhardt

The Anchor Palace (Romanian: Palatul Ancora; Hungarian: Horgony-palota; German: Anker Palast), originally known as the Kuderlich-Sailer Palace, is a historical monument in Timișoara, Romania. It stands in the Iosefin district, at the intersection of General Ion Dragalina Boulevard and Tudor Vladimirescu Embankment, along the Bega Canal. It got its name from the anchor exposed on its facade, reminiscent of naval trade on Bega.

== History ==
The area on the left bank of the Bega Canal, near the current Stephen the Great Bridge, was initially known as Zum Grünen Anger (English: green meadow). The current name of the palace is a linguistic confusion: Anger is an archaic word of German origin meaning "small meadow", while Anker means "anchor". The plot of land was used for gardening and belonged to the Sailer family. On the corner where the palace stands today, a small building was built where the Navigation Office of the Commercial Port of Timișoara operated for a while. Later, the Golden Anchor restaurant was opened there, which was a popular meeting palace for families and advertised itself as the "most pleasant entertainment place".

A heiress granddaughter of German philanthropist Anton Sailer married Aladár Kuderlich, former director of the Hungarian Credit Bank, Elisabetin branch. In 1902 Kuderlich built on the site of the restaurant the palace known as Kuderlich Palace or Kuderlich-Sailer Palace. The building housed spacious three-, four- and five-room apartments, which were already connected to water, gas and electricity when they were handed over. A restaurant continued to operate on the ground floor of the palace, the confusion with the restaurant's company being accepted in the name Anchor Palace, and the decorative motif of the anchor was used on the palace.

The original anchor from the façade was removed when the Navigation Office was demolished in 1902 and entered the collection of the National Museum of Banat on 31 October 1906, as a donation from publicist Karl Steiner. Measuring 97 cm in length, it has four arms, while a decorative iron bow, with no practical purpose, was attached to the upper ring.

== Architecture ==
The building is located on the banks of the Bega Canal, on the eastern corner of the intersection between General Ion Dragalina Boulevard and Tudor Vladimirescu Embankment. It is a large building, with commercial premises on the ground floor, and residences on the two floors. The building permit was issued on 24 August 1901, and the building was completed on 7 July 1902. It is considered one of the first palaces designed by German architect Martin Gemeinhardt.

The style is historicist with neo-Romanesque and neo-Gothic decorations, having oversized gables, and the corner tower with its circular section and conical roof is of medieval inspiration. The woodwork and decorative elements were crafted by Timișoara master carpenter Michael Albert, renowned for constructing the city's first wooden bridges for horse-drawn trams, as well as the revolving stage installed at the city theatre in 1894.
