= Iosefin =

Iosefin Józsefváros (Hungarian) Josefstadt (German)
- District of Timișoara
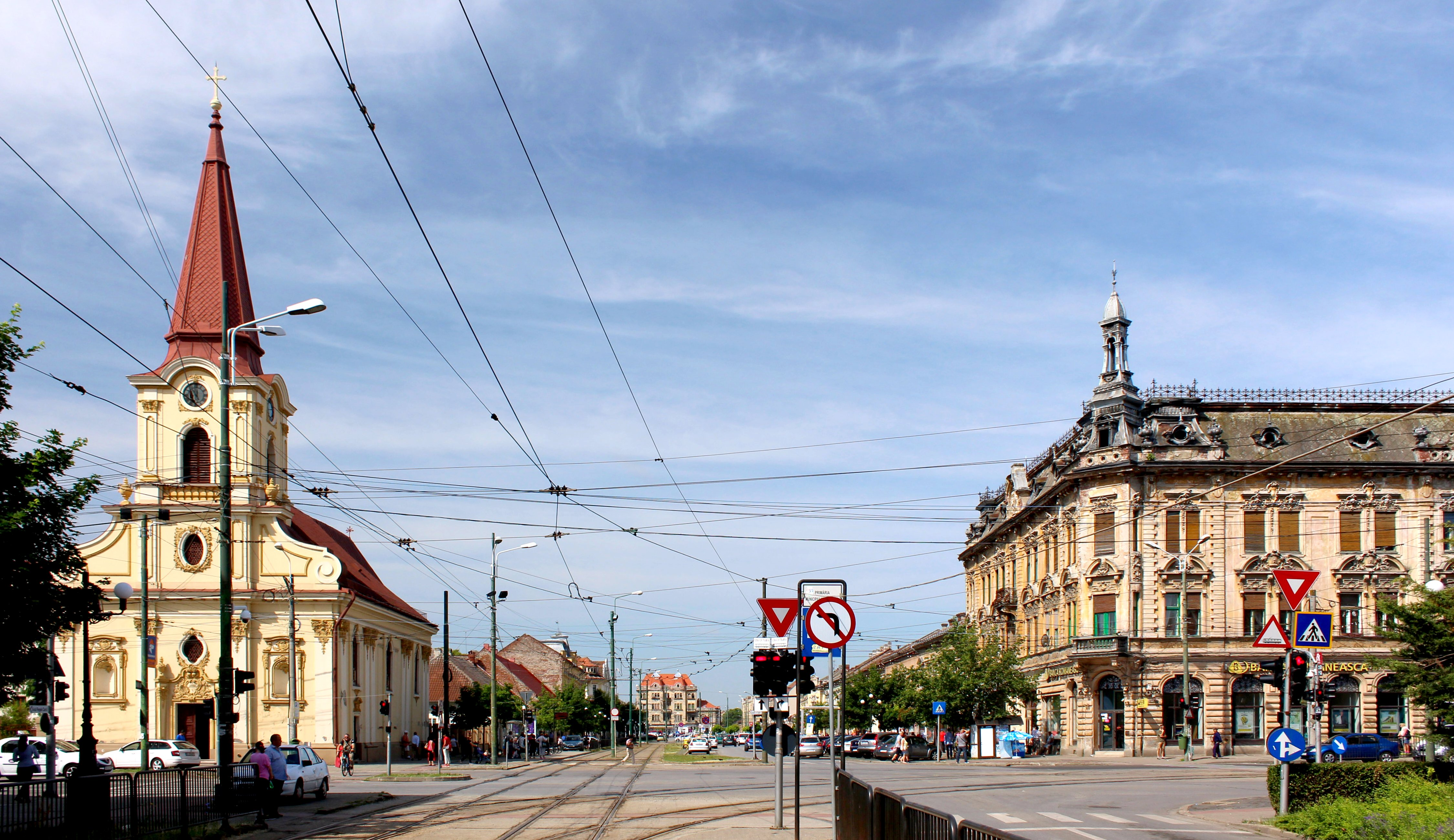
- General Ion Dragalina Boulevard in Iosefin
- Etymology: Emperor Joseph II
- Interactive map of Iosefin
- Coordinates: 45°44′39.5″N 21°12′27.2″E
- Country: Romania
- County: Timiș
- City: Timișoara
- Established: 1744

Area
  - Total: 4.42 km^{2} (1.71 sq mi)

Iosefin (Hungarian: Józsefváros; German: Josefstadt) is a historic district in western Timișoara. It was founded during the mid-18th century, at the beginning being just a village of German settlers, located on the outskirts of the walls of the Timișoara Fortress. Its name comes from that of Emperor Joseph II, during whose reign it was founded. Unlike most of the other Timișoara districts, the historic Iosefin is not divided into further districts or residential areas. However, mostly in the 1970s, numerous new development areas with their own names (but without an administrative function) emerged on the southern edge of Iosefin. They are called Dâmbovița, Șagului Vest I, Șagului Vest II and Steaua. Iosefin is twinned with Vienna's Josefstadt and Budapest's Józsefváros.

== History ==
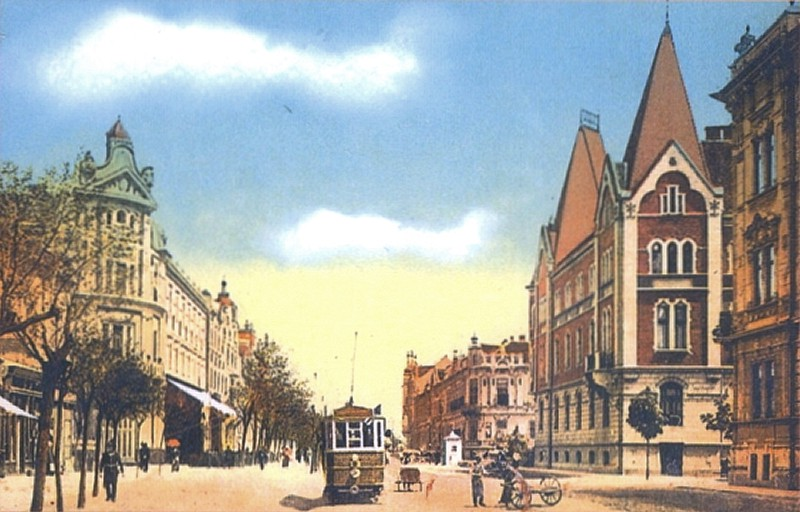
Hunyadi Street (today 16 December 1989 Boulevard) marks the historical boundary between Iosefin and Elisabetin districts.

Until after 1716, the area of present-day Iosefin was not inhabited. There were no constructions here (except for the so-called "Roman entrenchment", whose actual date of execution is unknown, but which crossed present-day Iosefin). The original core of Iosefin was approved in 1744. Located southwest of the 948-meter-wide Non ædificandi belt, it had three main streets: the present-day Dragalina, Bolintineanu–Văcărescu and Pop de Băsești–Maniu streets. Originally called Noile Maiere Germane (Hungarian: Új Német Majorok; German: Neue Deutsche Meierhöfe), Iosefin was designed from the beginning as a village of German settlers, on both sides of the Bega Canal. The houses had luxuriant gardens, used by the bourgeoisie in Cetate as refuges. Its current name was given in 1773 in honor of Emperor Joseph II, after his second visit to Timișoara (Joseph II first visited Timișoara in 1767). Other names, albeit temporary, include Prince Carol during the interwar period and 1 May during the communist period.

Iosefin had a rural aspect until the connection of Timișoara to the railway system of Central Europe in 1857, when the first railway station of the city was built north of this district. In the area between Bega and the railway station, the construction of factories spurred in the second half of the 19th century. At that time, alcohol, tobacco, matches, hats, silk, butter, chains and machines, among others, were produced here. The city's port was also built in Iosefin.

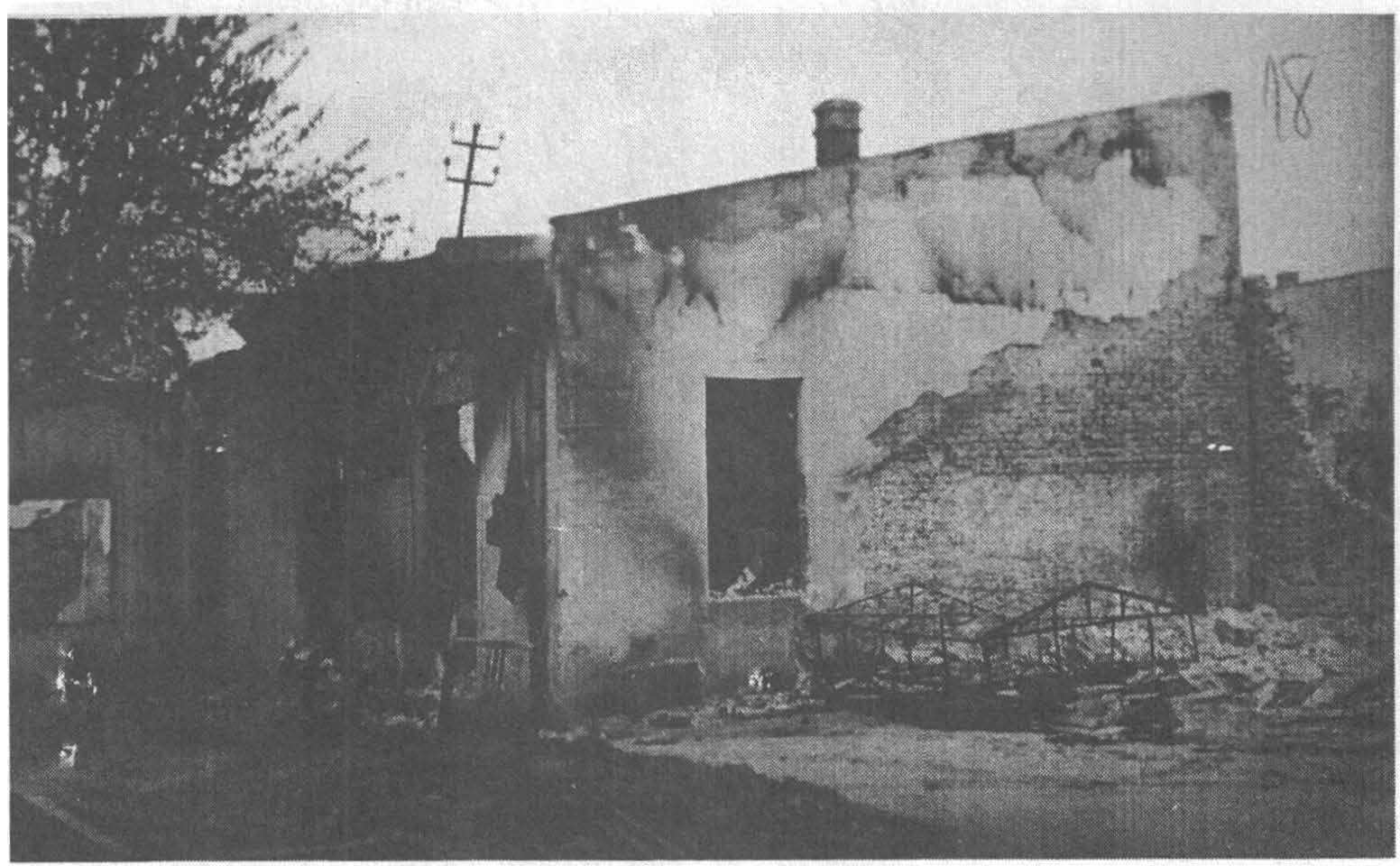
Damaged building in Iosefin after the Allied bombings of 1944

During World War II, Iosefin was bombed by both the Allied and Axis forces, resulting in human casualties as well as damage to residential, industrial, and institutional buildings. Among the structures hit were the Domnița Elena Railway Station, the Chain Factory, the Great Mill, the Tobacco Factory, the Match Factory, the Spirit Factory, the Prohászka Mill, the Terminus Hotel, and numerous homes.

== Buildings and structures ==
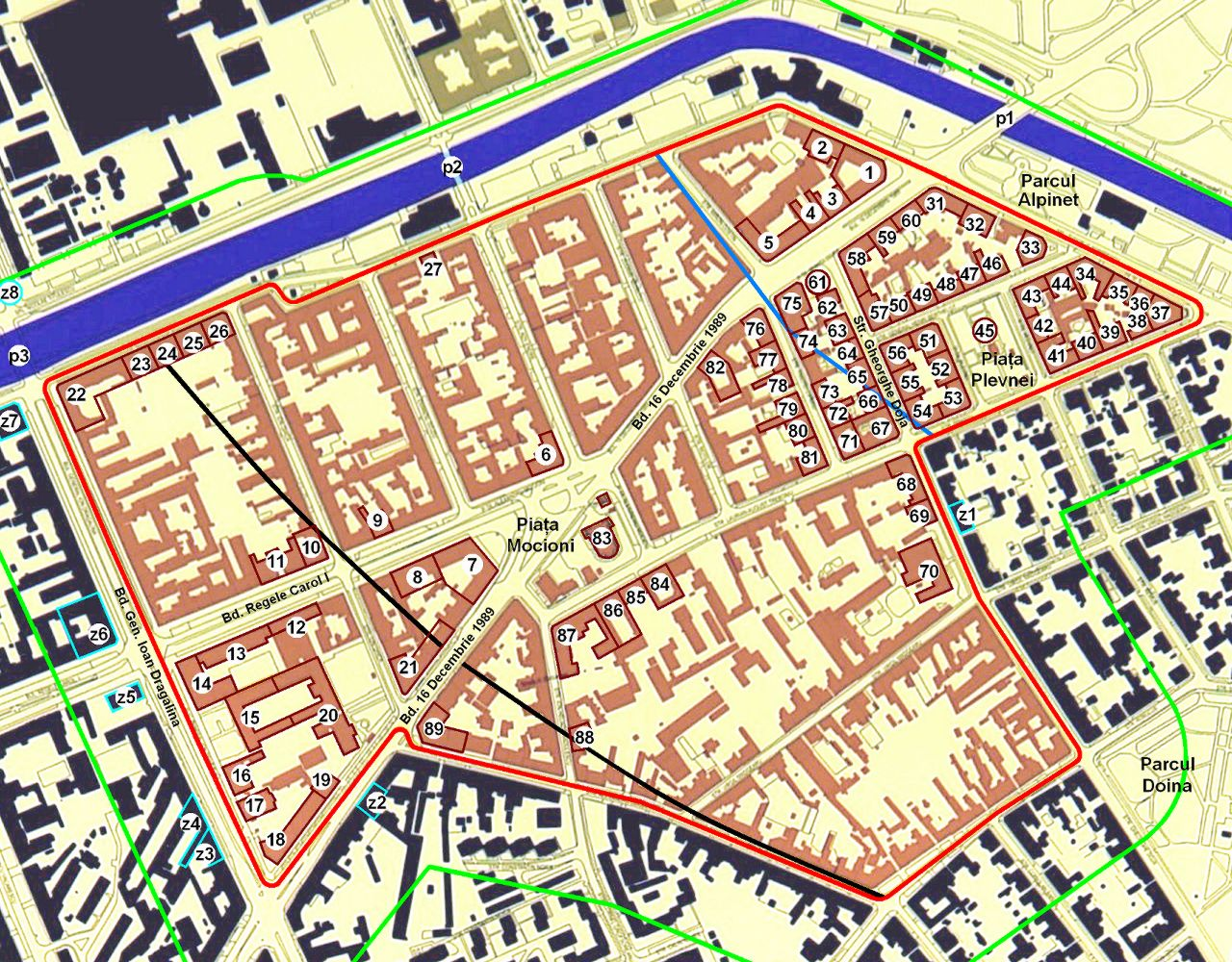
Old Iosefin urban site

Apart from the Roman Catholic church, which was built between 1774 and 1775, all the buildings in Iosefin are built after 1868, most of them around 1900. The district is characterized by continuous street fronts and buildings with low height and relatively high density. There are numerous buildings in historicist/eclectic style, typical of the second half of the 19th century, as well as some valuable architectural ensembles in the 1900s style with its specific stylistic derivations – Art Nouveau, Jugendstil or Secession. The industrial and utilitarian architecture of Iosefin, made in the 1900s style, is represented by several inedited edifices, including the former cigarette factory (built in 1846, the first of its kind on the current territory of Romania) or the water tower. Today, the old district of Iosefin is a protected urban site of national importance.

=== Places of worship ===
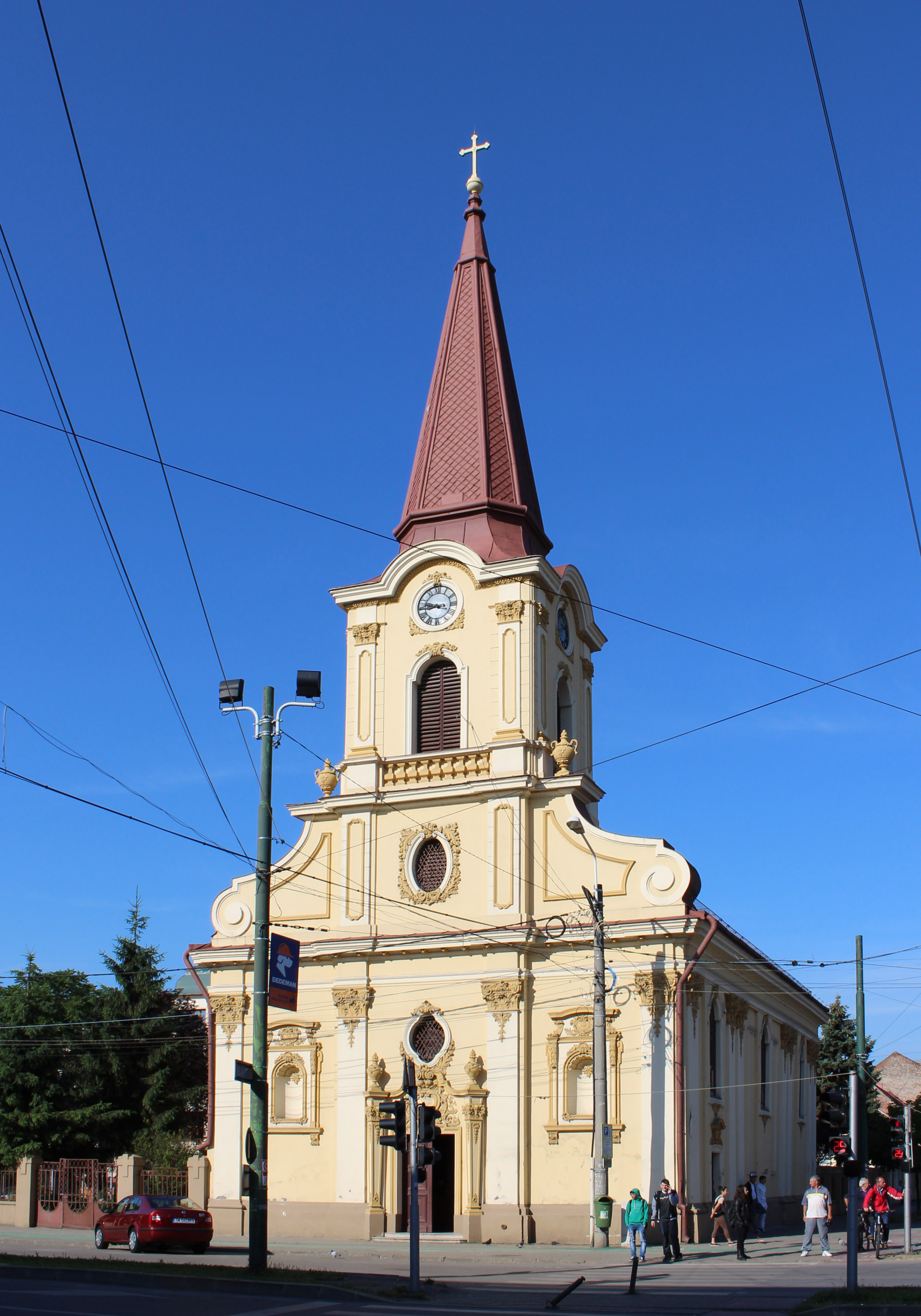
Church of the Nativity of Mary (1774)

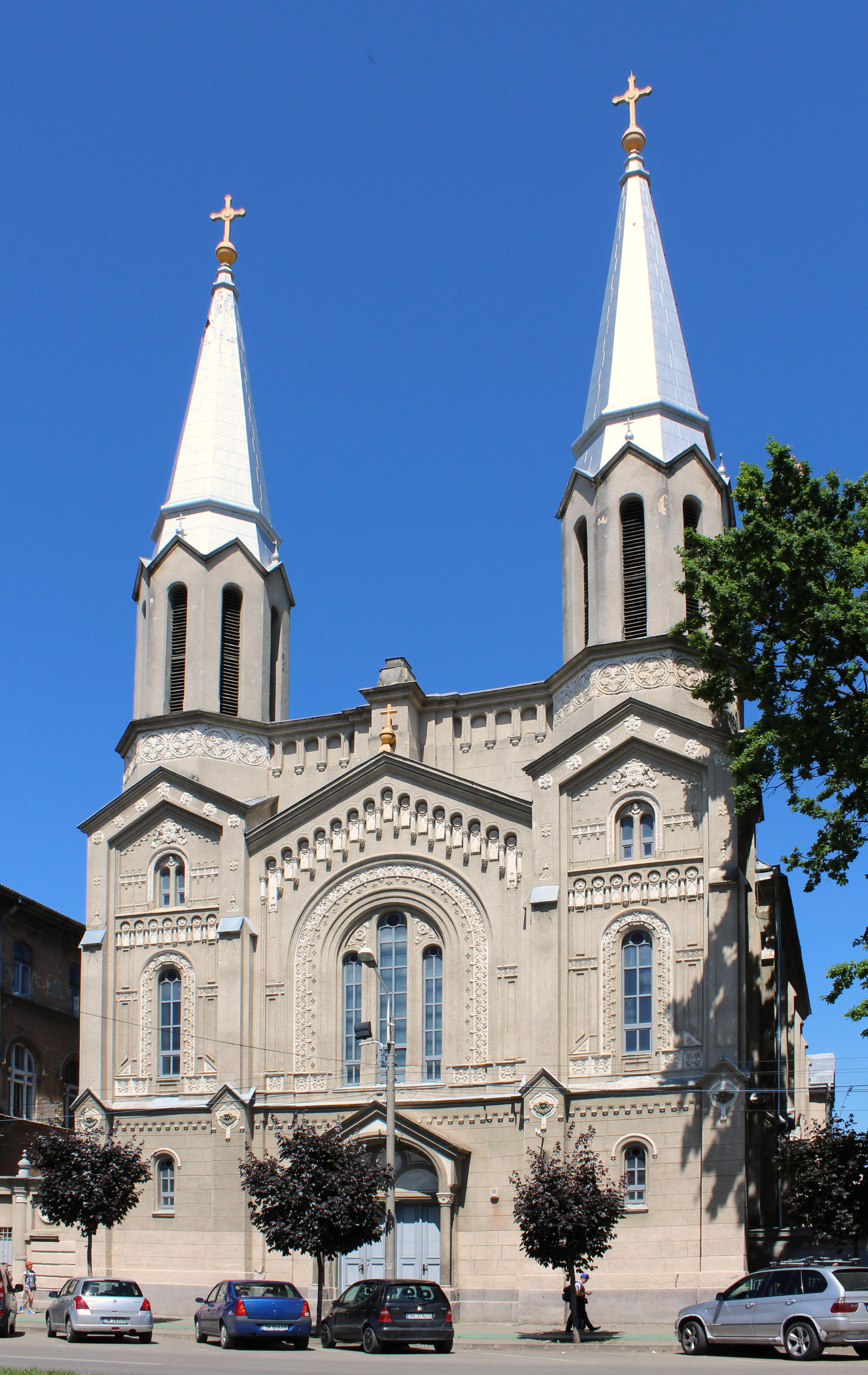
Notre Dame Church (1894)

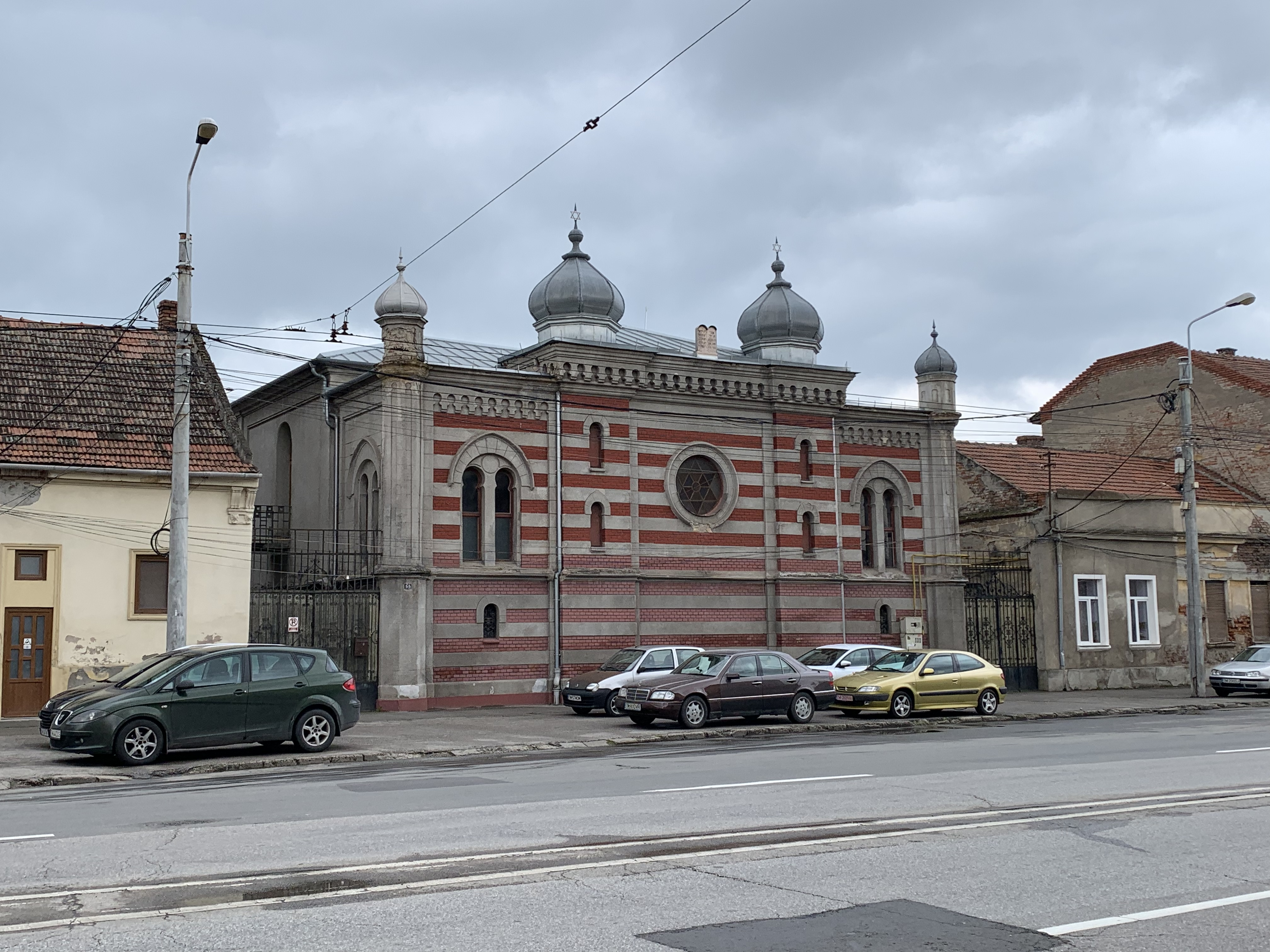
Orthodox Synagogue (1910)

=== Palaces ===
- Anchor Palace (1902)
- Gemeinhardt Palace (1912)
- Gudenus Palace (1913)
- Csermák Twin Palaces (1912)
- former Délvidéki Casino (1905)
- Hochstrasser Palace (1914)
- Miksa Palace (1912)
- Pisică Palace (1912)
- Schott Palace (1913)
- Water Palace (1901)

=== Bridges ===
- Gelu Walkway
- General Ion Dragalina Bridge
- Heroes' Bridge
- Iron Bridge
- Iuliu Maniu Bridge
- Modoș Bridge
