= 3 August 1919 Boulevard =

Boulevard in Timișoara, Romania

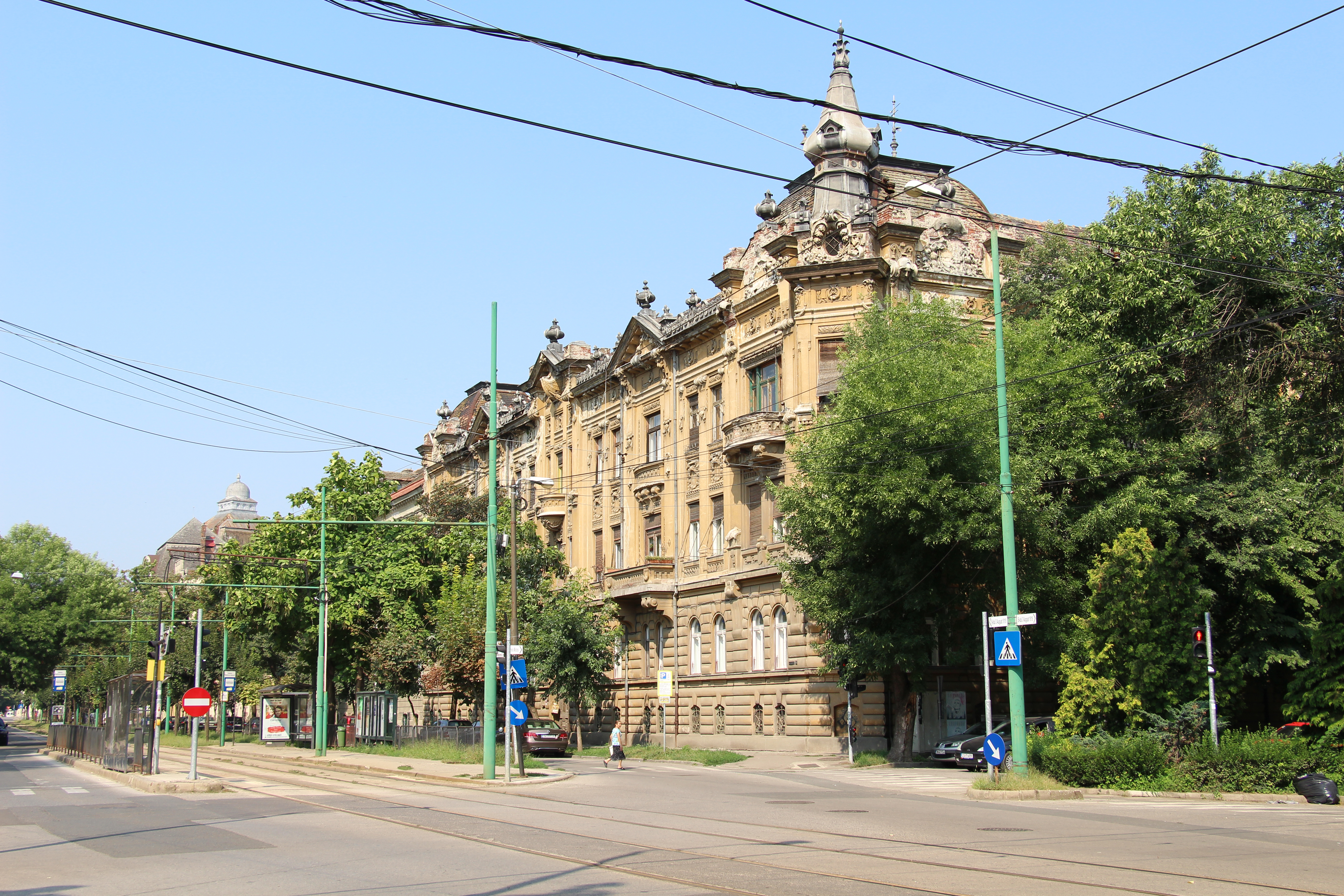
- Interactive map of 3 August 1919 Boulevard
- Native name: 3 August 1919 (Romanian)
- Former name: 12 April 1961
- Maintained by: Timișoara City Hall
- Length: 666.19 m (2,185.7 ft)
- Location: Fabric, Timișoara, Romania
- Coordinates: 45°45′24″N 21°14′40″E
- From: Decebalus Bridge
- To: Trajan Square

3 August 1919 Boulevard (Romanian: Bulevardul 3 August 1919) is a boulevard in the Fabric district of Timișoara, Romania. Named in honor of the entry of Romanian troops into Timișoara, thus consecrating the union of Banat with Romania, the boulevard connects Fabric to the city center. It presents a unified northern fronton, being furnished with monumental buildings.

== History ==
In plans from the end of 1734, the route of the future "Main Street" (Hauptstraße)—also known as "Middle Street" (Mittelgasse), now corresponding to Dacians' and Stephen the Great streets—is shown for the first time in history. It extended between the present-day Petru Rareș and Metropolitan Alexandru Sterca-Șuluțiu squares and was bounded to the south by Hasengasse.

In 1744, the construction of three residential districts was approved: Fabric, Maierele Noi (Germane, now Iosefin), and Mehala—all designed "on the blueprint." That same year, the establishment of the "Esplanade" was also authorized: a 948-meter-wide open strip surrounding the fortifications, where construction was prohibited to prevent offering potential cover to enemy forces besieging the Timișoara Fortress. Plans from this period show the first appearance of the route of what is now 3 August 1919 Boulevard, starting with the segment connecting Fabric to Cetate. The northern stretch—from Trajan Square to Zlatna Street—followed precisely the current alignment. From there, the road curved slightly southward toward the Mill Canal (Mühlkanal), a waterway once flowing along the eastern edge of today's Academician Corneliu Micloși Square. It then continued roughly along its present-day path, skirting the northern boundary of the fortress commander's garden—located where Queen Marie Park stands today—until reaching the site of the current Neptune Palace. At this point, the road veered southwest, aligning approximately with today's Ludwig van Beethoven Street as it passed through the bastion fortifications, which were still under construction at the time.

Although the route of today's 3 August 1919 Boulevard lay within the "Esplanade" area, on its northern side between present-day Trajan Square and Mill Canal, historical city plans show a few isolated structures along this stretch—likely temporary buildings. During the 19th century, the Fabric district saw remarkable growth. By the mid-century, it was home to 53.04% of Timișoara's civilian population, with the suburb containing seven times more "houses" than the fortress itself.

In 1868, a decision was made to reduce the width of the "Esplanade" to 569 meters. The boundary of this newly narrowed no-build zone intersected the route of the current 3 August 1919 Boulevard near the western edge of today's Academician Corneliu Micloși Square. With construction permitted east of this line, the second development phase of the boulevard began. A distinctive feature of Timișoara's urban growth was its expansion from the outer districts toward the center—constrained at the time by military fortifications—rather than the typical pattern of cities developing outward from the center. It was during this period that the first buildings appeared along what is now 3 August 1919 Boulevard, including the Archduke's House, which was purchased in 1873 by Archduke Johann Salvator of Habsburg-Tuscany.

The first horse-drawn tram line in Timișoara, inaugurated on 8 July 1869, connected St. George Square in Cetate with what is now Romans' Square. Between the Neptune Palace (formerly known as the Hungária Palace) and Romans' Square, the line ran approximately along the present-day route of 3 August 1919 Boulevard.

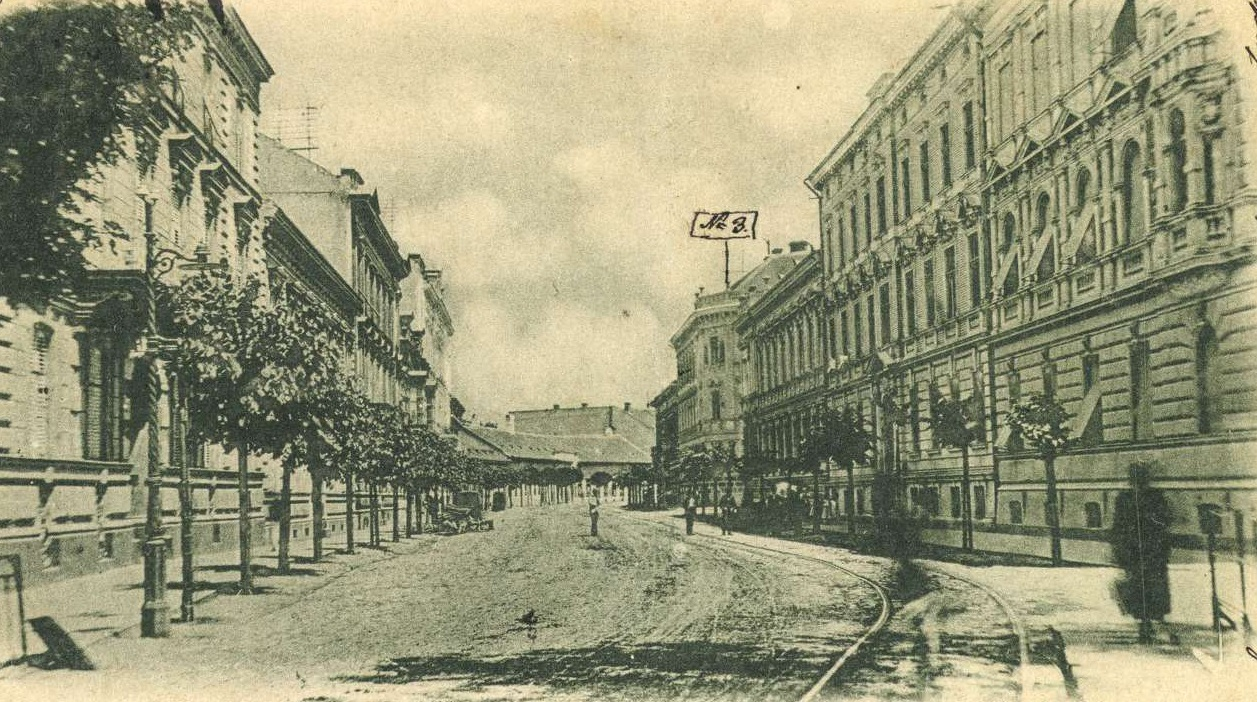
Andrássy út in 1898

In 1892, a decision was made to "defortify" the fortress, formally ending its role as a military stronghold. Between 1893 and 1895, the "royal chief engineer" Sebestény Aladár Kovács, together with architect Ludwig von Ybl, developed plans to connect the outer districts with the former fortress area and transform Timișoara into a cohesive, unified city. According to urban legend, the scale of their proposed plan was said to rival that of an American city. Construction was now permitted west of the present-day Academician Corneliu Micloși Square, marking the third phase in the formation of the current boulevard. By 1901, the square had taken on its current width. On the western side, the new buildings along the boulevard were not aligned directly with the Archduke's House but instead shifted slightly northward, creating a jog in the layout. This adjustment gave the boulevard a broader width at that point.

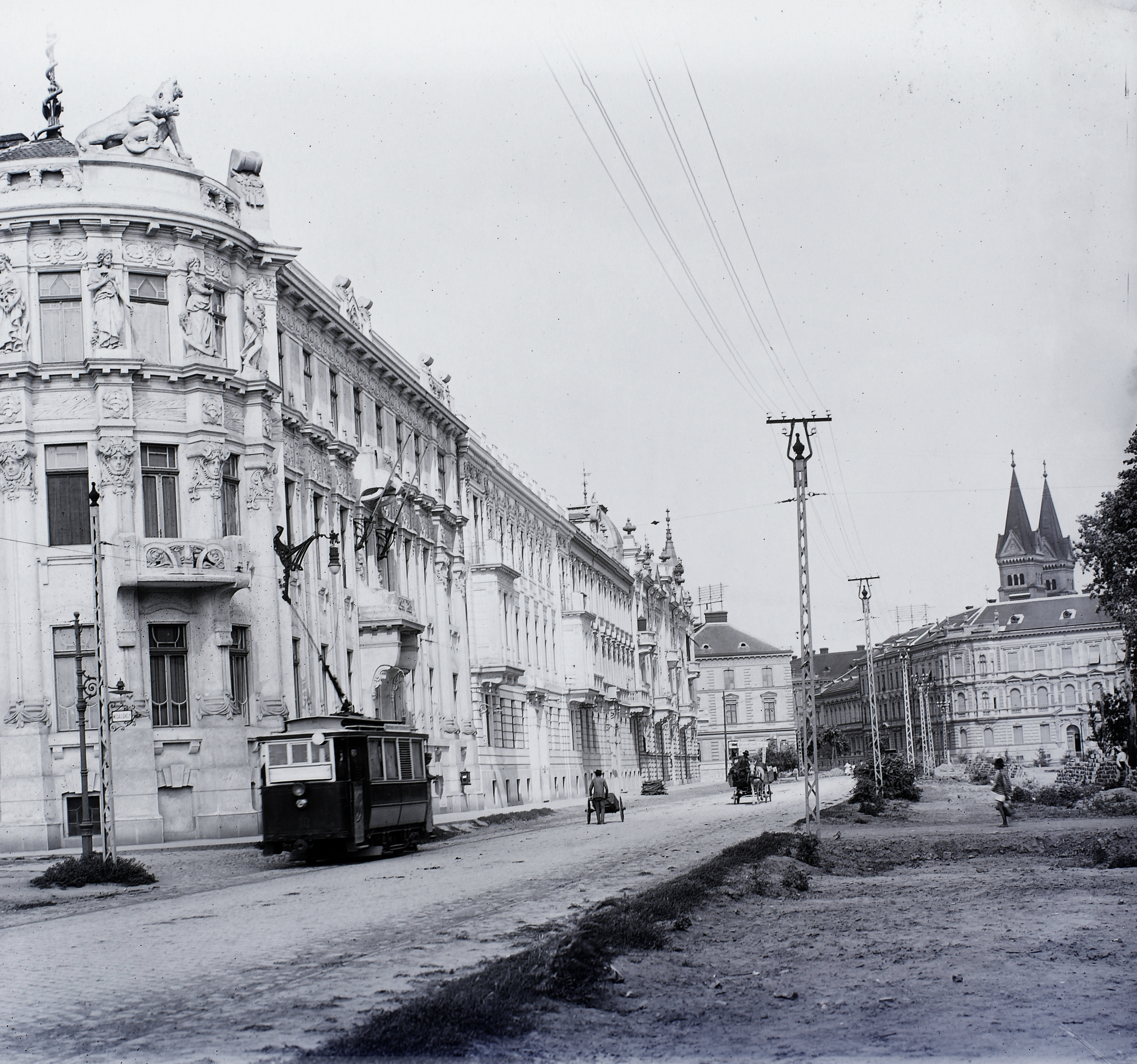
Liget-sor in 1904. On the right in the background are the towers of the Millennium Church.

The plans from 1901 to 1903 also included the opening of what is now Zlatna Street on the eastern side of the boulevard. The final stage involved the construction of architect László Székely's mother's palace (built between March and October 1911 at 1 3 August 1919 Boulevard) and his own residence, known as the Neptune Palace (constructed between 1912 and 1914 at 1 Splaiul Nistrului), both designed according to Székely's plans.

== Architecture ==
The current 3 August 1919 Boulevard features a continuous northern facade, adorned with monumental buildings stretching from Academician Corneliu Micloși Square to Splaiul Nistrului. This facade includes the Neptune Palace (originally owned by architect László Székely), the palace of the widow Székely (the architect's mother), as well as the Kunz, Anheuer, Haymann, and Steiner palaces.

The building facades along 3 August 1919 Boulevard, between Splaiul Nistrului and Academician Corneliu Micloși Square, predominantly reflect the Secession style of the early 1900s, with two notable exceptions: the Illits and Steiner palaces. These two stand out with their heavily rusticated plinths and horizontal bands that recall the Italian Renaissance. Higher up, decorative features such as caryatids and, in the case of the Steiner Palace, ship motifs emerging from its pediment contribute to a distinctive eclectic character. The Steiner Palace bears a resemblance to the Hungarian River Administration building in Budapest, designed by architects Kármán and Ullmann and constructed between 1910 and 1913.

Among the Secession-style facades, the Anheuer Palace is particularly notable for its overall floral decoration and especially for the female figures holding lyres that adorn its uppermost register. Another distinctive Secession facade is the Kunz Palace, designed by architect Gábor Fodor, which stands out due to its prominent pilasters and capitals shaped like female mascarons.

With its austere geometric form and minimalistic style free of decorative excess, the widow Székely's house stands out as a unique structure along the former Liget Boulevard, anticipating the modernist approach of the renowned Viennese architect Adolf Loos by several years.

In front of the Neptun Palace is the Pietà monument by sculptor Péter Jecza, erected in memory of the 1989 Revolution.

Sculptor Ștefan Călărășanu resided in the Kunz Palace, which also housed the first free art school in its attic, opened in 1926. The building became known as the Artists' House. Notable instructors at this school included Albert Varga, Julius Podlipny, Nándor Kóra-Korber, Ferdinand Gallas, Oscar Szuhanek, and Albert Kristóf-Krausz. During the interwar period, sculptor Romul Ladea maintained his workshop in this same building.

== See also ==
- Queen of England Inn, historic building at 27 3 August 1919 Boulevard
