= Archduke's House =

- Casa Arhiducelui
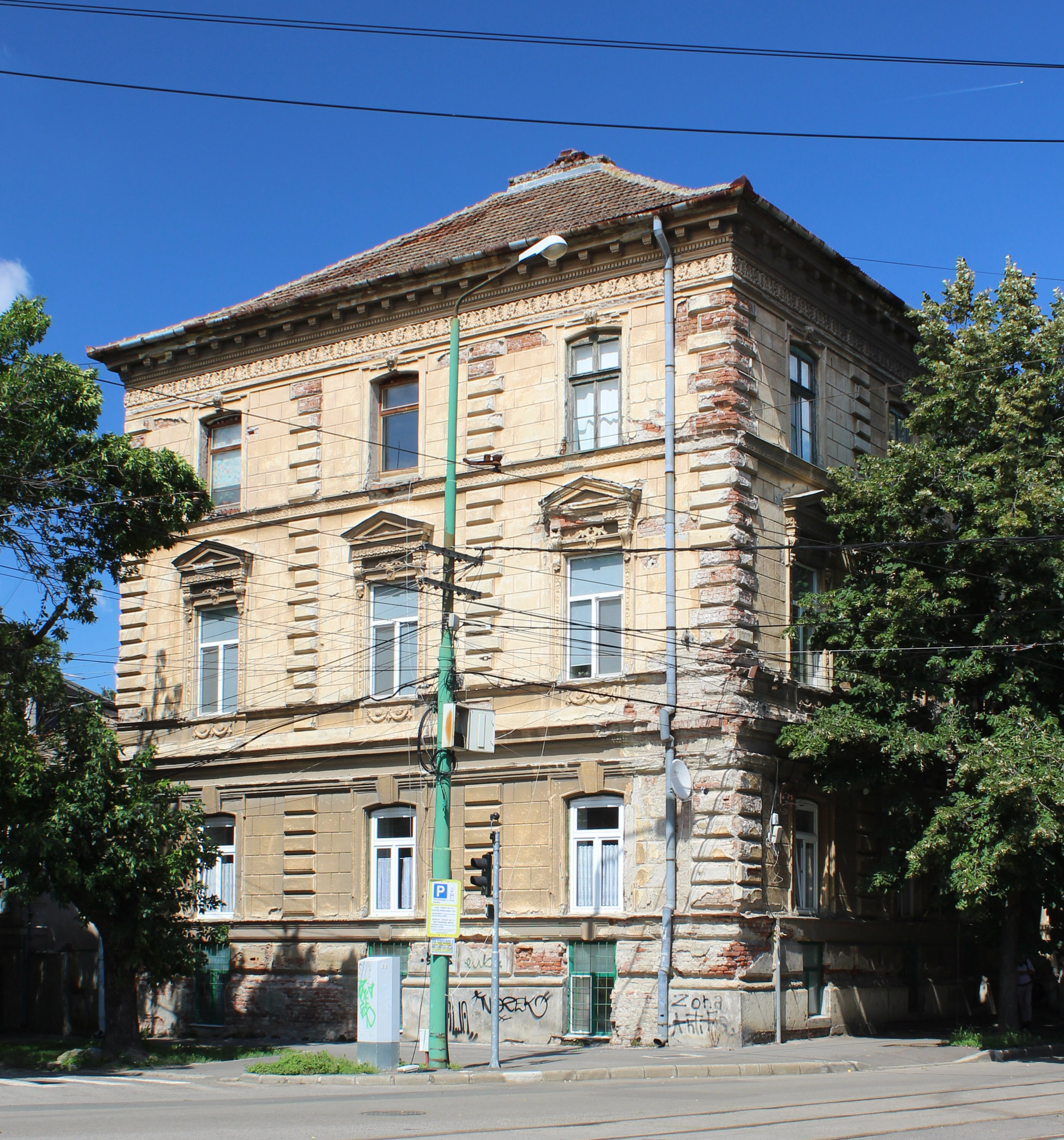
- Interactive map of the Archduke's House area
- Alternative names: Josef Kunz House; Illés Herczl House

General information
- Architectural style: Neoclassical
- Location: 11 3 August 1919 Boulevard, Timișoara, Romania
- Coordinates: 45°45′25″N 21°14′42″E
- Completed: 1870

Design and construction
- Architect: Josef Kunz

The Archduke's House (Romanian: Casa Arhiducelui), also known as Josef Kunz House or Illés Herczl House, is a late Neoclassical building located at 11 3 August 1919 Boulevard in the Fabric district of Timișoara, Romania. It is part of the Fabric (II) monument complex.

== History ==
In 1868, the construction restriction along the Esplanade in Timișoara's Fabric district was reduced from 500 fathoms (about 949 meters) to 300 fathoms (about 569 meters), enabling the opening of the area between the city park (now Queen Marie Park) and Coronini Square (now Romans' Square).

In Old Timișoara in the last half century (1870–1920), Josef Geml—mayor of Timișoara between 1914 and 1918—notes that most of the buildings along 3 August 1919 Boulevard, stretching from the Kunz House/Archduke’s House to the Queen of England Inn in Romans' Square, were constructed by Josef Kunz. Additionally, historical sources indicate that the second two-story building in the Fabric district, located at 1 Bishop József Lonovics Street, was likewise built by Kunz. As a result, Bishop József Lonovics Street was commonly known as "Kunz Row" for an extended period.

The building, constructed around 1870 by the entrepreneur Josef Kunz in the Fabric district, was among the earliest two-story structures in the area. This development aroused resentment among other property owners, who feared that it might lead to a decline in the value of their own houses.

Josef Kunz (1823–1895) was an entrepreneur and architect who pursued engineering studies at the Polytechnic Institute in Vienna between 1842 and 1846 and later studied architecture in Munich from December 1846 to July 1847, although he did not complete a formal degree. Upon his return to Timișoara, he established the brick factory Josef Kunz & Co., which remained in operation until the 1930s. Throughout his career, Kunz was responsible for the construction of numerous buildings and played a significant role in shaping the architectural development of Timișoara.

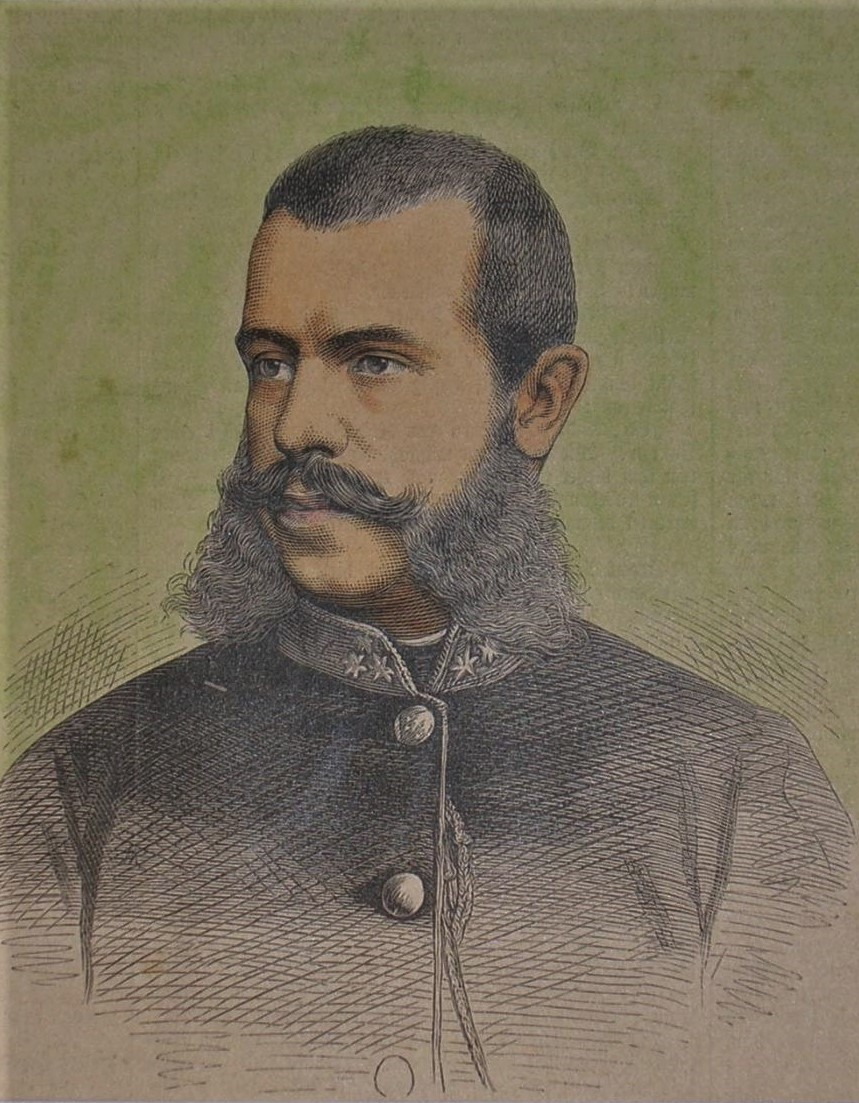
Archduke Johann Salvator of Austria in 1878

The building drew the interest of Archduke Johann Salvator of Austria, who purchased it in 1873. At the time, Johann Salvator was serving as a lieutenant colonel of artillery in the Timișoara garrison and became both the owner of the property and a temporary resident. In 1874, he published in Timișoara a treatise entitled Reflections on the organization of the Austrian artillery, which provoked considerable controversy. As a result, the Archduke was placed under house arrest. On 16 February 1875, by imperial decree, he was transferred as a disciplinary measure to Infantry Regiment No. 12 in Kraków. Nevertheless, only a year later, he was appointed commander of Infantry Regiment No. 9.

In 1889, after the suicide of his friend and cousin, Crown Prince Rudolf, Archduke Johann Salvator of Austria fell into a period of depression. During an exhibition in Paris, he announced to the press his intention to renounce all noble titles and adopt the name Johann (John) Orth, after his Austrian castle. By the end of that year, he was formally stricken from the genealogical records of the House of Habsburg.

In 1890, Johann Orth purchased a merchant ship and embarked on a voyage to South America, disappearing without a trace during a severe storm at sea. The incident drew international attention when it emerged that Ludmilla (Milly) Hildegard Steubel, a celebrated dancer at the Vienna State Opera and his childhood sweetheart, had also been aboard. It is believed that the couple had married in secret shortly before setting sail.

At the turn of the 19th to the 20th century, the building underwent several changes of ownership. Among its proprietors was Illés Herczl, while Alajos Lenz ran a public bath on the ground floor. Over time, the house also accommodated notable residents, including Beatrix Küttel, the widow of Mayor Károly (Karl) Küttel, who spent her final years there.

== Architecture ==
The two-story building, constructed around 1870 by Josef Kunz in the late-classical style, exemplified the architecture of its era. It marked a significant innovation in the neighborhood, being among the first two-story structures in the district.

Over the years, the building has largely preserved its original appearance, though certain modifications were made to accommodate the needs and tastes of its owners. Initially, four decorative statues adorned the area above the cornice, but these have gradually disappeared.
