= Andrei Șaguna Bridge, Timișoara =

Andrei Șaguna Bridge Podul Andrei Șaguna
- Coordinates: 45°45′35″N 21°15′31″E
- Carries: Trams, motor vehicles, pedestrians, bicycles
- Crosses: Bega Canal
- Locale: Timișoara, Romania
- Other name(s): Mill Market Bridge; Michael the Brave Bridge
- Preceded by: Dacians' Bridge

Characteristics
- Material: Reinforced concrete
- Width: 10 m (33 ft)
- Longest span: 31 m (102 ft)
- No. of spans: 3

History
- Architect: Rezső Hikisch (old bridge)
- Engineering design by: Aladár Kovács-Sebestény (old bridge); Radu Marinov (new bridge)
- Constructed by: Magyar Beton és Vasbeton Építési Vállalat (old bridge); IPROTIM (new bridge)
- Built: 1909
- Rebuilt: 1980

Andrei Șaguna Bridge (Romanian: Podul Andrei Șaguna), formerly Michael the Brave Bridge, is the name of a bridge in the western Romanian city of Timișoara. It crosses the Bega River at Sarmizegetusa Square and is one of three bridges in Fabric district. Until 1919, it was known as Malom-téri híd, then for five years as Podul din Piața Morii (Mill Market Bridge). In both cases, the name was derived from the former name of Sarmizegetusa Square.

== History ==
The Bega River once had several branches in Fabric, where many watermills operated. To maximize the use of water power, the city council decided in 1902 to construct the Timișoara Hydroelectric Power Station and simultaneously shut down the watermills. The systematization plan, designed by engineer László Szesztay between 1901 and 1903, proposed straightening the Bega River over a span of 2.4 kilometers. Along this stretch, three new bridges were built: at what is now Sarmizegetusa Square, at Badea Cârțan Market, and at the site of what would later become Neptune Public Bath.

=== Old bridge ===
The construction of the bridges was put up for public tender, with fourteen applications received from companies based in Budapest, Timișoara, and Arad. The contract for the bridge discussed here was awarded to the Budapest firm Magyar Beton és Vasbeton Építési Vállalat. The contracts were signed in the spring of 1908, and the construction was overseen by the Budapest office of Aladár Kovács-Sebestény.

Aladár Kovács-Sebestény was a highly regarded hydraulic engineer. After studying at the Swiss Federal Institute of Technology in Zurich, he moved to Timișoara, where he became the head of the Water Regulation Commission. He developed the projects for the regulation of the Bega and Timiș rivers, as well as for the construction of dams. He also collaborated with Ludwig von Ybl to create the city's first urban planning system.

The bridge's architect was Rezső Hikisch, also from Budapest. To prepare for the project, he made several study trips to Budapest, Dresden, and Munich.

The four reliefs at the bridgeheads were sculpted by Timișoara artist Nándor Gallas and represent the following figures:

- a female figure holding the city coat of arms,
- a tanner working with hide,
- a miller carrying a sack, and
- a sander loading a boat.

The city engineers Emil Szilárd and Stan Vidrighin were responsible for the project's design. The bridge was completed in 1909 and has been used by the Timișoara tram service since 1930, when the new tram section between Sarmizegetusa Square and Victor Babeș Hospital was opened.

=== New bridge ===
The bridge showed the effects of time, with visible signs of aging and wear. In 1970–1971, the Timișoara Design Institute (IPROTIM) was tasked with assessing its condition, revealing significant damage. By 1980, the bridge was demolished and replaced with a new reinforced concrete structure. The new bridge was constructed by IPROTIM under the leadership of engineer Radu Marinov.

The new bridge featured a central span of 31 meters, with two side openings of 9.3 meters each. The roadway measured seven meters in width, and each of the two pedestrian walkways was three meters wide. Additionally, the four reliefs, which had been temporarily housed in the Banat Museum, were relocated to the ends of the new bridge.
