= Fabric Greek Catholic Church =

Church in Fabric, Timișoara, Romania

Church of the Nativity of Mary
- Biserica „Nașterea Maicii Domnului”
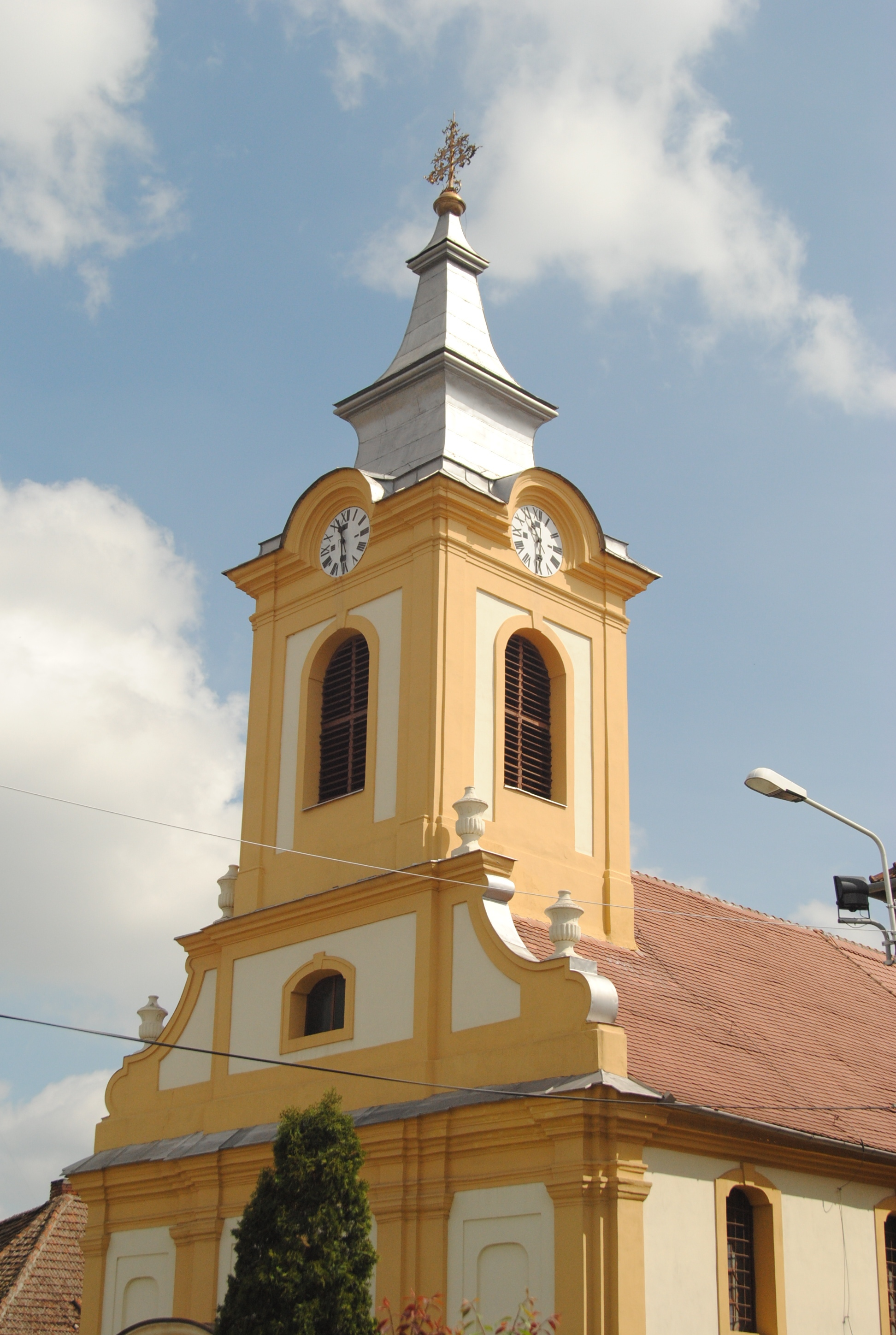

Religion
- Affiliation: Greek Catholic
- Ownership: Eparchy of Lugoj
- Patron: Nativity of Mary
- Year consecrated: 1771
- Status: Active

Location
- Location: Metropolitan Alexandru Sterca-Suluțiu Square, Timișoara
- Interactive map of Church of the Nativity of Mary
- Coordinates: 45°45′16″N 21°15′2″E

Architecture
- Style: Austrian Baroque
- Groundbreaking: 1764
- Completed: 1765

The Church of the Nativity of Mary is a Greek Catholic church in the Fabric district of Timișoara. The church was originally Roman Catholic, then from 1906 Greek Catholic, from 1948 Orthodox, and from 1991 again Greek Catholic.

== History ==
The church was built between 1764 and 1765 in the Austrian Baroque style. It was originally a Roman Catholic church, but with the construction of the new Roman Catholic church in Romans' Square (1906), it was donated to the Greek Catholic parish in the Fabric district. Following its renovation and redevelopment to better serve its new purpose, it was consecrated on 26 November 1906, by Vasile Hossu, the Greek Catholic bishop of Lugoj.

The liturgical tasks were initially performed, until 1780, by Franciscan monks, later being taken over by the priests of the diocese of Cenad. Following the decree of the government of Petru Groza, in 1948, the Greek Catholic Church was abolished, and the place became Orthodox. In 1991 it was returned to the Greek Catholic Church.

== Architecture ==
The church building, built in the Austrian Baroque style, is erected in a rectangular plan, with a horseshoe-shaped apse. In its western part, the short tower stands out, with the helmet covered with tin, which marks the axis of the gate. Overlapping pilasters separate the facade into four axes. The church gate has a carved stone frame. In the 20th century, a portico with an arched roof, supported on columns, was erected in front of the gate. The trapezoidal arch of the frame bears the inscription Maria and the year of construction: 1765.

The original pulpit, in white and gold, is kept almost intact inside. The painting of the iconostasis, by the painter Virgil Simonescu between 1910 and 1920, is also impressive. The interior painting of the church was made in the 1990s by the Millthaler brothers from Timișoara.
