= Decebalus Bridge, Timișoara =

Decebalus Bridge Podul Decebal
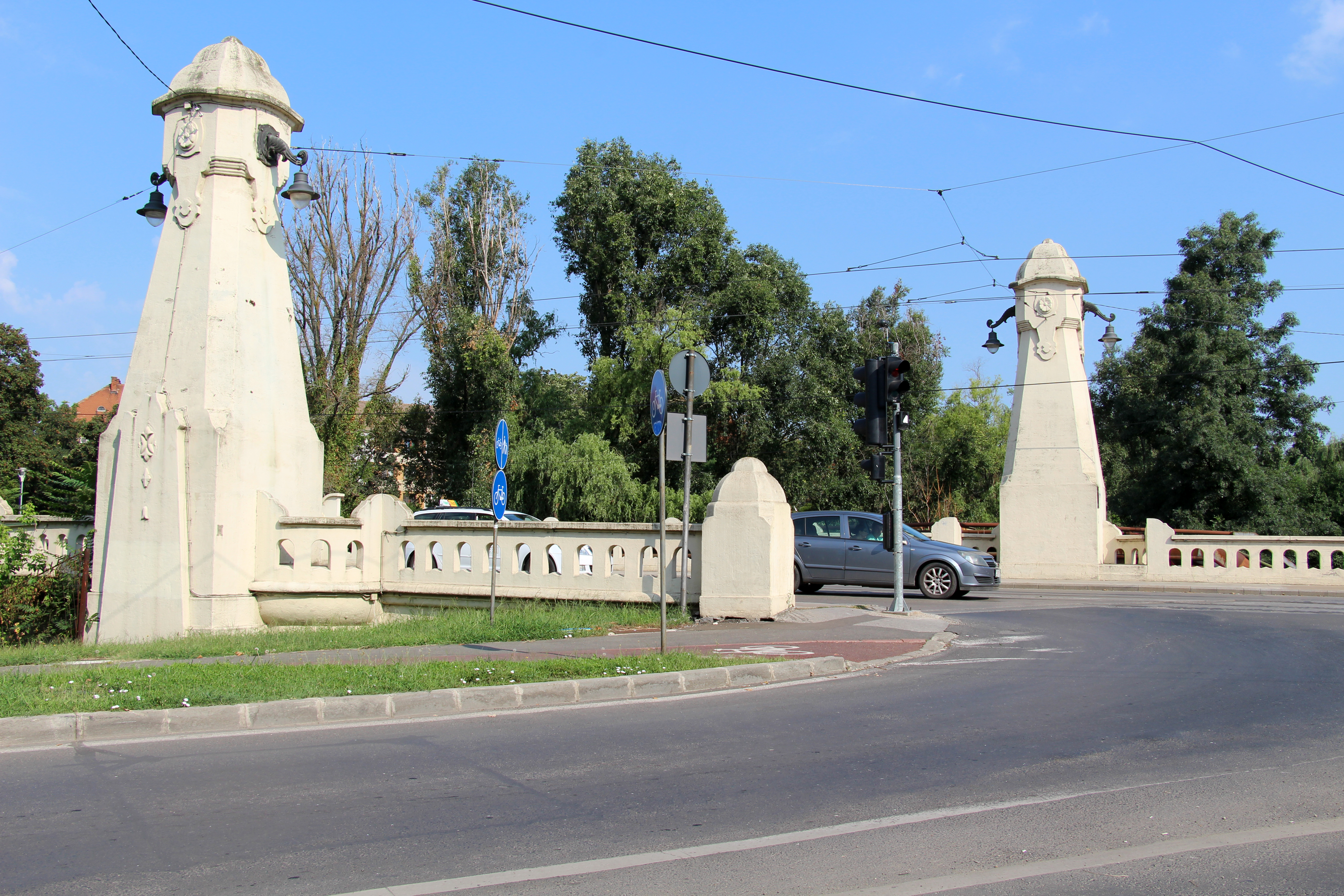
- Coordinates: 45°45′21″N 21°14′27″E
- Carries: Trams, motor vehicles, pedestrians, bicycles
- Crosses: Bega Canal
- Locale: Timișoara, Romania
- Other name(s): Queen Marie Bridge; Neptune Bridge
- Preceded by: Michelangelo Bridge
- Followed by: Dacians' Bridge

Characteristics
- Material: Reinforced concrete
- Total length: 195 m (640 ft)
- Width: 9 m (30 ft)
- No. of spans: 2

History
- Architect: Albert Körössy
- Engineering design by: Győző Mihailich
- Constructed by: Péter Melocco
- Opened: 1909

The Decebalus Bridge (Romanian: Podul Decebal) is located in the western Romanian city of Timișoara, spanning the Bega River. It is one of three bridges in the Fabric district, linking it to the inner-city district of Cetate. The eastern end of the bridge is situated between the Neptune Baths and the entrance to Queen Marie Park. It is named after the Dacian king Decebalus.

== Name ==
During the Kingdom of Hungary, the bridge was originally known as Liget-úti híd, named after the nearby street, Liget-út (Park Street). Alternative names used less frequently during this time included Korona híd (Crown Bridge) among the Hungarian population and Parkbrücke (Park Bridge) among the German-speaking residents.

After Timișoara was incorporated into Romania in 1919, the bridge became known during the interwar period as Podul de pe Aleea Parcului (Park Alley Bridge). This name was derived from the nearby street, Aleea Parcului, which had previously been called Liget-út. A few years after Aleea Parcului was renamed Queen Marie Boulevard, the bridge was also renamed Queen Marie Bridge, in honor of Marie of Edinburgh, Queen of Romania from 1914 to 1938.

The official name, Decebalus Bridge, was established after World War II. Another commonly used name is Neptune Bridge, which comes from its proximity to the Neptune Baths or Neptune Palace. On 26 May 2016, local councilors unanimously decided to rename Decebalus Bridge to Trajan Bridge, since it is located on the road leading to the area of the same name. However, several organizations representing the 1989 revolutionaries protested the change, prompting the decision to revert to the bridge's original name.

== History ==
The Bega River once had several branches in the Fabric district, where many watermills operated. In 1902, to optimize the use of water power, the city council decided to construct the Timișoara Hydroelectric Power Station and shut down the watermills. The systematization plan, created by engineer László Szesztay between 1901 and 1903, involved straightening the Bega River over a span of 2.4 kilometers. Three new bridges were built along this section: Andrei Șaguna Bridge (originally named Malom-téri híd in Hungarian), Dacians' Bridge (Széna-téri híd in Hungarian), and Decebalus Bridge (Liget-úti híd in Hungarian). The original forms of the first two bridges can only be seen in photos, as they were demolished and rebuilt. The Andrei Șaguna Bridge was reconstructed in 1981, and the Dacians' Bridge was rebuilt in 1989, with only the bas-reliefs from the original structures remaining.

The construction of the bridges was open to public tender, with fourteen bids submitted by companies from Budapest, Timișoara, and Arad. The contract for the Decebalus Bridge was awarded to the Budapest-based company Péter Melocco. The bridge was finished in 1909, and the Timișoara tram system has been operating on it since 5 August of that year.

== Construction ==
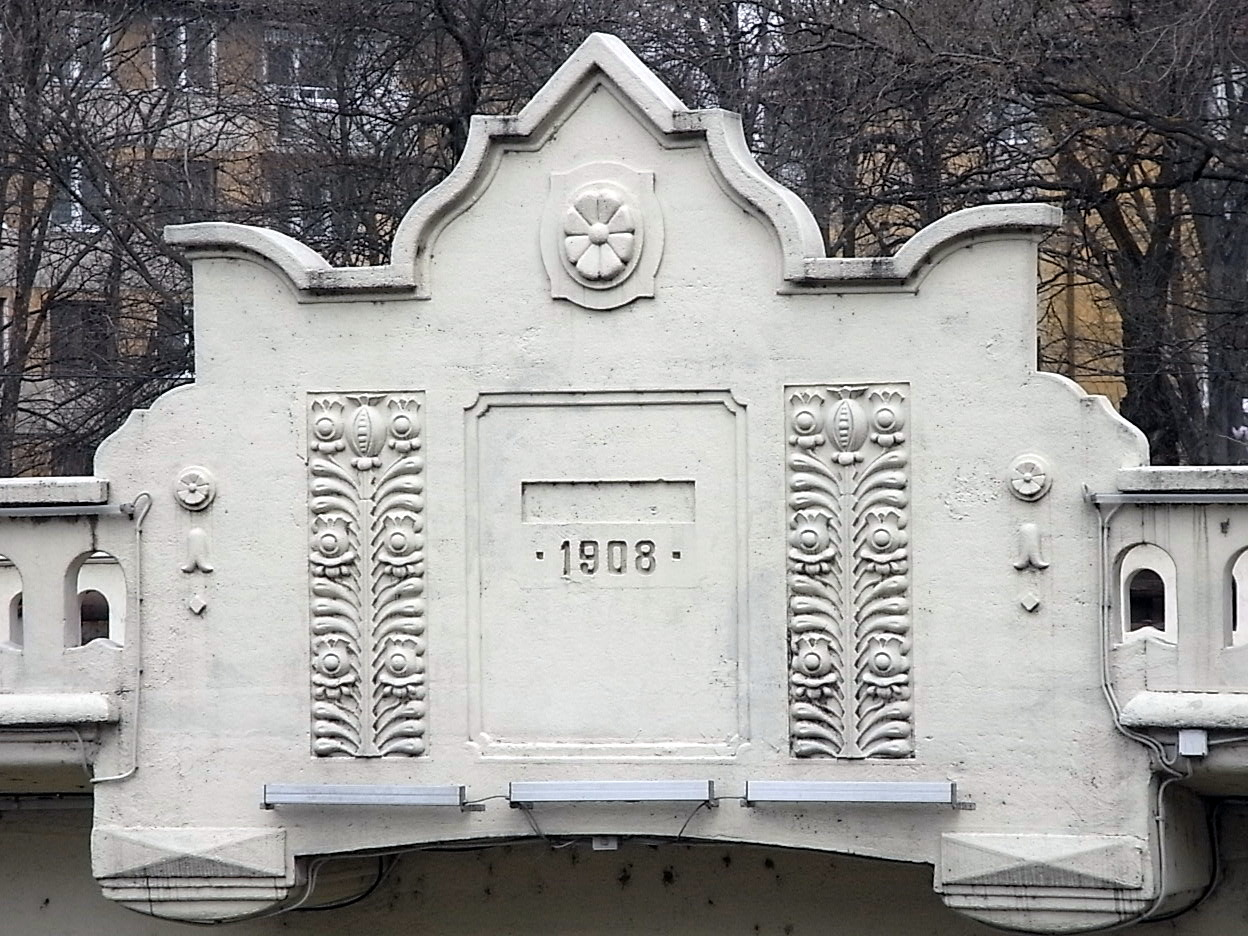
The year of construction inscribed on the bridge

The Decebalus Bridge's construction traces back to Győző Mihailich, a graduate of the Technical University in Budapest, who gained recognition for his work in building concrete bridges. The architect responsible for the project was Albert Körössy, who studied at both the Technical University in Budapest and the École des Beaux-Arts in Paris and Munich.

Due to the Local Council's strict requirements for integrating bridges into the environment, which limited construction height, and the significant width of the Bega Canal, an innovative solution was necessary to meet all the imposed parameters. In this case, reinforced concrete beams were chosen as the solution. At the time, this approach was considered bold, as no bridges with such a span had been built using reinforced concrete beams. Győző Mihailich addressed the challenge by utilizing seven articulated beams with three spans, effectively reducing the high bending stresses in the central span. The end supports were designed as piles, with the two end spans embedded in the slope. This design eliminated the need for traditional buttresses, resulting in significant cost savings. Regarding these plans, the municipal engineering service wrote that "it is a bold, but completely justified, arch-shaped solution, which we believe we will find in accordance with the approval of most specialized persons – if we consider the arch solution the best from a technical point of view of all those presented."

The bridge's load test took place between 11 and 13 May 1909, when the bridge was loaded with stone cubes.

The bridge was awarded an honorary diploma at the International Exhibition in Paris in 1910. With a length of 195 meters and a width of nine meters, the Decebalus Bridge was the largest concrete bridge in Europe at the time of its completion.

Prior to the regularization and excavation of the Bega Canal, near this location was the raft canal, which was crossed by a wooden bridge.

== Trivia ==
During the 1989 Romanian Revolution, security forces opened fire on demonstrators at the Decebalus Bridge after 5 p.m. on 17 December. Over the next few hours, 65 people were killed and nearly 200 injured.
