= Dacians' Bridge, Timișoara =

Dacians' Bridge Podul Dacilor
- Coordinates: 45°45′37″N 21°14′55″E
- Carries: Trams, motor vehicles, pedestrians, bicycles
- Crosses: Bega Canal
- Locale: Timișoara, Romania
- Preceded by: Decebalus Bridge
- Followed by: Andrei Șaguna Bridge

Characteristics
- Material: Reinforced concrete
- Width: 10.8 m (35 ft)
- Longest span: 31.36 m (103 ft)
- No. of spans: 3

History
- Architect: Rezső Hikisch (old bridge)
- Engineering design by: Aladár Kovács-Sebestény (old bridge); Radu Marinov (new bridge)
- Constructed by: Magyar Beton és Vasbeton Építési Vállalat (old bridge); Căile Ferate Române (new bridge)
- Built: 1909
- Rebuilt: 1988

The Dacians' Bridge (Romanian: Podul Dacilor) is the name of a bridge in the western Romanian city of Timișoara. It crosses the Bega River at Badea Cârțan Market and is one of three bridges in Fabric district. Until 1919, it was called Széna-téri híd, then for five years as Podul din Piața de Fân, meaning Hay Market Bridge. In both cases, the name was derived from the former name of Badea Cârțan Market.

== History ==
The Bega River once had multiple branches in Fabric, where numerous watermills were in operation. In 1902, the city council decided to construct the Timișoara Hydroelectric Power Station to better harness the river's water power, which led to the closure of the watermills. Engineer László Szesztay's systematization plan, developed between 1901 and 1903, proposed straightening the Bega River over a stretch of 2.4 kilometers. During this project, three new bridges were built: one at today's Sarmizegetusa Square, another at today's Badea Cârțan Market, and a third at what would later become Neptune Public Bath.

=== Old bridge ===
The construction of the bridges was put up for public tender, receiving fourteen applications from companies in Budapest, Timișoara, and Arad. The contract for the bridge in question was awarded to the Budapest-based company Magyar Beton és Vasbeton Építési Vállalat. The contracts were signed in the spring of 1908, and the responsibility for the bridge's construction fell to the Budapest office of Aladár Kovács-Sebestény.

Aladár Kovács-Sebestény was a highly regarded hydraulic engineer. After finishing his studies at the Swiss Federal Institute of Technology in Zurich, he moved to Timișoara, where he became the head of the Water Regulation Commission. He was responsible for the development of the Bega and Timiș rivers' regularization project, along with plans for dam construction. Additionally, in collaboration with Ludwig von Ybl, he worked on the city's first systematization plan.

The bridge's architect was Rezső Hikisch from Budapest. In preparation for construction, he made several study trips to Budapest, Dresden, and Munich. Engineers Emil Szilárd and Stan Vidrighin were responsible for the project on behalf of the city. The bridge was completed in 1909.

Technical data indicates that the Hay Market Bridge's static system consisted of a continuous beam supported by multiple piers and spanning three sections. The primary reinforcement was made of reinforced concrete. 30 meters wide, the central span was visible to viewers, while the outer spans were submerged beneath the embankment.

The calculation was based on a useful load of 20 tons. Freight trains also operated on the Hay Market Bridge (part of the tram line), traveling to and from the factories in the Fabric district (Beer Factory).

=== New bridge ===
The passage of time left its mark on the bridge, showing visible signs of aging and wear. In 1970–1971, the Timișoara Design Institute (IPROTIM) was tasked with inspecting the bridge, uncovering significant damage. This prompted the suspension of freight traffic on the Timișoara tramway.

In 1988, eight years after the nearby Andrei Șaguna Bridge, the Dacians' Bridge was demolished and replaced with a reinforced concrete structure. Tram service on the Trajan Square–Take Ionescu Boulevard line was temporarily halted, and private motor traffic was rerouted over the Andrei Șaguna Bridge.

The new bridge features a central opening measuring 31.36 meters, with two side openings, each 8.26 meters wide. The roadway spans 7.8 meters, and the sidewalks are each three meters wide.

Similar to the Andrei Șaguna Bridge, the new bridge was constructed by IPROTIM under the supervision of engineer Radu Marinov. Born in Miercurea Ciuc in 1936, Marinov graduated from C. D. Loga High School in Timișoara in 1954 before pursuing civil engineering at the Timișoara Polytechnic Institute, where he completed his studies in 1959.

The construction work was carried out by the Romanian state railway Căile Ferate Române.
