= Iosefin Roman Catholic Church =

Church in Iosefin, Timișoara, Romania

Church of the Nativity of Mary
- Biserica „Nașterea Fecioarei Maria”
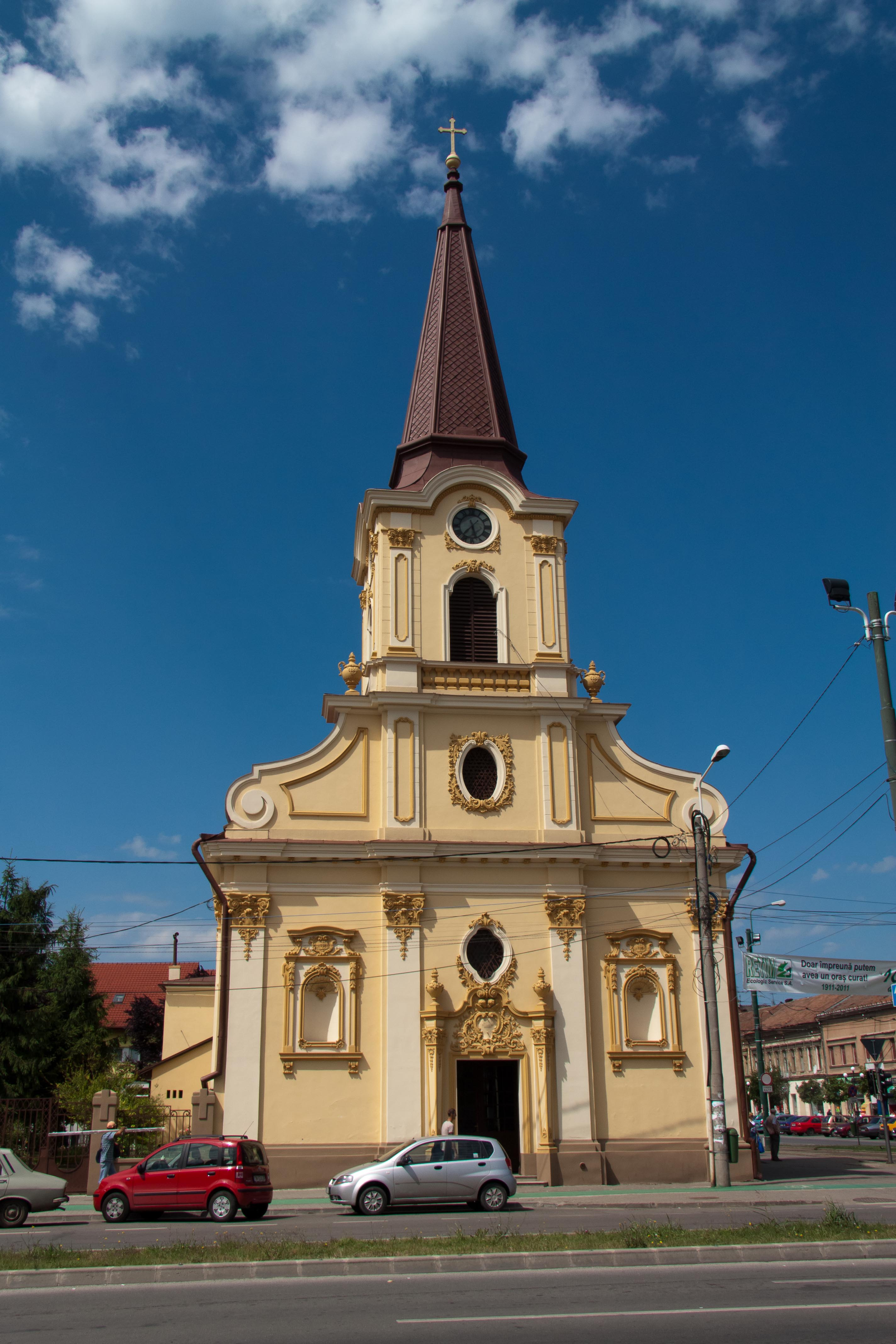

Religion
- Affiliation: Roman Catholic
- Patron: Nativity of Mary
- Year consecrated: 1775
- Status: Active

Location
- Location: 13 General Ion Dragalina Boulevard, Timișoara
- Interactive map of Church of the Nativity of Mary
- Coordinates: 45°44′40″N 21°12′39″E

Architecture
- Style: Baroque
- Groundbreaking: 1772
- Completed: 1774

Website
- sanctamariaiosefin.ro

The Church of the Nativity of Mary is a Roman Catholic church in the Iosefin district of Timișoara. It was built between 1772 and 1774 in Baroque style.

== History ==
The Roman Catholic parish in the Iosefin district was established in 1775 after Timișoara was liberated from Ottoman rule. Other districts of the city also belonged to the Iosefin parish at that time, such as Elisabetin, Mehala and Ronaț. All these have become independent parishes over time.

The Roman Catholic church in the Iosefin district is the oldest church in the city after the Roman Catholic Dome in Union Square and the predecessor of today's Piarist Church. It was built between 1772 and 1774 in the Baroque style and consecrated in December 1775 by Leonhardus Rothenbach on behalf of the bishop of the Diocese of Cenad, Franz Anton Engl von Wagrain. The church was erected in honor of the Nativity of Mary, the patron saint being celebrated on 8 September.

The tower, damaged during the siege of 1849, was renovated in 1861 by architect Johann von Schuster. The church dominated the surrounding buildings as long as Iosefin had a rural look. The houses had a short facade with a pediment facing the street and a long facade on one side of the plot in the yard, as in the plain villages of Banat. After Iosefin began to develop rapidly after the connection of Timișoara to the Central European railway system, the Baroque tower of the church seemed too short. That is why in 1889 the sharp spire of the tower was built, which still exists today and which gives the church an unusual slenderness for Baroque buildings. The tower clock was the first and until 1838 the only public clock in the district. The bells of the church were cast in November 1923 in Antal Novotny's workshop.

== Architecture ==
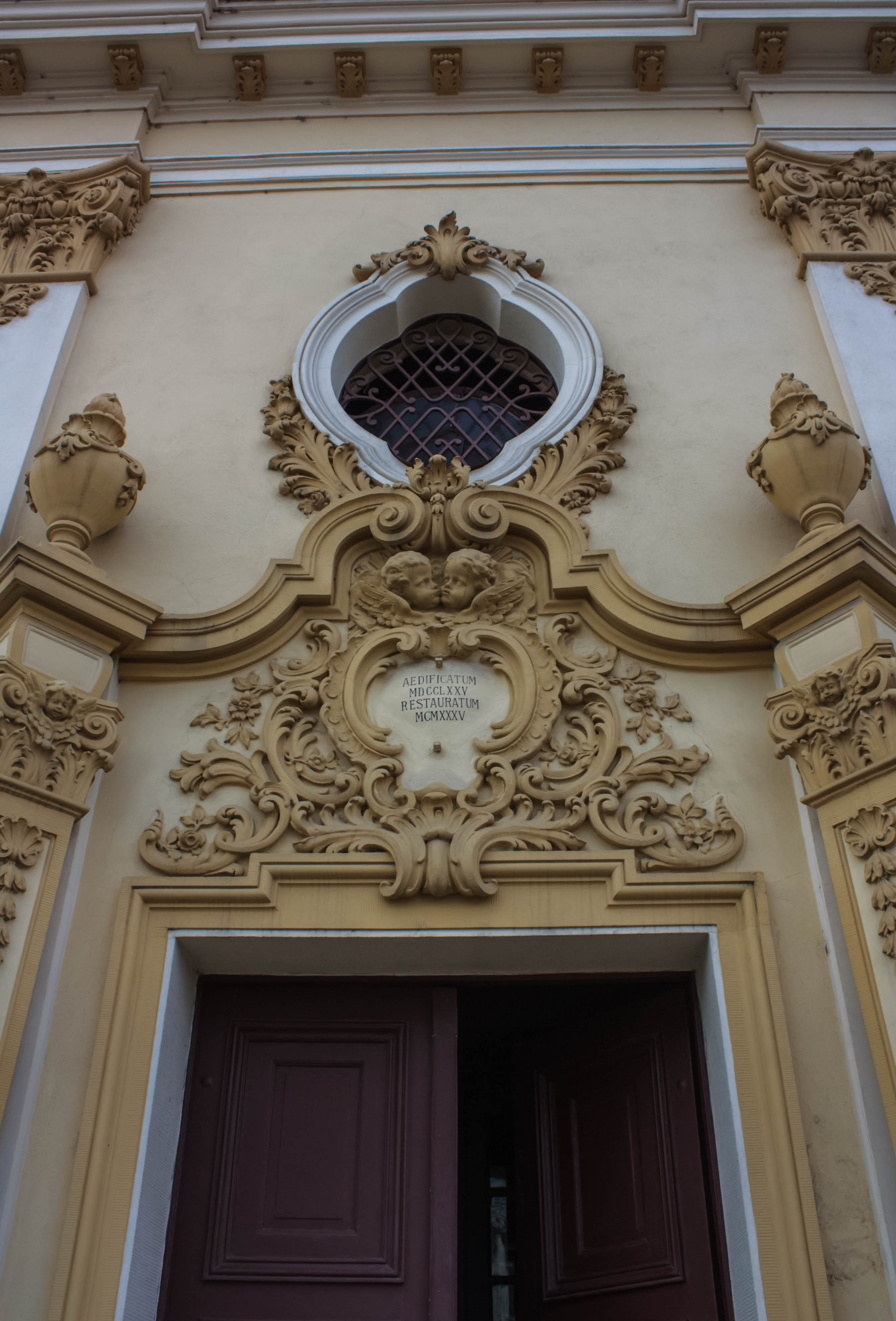
Architectural details of the entrance

The architects of the parish church are not known and it is assumed that they were of Viennese origin and were in the service of the Treasury. The building is relatively small, with a sturdy tower, in mature Baroque style with some Rococo details. Decorations with plant motifs can be seen on the facade. From 1932 until 2013, the oldest stone statue of John of Nepomuk, made in 1723, which is also the oldest monument in the city, was located in the courtyard of the church; it was restored and relocated in front of the Millennium Church in Fabric district.

On the Baroque main altar from 1935, made by László Szántó, there is a portrait of the Virgin Mary from the late 18th century. The benches are by the same artist. The two wooden statues on either side of the main altar, representing Saint Joachim and Saint Anne, date before 1778. The two side altars, in Baroque style, were made in honor of Francis of Assisi and Saint Anne. The third altar, in Romanesque style, dates from 1895 and was dedicated to the devotion to the Sacred Heart of Jesus.
