= Ștefania Palace =

- Palatul Ștefania
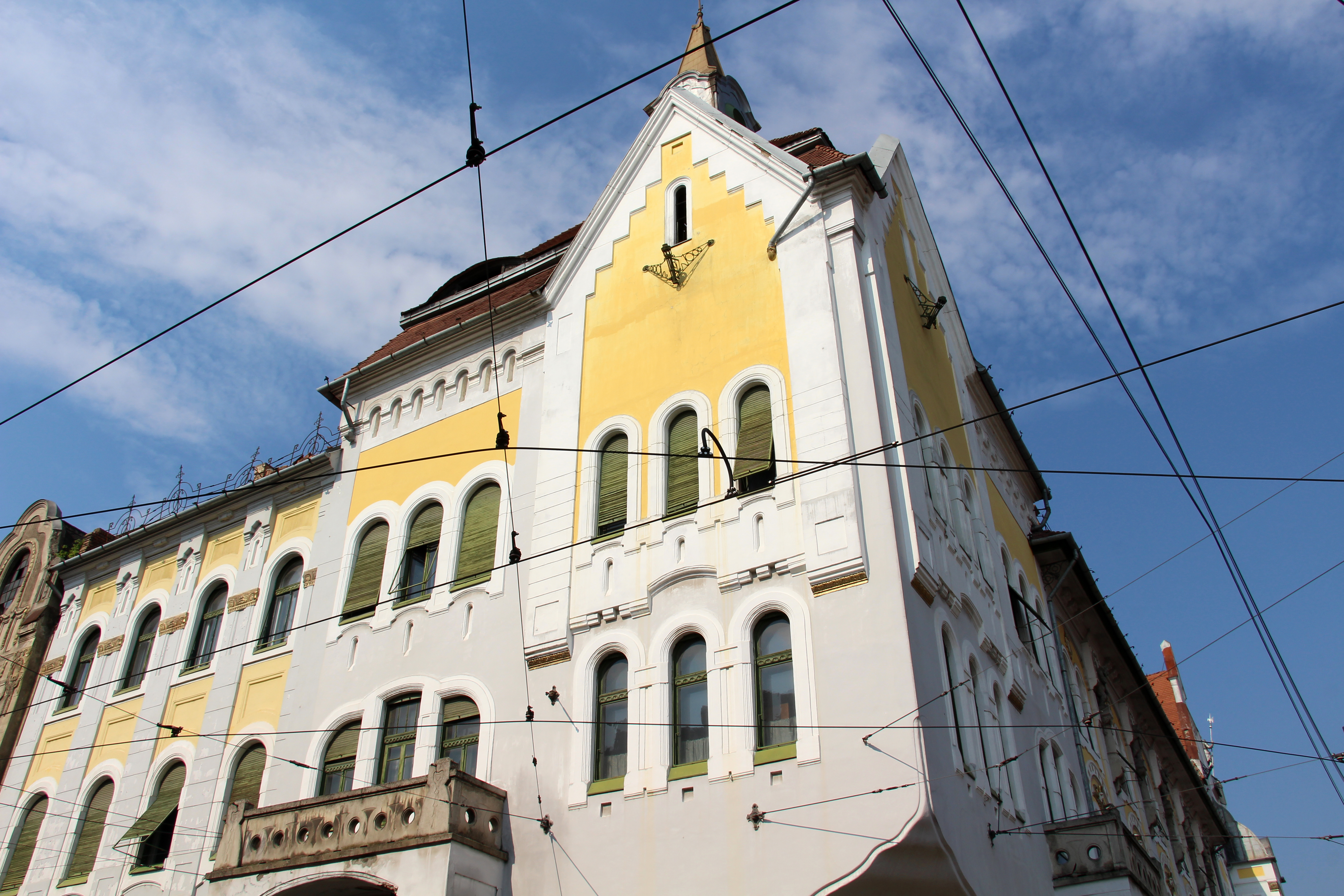
- Former names: Totisz Palace
- Alternative names: House with Monkeys

General information
- Architectural style: Secession
- Location: Timișoara, Romania
- Coordinates: 45°45′26″N 21°14′55″E
- Construction started: 1908
- Completed: 1909

Technical details
- Floor count: 3

Design and construction
- Architect: László Székely
- Main contractor: Josef Kremmer, Sr.

The Ștefania Palace (Romanian: Palatul Ștefania), formerly known as Totisz Palace and popularly referred to as the House with Monkeys, is a landmark building in the Fabric district of Timișoara, a city in western Romania. The palace occupies the entire northern frontage of the block bordered by Stephen the Great Street, 3 August 1919 Boulevard, and Romans' Square.

The building is part of the Fabric (I) urban ensemble, designated as a historical monument under LMI code TM-II-s-B-06096 (covering the frontage on Stephen the Great Street), and the Fabric (II) urban ensemble, listed as a historical monument under LMI code TM-II-s-B-06097 (covering the frontage on Romans' Square).

== History ==
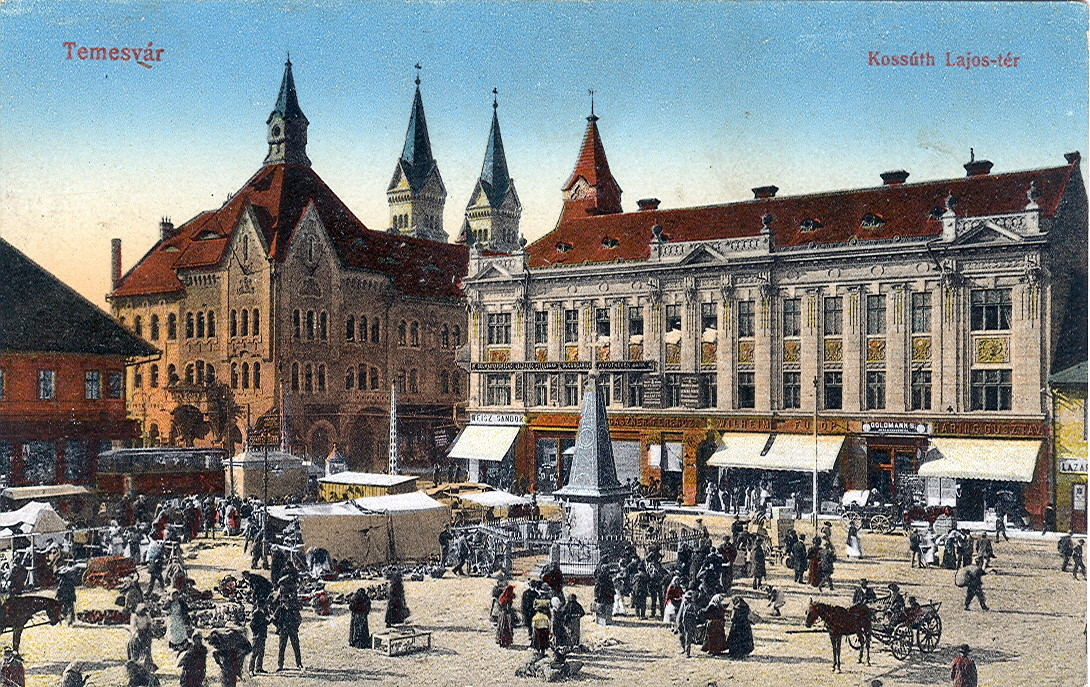
Ștefania Palace and Lajos Kossuth Square (present-day Trajan Square) around 1914

In the early 1900s, the site of the present-day building was occupied by the houses of widow Júlia Risztics and Sándor Sigmund. Due to the need to widen 3 August 1919 Boulevard (formerly Andrássy út), the Timișoara City Hall decided to purchase these properties following a municipal council meeting on 29 December 1902. The agreed sums were 140,000 kr. for the Risztics property, with an obligation to pay an annual rent of 1,400 kr. to the widow, and 70,000 kr. for the Sigmund House. The acquired properties remained under municipal ownership until early 1908, during which time they were rented out to cover interest costs. Widow Júlia Risztics died just days after the contract was signed, leading to the cessation of the 1,400 kr. annual rent payments.

The widening of Andrássy Street (now 3 August 1919 Boulevard) took place between June 1908 and August 1909. Following the demolition of the Risztics and Sigmund houses, the street was expanded from 11 meters to 18 meters, and Coronini Square was established over an area of 274 square fathoms. On the remaining land, a two-story report house was constructed for the social assistance fund. The building was designed by László Székely, the chief architect of Timișoara, and constructed between 1908 and 1909 by contractor Josef Kremmer Sr.

The Ștefania Palace was originally constructed as a "report house," a term referring to a building with rental apartments. The revenue generated from these rentals was used to financially support the City Asylum.

The Geselligkeitsklub (Fabric Society Club) operated on the first floor of the building. During World War I, the club ceded its space to accommodate the Girls' Commercial High School. Additionally, on the second floor, two apartments were repurposed to house the Boys' Commercial High School.

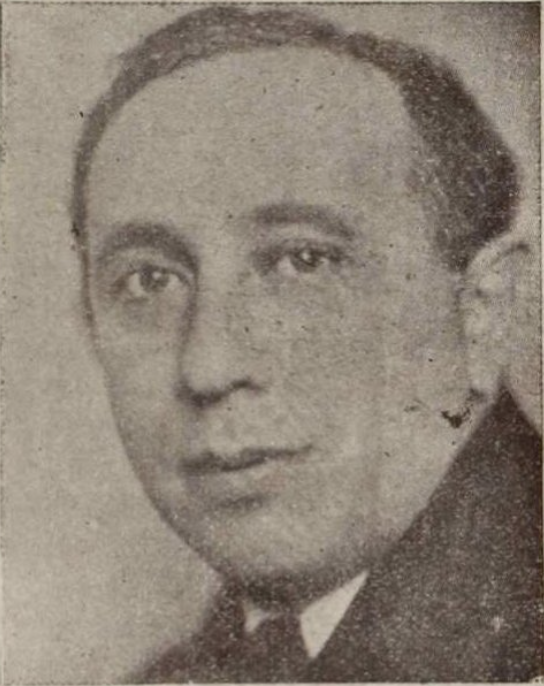
Rudolf (Rezső) Totisz

The building received its current name in 1918, when it was sold to Rudolf Totis (Rezső Totisz), the general director of Industria Lânii S.A. and later Consul of Belgium in Timișoara. Totis renamed the building Ștefania Palace in honor of his wife.

During the interwar period, Ștefania Palace became a renowned entertainment hub, housing numerous restaurants, bars, and cafés. On the ground floor, the well-known restaurant Carul cu Bere operated alongside the Citizens' Club of the Fabric district.

In addition to its entertainment venues, Ștefania Palace hosted various businesses for many years. Notable establishments included the Dénes & Pollak textile and haberdashery store, the Spierer perfumery, and the Schwartz shoe store. Furthermore, a branch of the Bank of Timișoara operated on the first floor, with Zsigmond Szana serving as its director.

In 1944, an almost decade-long legal dispute over the building was noted between the Totisz family, who had settled in Buenos Aires, and the Timișoara City Hall. The case was ultimately decided in favor of the municipality.

Between 2000 and 2002, the building underwent restoration and an attic expansion, based on a project designed by architects Hortensia and Mihai Botescu. Today, one of the spaces owned by Timișoara City Hall within Ștefania Palace houses the Coordination Center for the Rehabilitation of Historic Districts of Timișoara.

== Architecture ==
Ștefania Palace features large, high roofs reminiscent of medieval towers, characteristic of Gothic architecture, with narrow, rounded windows framed by green woodwork. These elements contrast beautifully with the building's facades, painted in white and yellow. One of the towers is adorned with a unique decoration—a halberdier in armor.

The building's decorations, including golden scrolls and geometric shapes, are typical of the Secession style, with asymmetry often employed as a stylistic feature. For instance, the two towers are dissimilar in design and volume. Additionally, beneath the cornice on the upper part of the second floor, statues of bears and gorillas are displayed, which has led to the building being popularly known as the House with Monkeys.

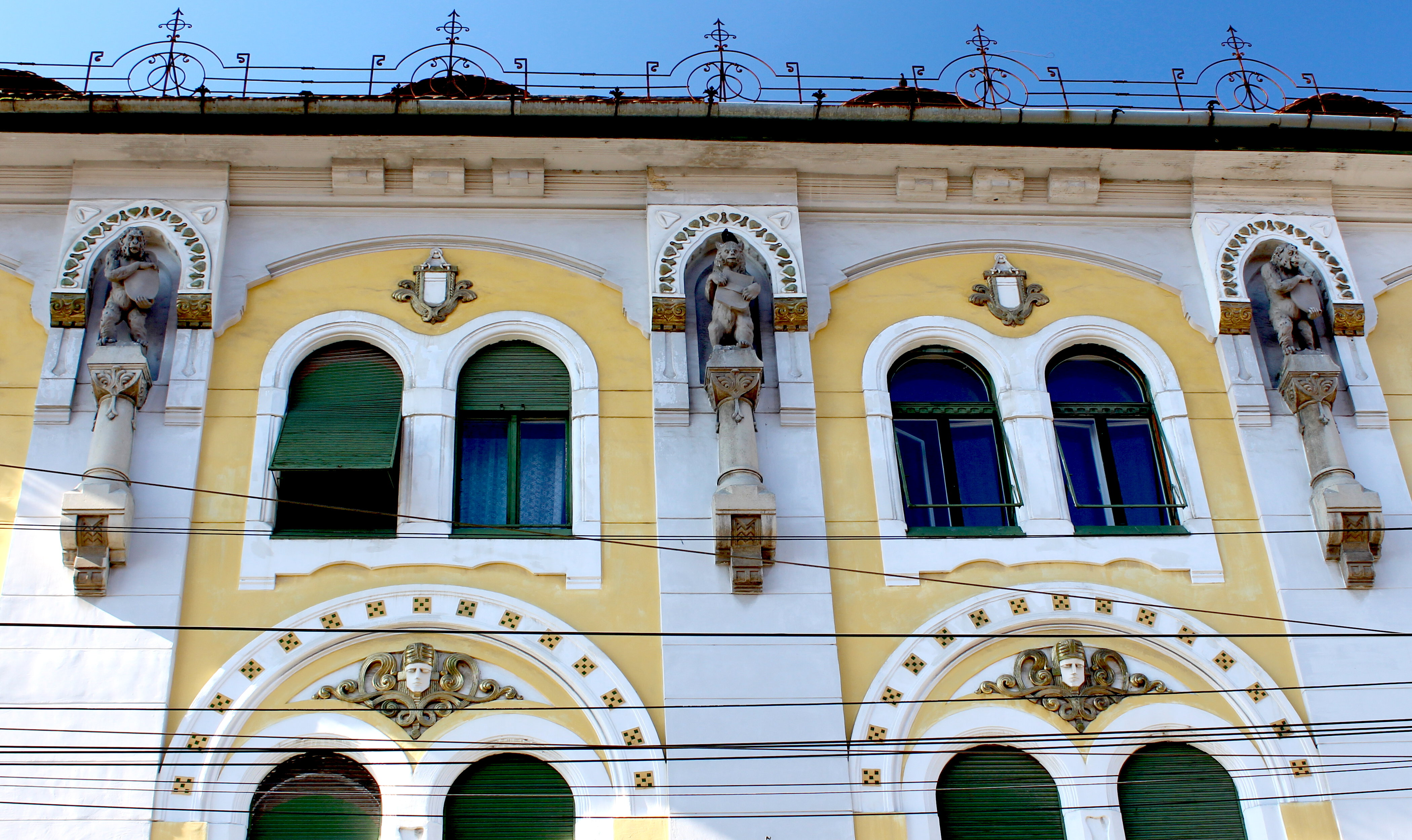
The decorations with bears and gorillas

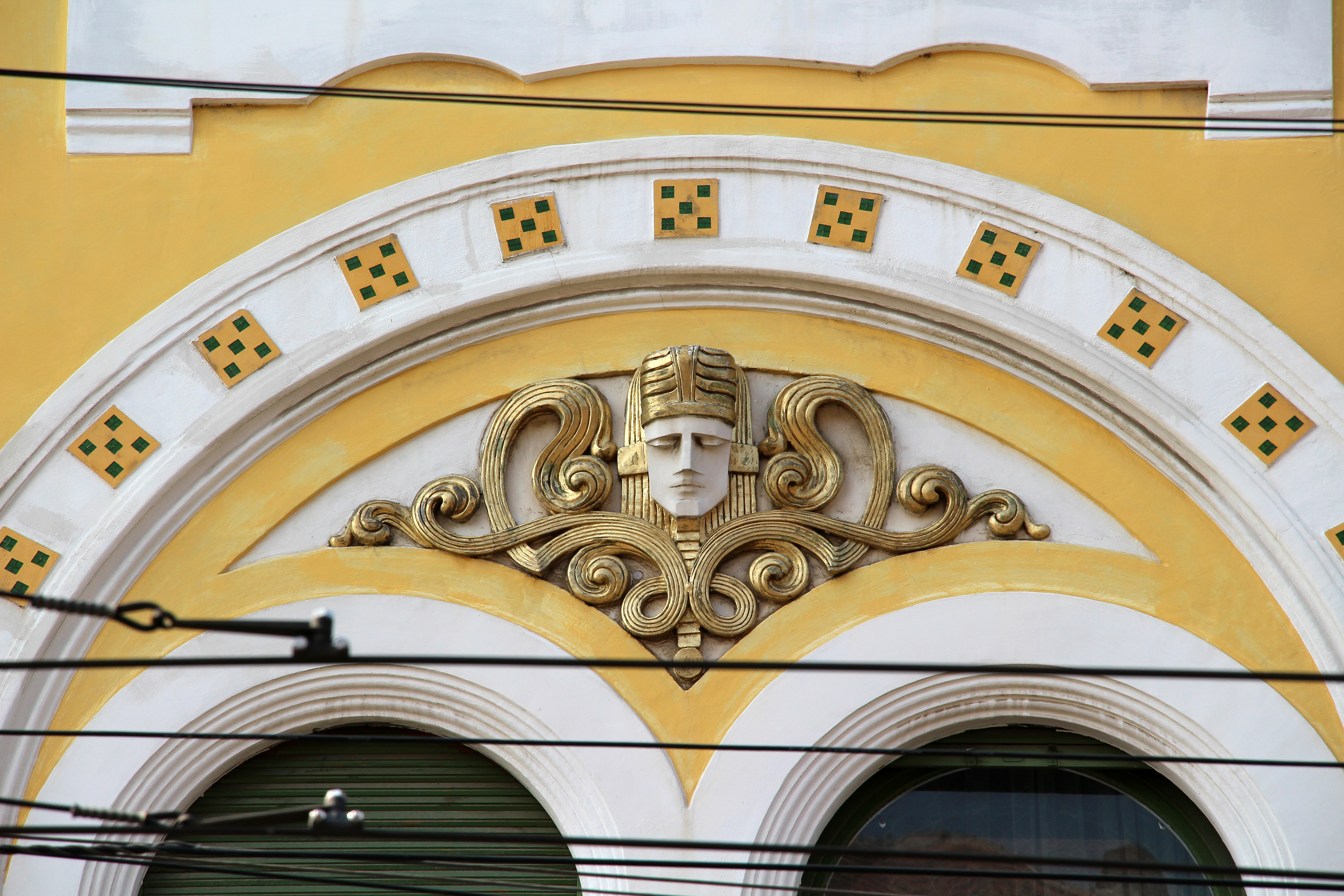
A mascaron above one of the windows

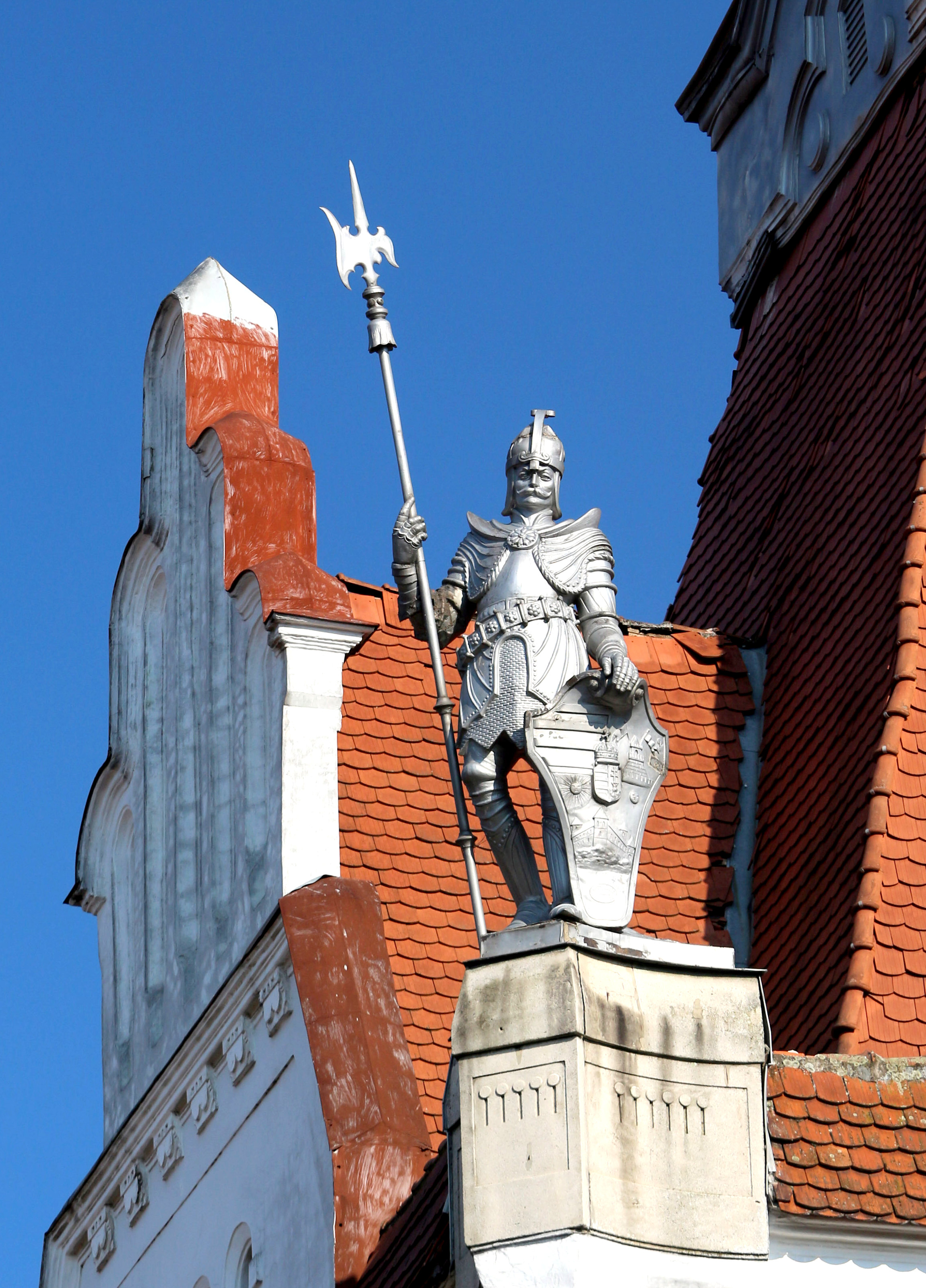
The halberdier
