= Millennium Church =

Church building in Fabric, Timișoara, Romania

- Biserica Millennium (Romanian); Milleniumi templom (Hungarian); Millenniumskirche (German); Chiesa del Millennio (Italian)
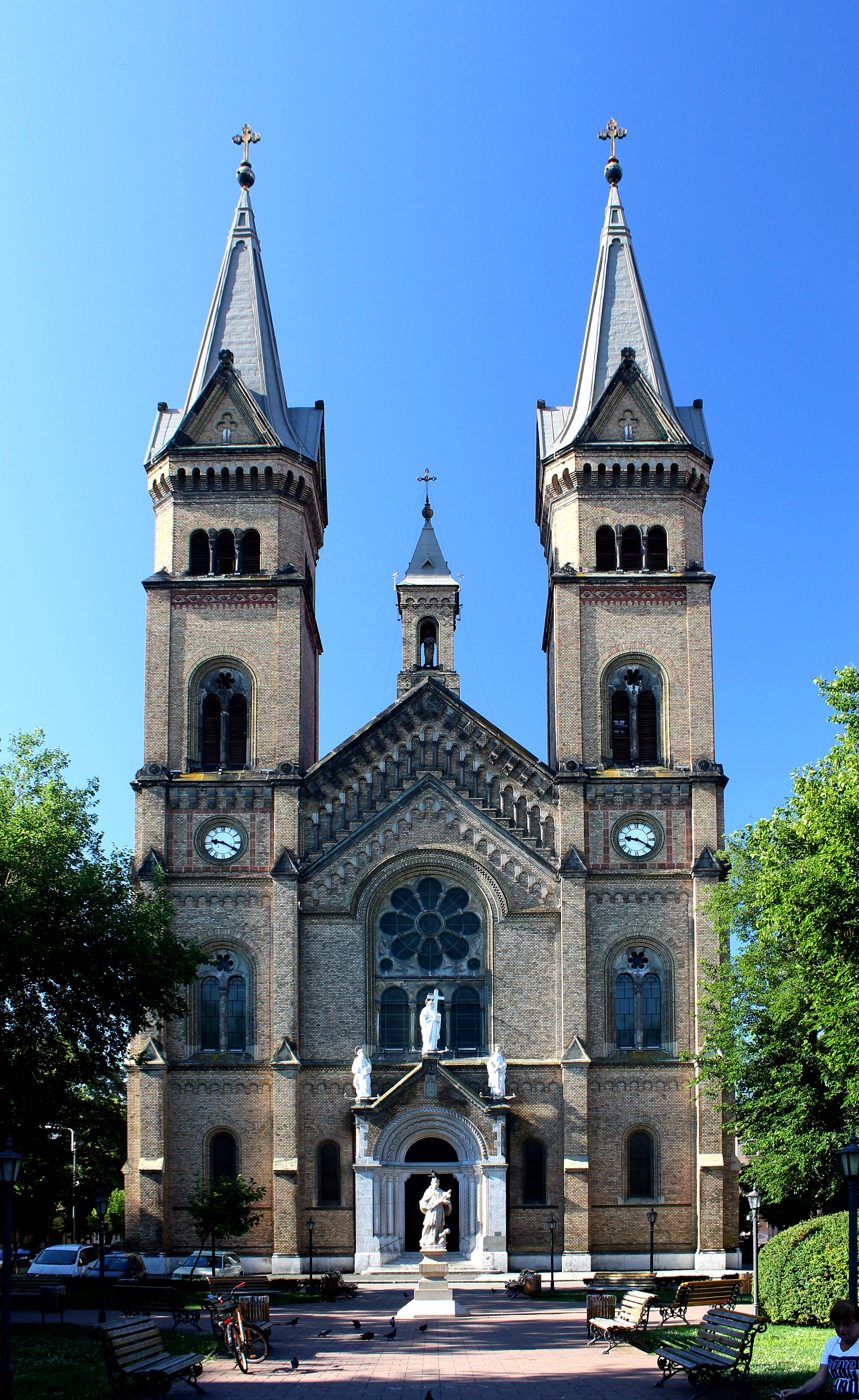

Religion
- Affiliation: Roman Catholic
- Patron: Blessed Virgin Mary
- Year consecrated: 1901
- Status: Active

Location
- Location: 2 Romans' Square, Timișoara
- Interactive map of Millennium Church
- Coordinates: 45°45′24″N 21°14′52″E

Architecture
- Architect: Ludwig von Ybl
- Style: Neo-Romanesque
- General contractor: Josef Kremer
- Groundbreaking: 1896
- Completed: 1901
- Construction cost: 815,427 kr.

Specifications
- Capacity: 3,000
- Length: 71.12 m
- Width: 27.5 m
- Height (max): 65.7 m

Website
- ro.biserica-millennium.ro

The Millennium Church, officially known as the Church of the Blessed Virgin Mary, Queen of Heaven, is the largest Roman Catholic church in Timișoara, located in the Romans' Square in the Fabric district. It was built to commemorate 1,000 years since the formation of the Hungarian state, hence its name Millennium. At present, Holy Masses are celebrated in Hungarian, German, Romanian and every Saturday evening in Italian.

== History ==
In 1765, the Catholic community of Timișoara built the Baroque Church of the Blessed Virgin Mary in Piața Vârful cu Dor near the beer factory. With the industrial growth in the Fabric district, the number of resident Catholics also increased, so that over time the old parish church proved to be too small.

In 1886, the senior abbot Anton Vudy initiated the formation of a committee in charge with the construction of the church, committee which also had the full support of the major representatives of the free city of Timișoara. The committee had a double leadership: a religious leader, the senior abbot Anton Vudy, and a lay president, Carol Telbisz, the mayor of Timișoara. The committee has decided that the new church will be named Millennium in honor of the 1,000th anniversary of the founding of the Hungarian state in 996. The committee contributed 150,000 Kronen. However, most of the total amount of 815,427 Kronen came from the funds of the municipality of Timișoara.

The plans for the Millennium Church were drawn up by the Budapest architect Ludwig von Ybl, and the work was carried out by the local builder Josef Kremer. The foundation stone was laid on 4 October 1896 by the archbishop of Cenad, Sándor Dessewffy. Almost 4 million bricks were used for the 71.12-meter-long and 27.5-meter-wide building. The neo-Romanesque construction was begun in 1896 and was finished in 1901, the church being consecrated on 13 October 1901.

The old parish church in Fabric was donated in 1906 to the Romanian Greek Catholic Church.

== Architecture ==
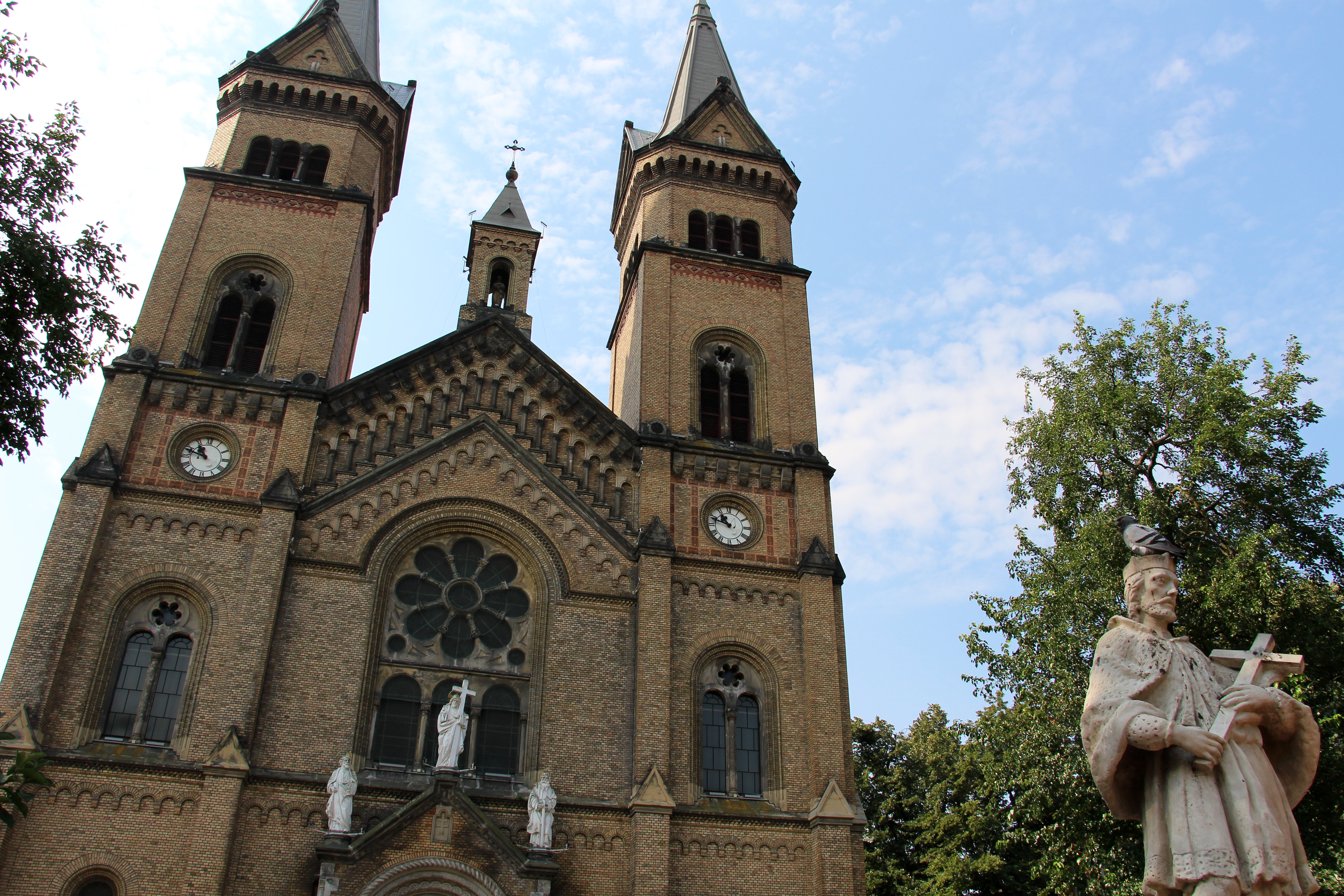
Millennium Church and the statue of John of Nepomuk

The Millennium Church is a three-nave basilica with a transept. Above the crossing is an octagonal crossing tower. Its architectural style bears neo-Romanesque and neo-Gothic traits. The outside of the church is covered in raw brick and its walls are 1–1.64 meters thick. The nave, the sanctuary and the dome are built of Portland cement. The church has two 65.7-meter-high towers and its central dome is 45 meters high. The inner surface of the church is 1170.15 m^{2}, containing 48 rows of pews and being able to hold up to 3,000 people. Three large statues are placed above the main entrance: Christ the Savior on the cross, flanked by the apostles Peter and Paul. The floor is covered in colored flag stones laid in cement. The chapel of St. Anthony of Padua is situated in the right-hand tower.

The largest bell weighs 2,420 kg and was cast in the bell foundry of Anton Novotny from Timișoara, assisted by the craftsman Neduhal, in 1896. Both the main and secondary altars are made of oak and were built by Dominik Donath of Austria. The style of the main altar is neo-Romanesque and is adorned, among other things, with the statues of the holy kings Stephen and Ladislaus, the statue of Christ the Savior enthroned above the whole ensemble. The main altarpiece is the work of the artist György Vastagh and depicts the Blessed Virgin Mary, the protectress of Hungary. She wears the crown of St. Stephen on her head, and the scepter in her hand. An angel at her feet wore the coat of arms of the Árpád dynasty. In the interwar years, the Romanian authorities, on the background of the worsening of bilateral relations with Hungary, but also in an attempt to strengthen the authority of the Romanian state through tougher measures, imposed the covering, by overpainting, of the old Hungarian coat of arms.

The interior of the church was painted by Bernard Menzer with motifs from the Secession period, but also with various scenes or images of saints. The windows are embellished with stained glass, made in Hungarian and German workshops, of which the four large stained glass windows in the apse stand out. One of them, depicting St. Louis, was donated by the architect Ludwig von Ybl, for which it even wears his noble coat of arms. The pulpit, located in the main nave, on the left side, was executed by Karl Wagner from Arad. The balcony of the choir is dominated by an imposing organ built in 1901 by master Carl Leopold Wegenstein, one of the most important organ builders in Banat.

In front of the church is the oldest statue of John of Nepomuk in Timișoara. The statue was brought here from its previous location in the courtyard of the Iosefin Roman Catholic Church (since 1932) after a three-month renovation by the restorer Ion Oprescu. It was consecrated on 13 October 2013 by the parish priest János Kapor. The statue was already standing in 1722, and in 1726 John of Nepomuk was declared the patron saint of the Banat of Temeswar.
