= Victor Babeș Infectious Diseases Hospital =

Victor Babeș Clinical Hospital for Infectious Diseases and Pneumophthisiology

Geography
- Location: Timișoara, Romania
- Coordinates: 45°46′5″N 21°15′32″E

Organisation
- Funding: Public hospital
- Type: Specialist

Services
- Emergency department: Yes
- Beds: 235
- Speciality: Infectious diseases

History
- Construction started: 1925
- Opened: 1932

Links
- Website: www.vbabestm.ro

The Victor Babeș Clinical Hospital for Infectious Diseases and Pneumophthisiology (Romanian: Spitalul Clinic de Boli Infecțioase și Pneumoftiziologie „Victor Babeș”) was founded in 1925 in the Green Forest of Timișoara as the only infectious diseases hospital in western Romania. It bears the name of Romanian pathologist Victor Babeș since 1952.

== History ==
In 1925, construction began on the current infectious diseases hospital building (the old pavilion) and the annex building (which now houses the hospital pharmacy). On 21 September 1932, the newly completed pavilion was designated for the treatment of patients with communicable diseases, including tuberculosis (TB). Prior to the opening of the new TB pavilion in 1942, the epidemic hospital operated with 50 beds for infectious diseases and 20 beds for TB patients. These 70 beds were attended to by four nurses, a sanitary officer, a disinfectant, and two maids.

The doctors who served the newly established unit were: Dimitrie Preda (1932–1959), Alfred Metz (1932–1936 and 1947–1949), Tiberiu Micle (1939–1942), Dumitru Hortopan (1940–1947), Oliver Pop (1946–1962), and Laurențiu Cucuruz (1946–1989). Alfred Metz, as a secondary physician, laid the foundations of the clinical laboratory of the newly built hospital.

From 1949 to 1969, Hans Röhrich served as the head of the infectious diseases hospital, where he established the first department of thoracic and lung surgery in Timișoara. The first lung segmentectomy was performed in 1958. Starting in 1961, thoracic surgery made significant progress in areas such as thoracic plastic surgery, pneumothorax, mediastinum, rib resection, and pericardium. Virgil Ene succeeded Hans Röhrich, taking over as head of the clinic in 1970.

The growing demand for hospital space prompted the construction of a new pavilion. Construction started in 1971, and the pavilion was inaugurated on 1 July 1973. Since then, the clinic has had 235 beds, including 10 designated for the anti-rabies service.

From 1973 to 1975, renovations were carried out on the old pavilion, with the introduction of central heating and hot and cold water in each ward, and heating was switched to methane gas. By separating a 28-bed ward, space for the intensive care unit was created, starting in Ward I on 9 April 1975, and in Ward II on 1 February 1978.

From December 1974 to June 1976, a new pavilion was constructed to serve as a clinical laboratory (the new Infectious Diseases building), which became operational on 1 March 1977, under the leadership of Jema Lacint.
