= Romans' Square, Timișoara =

Romans' Square
- City square
- Piața Romanilor
- Constructed: After 1868
- Length: 396.27 m
- Location: Timișoara, Romania
- Interactive map of Romans' Square
- Coordinates: 45°45′25″N 21°14′51″E

Romans' Square (Romanian: Piața Romanilor) is a public square in the Fabric district of Timișoara, Romania.

== History ==
Romans' Square was constructed on the Esplanade land, a non ædificandi zone where building was prohibited until 1868. That year, the Esplanade surrounding the fortress was shortened from 948 meters to 569 meters.

After 1868, construction began on the eastern side of the present square, with the fronton being fully enclosed in 1876. A notable building is the Miksa Róna Palace (1912), designed by architect Henrik Telkes.

A key factor in the development of Romans' Square was the horse-drawn tram line, which linked the Fabric and Cetate districts beginning in 1869. The tram line passed through the square, with the tram station positioned in its center.

On the southern side, the city's electricity supply "establishment" was constructed. After 1890, the first three houses were built on the western side of Romans' Square, facing the Cetate. On the northern side stood the restaurant "Queen of England," a building where the painter Oszkár Szuhanek, as well as the house of Dr. Samuel Kohn (1935), designed by architect Albert Krausz.

== Gallery ==
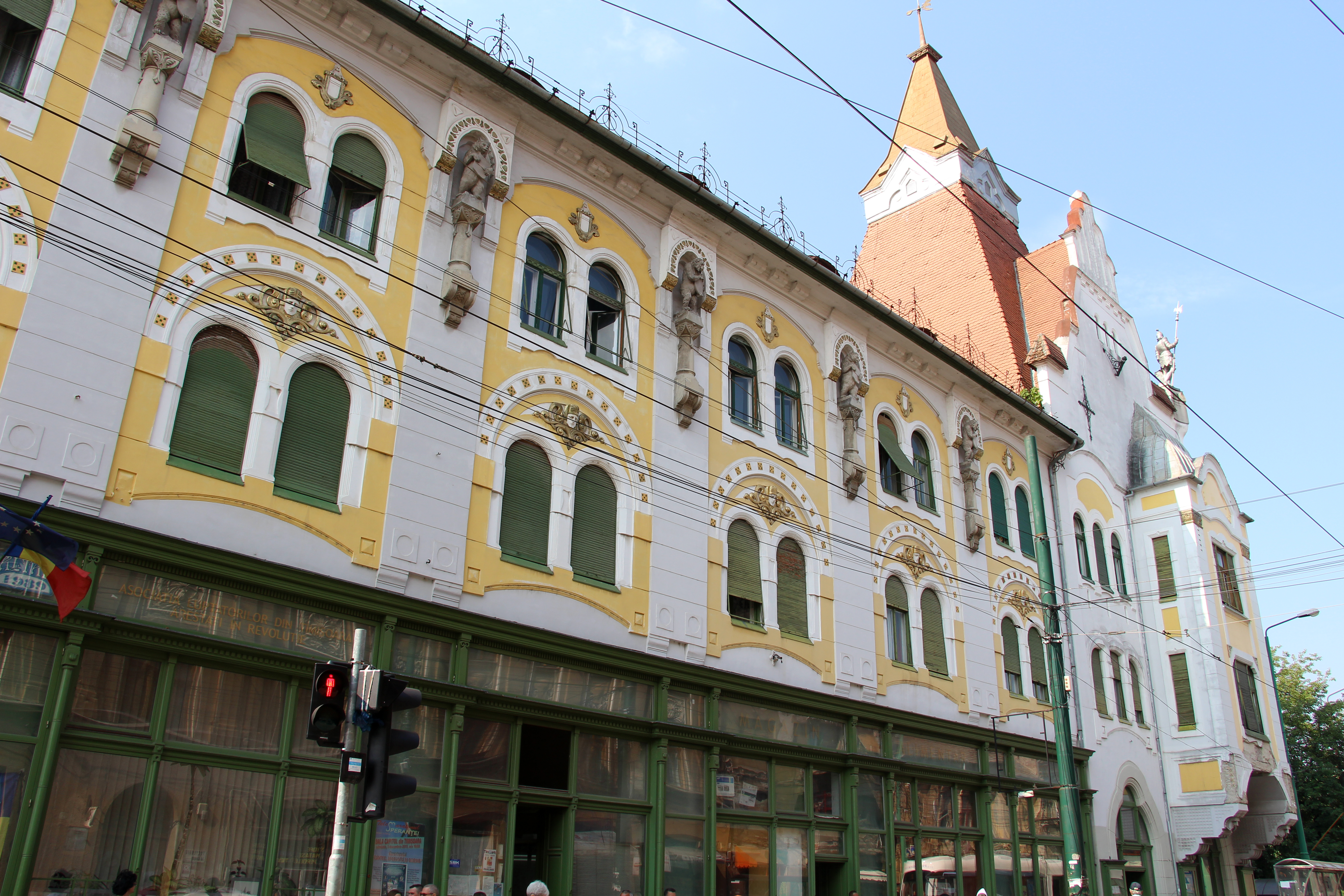
Ștefania Palace (Totisz Palace, House with Monkeys)

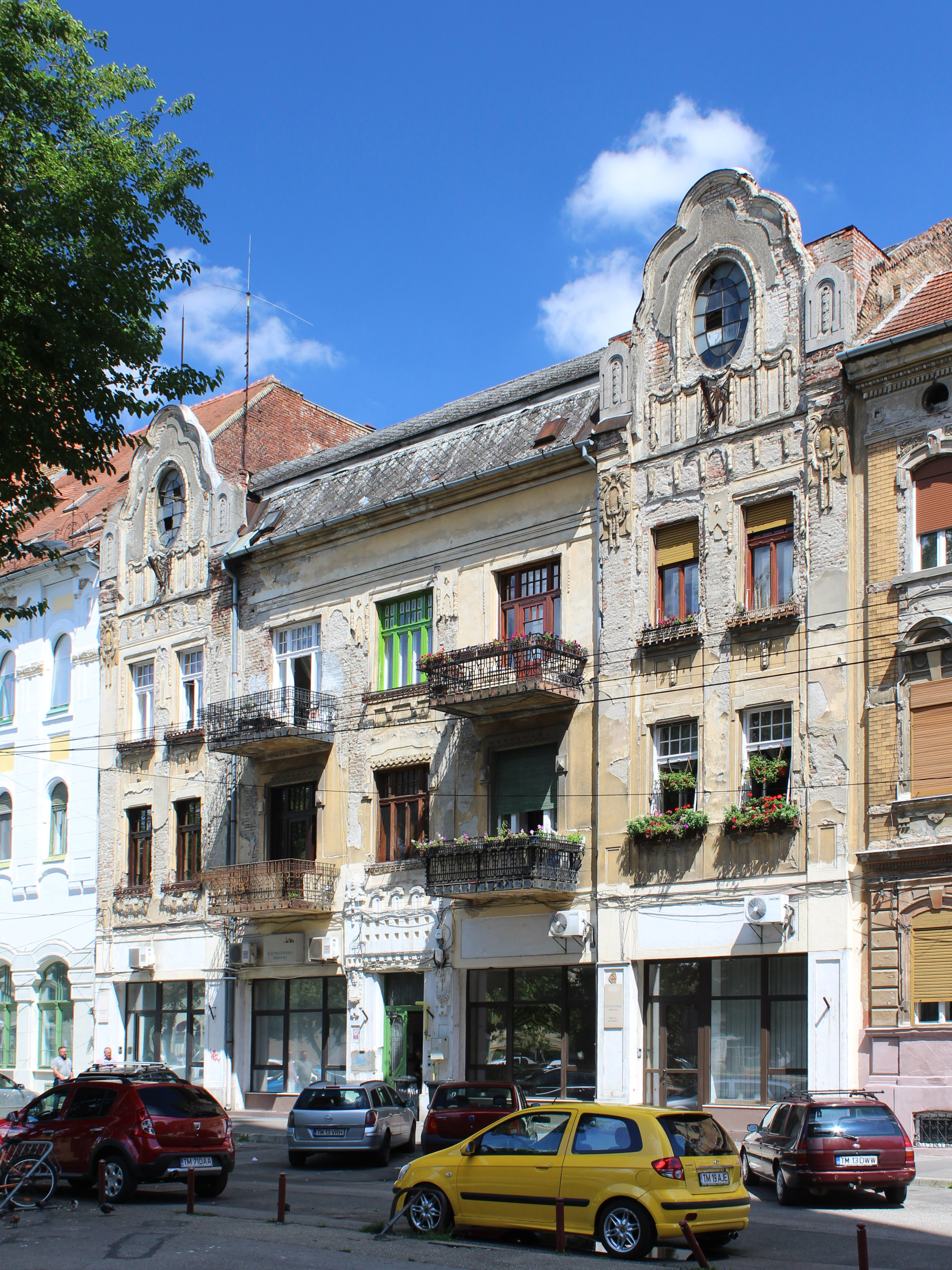
Miksa Róna Palace (Artúr Kincs Palace)

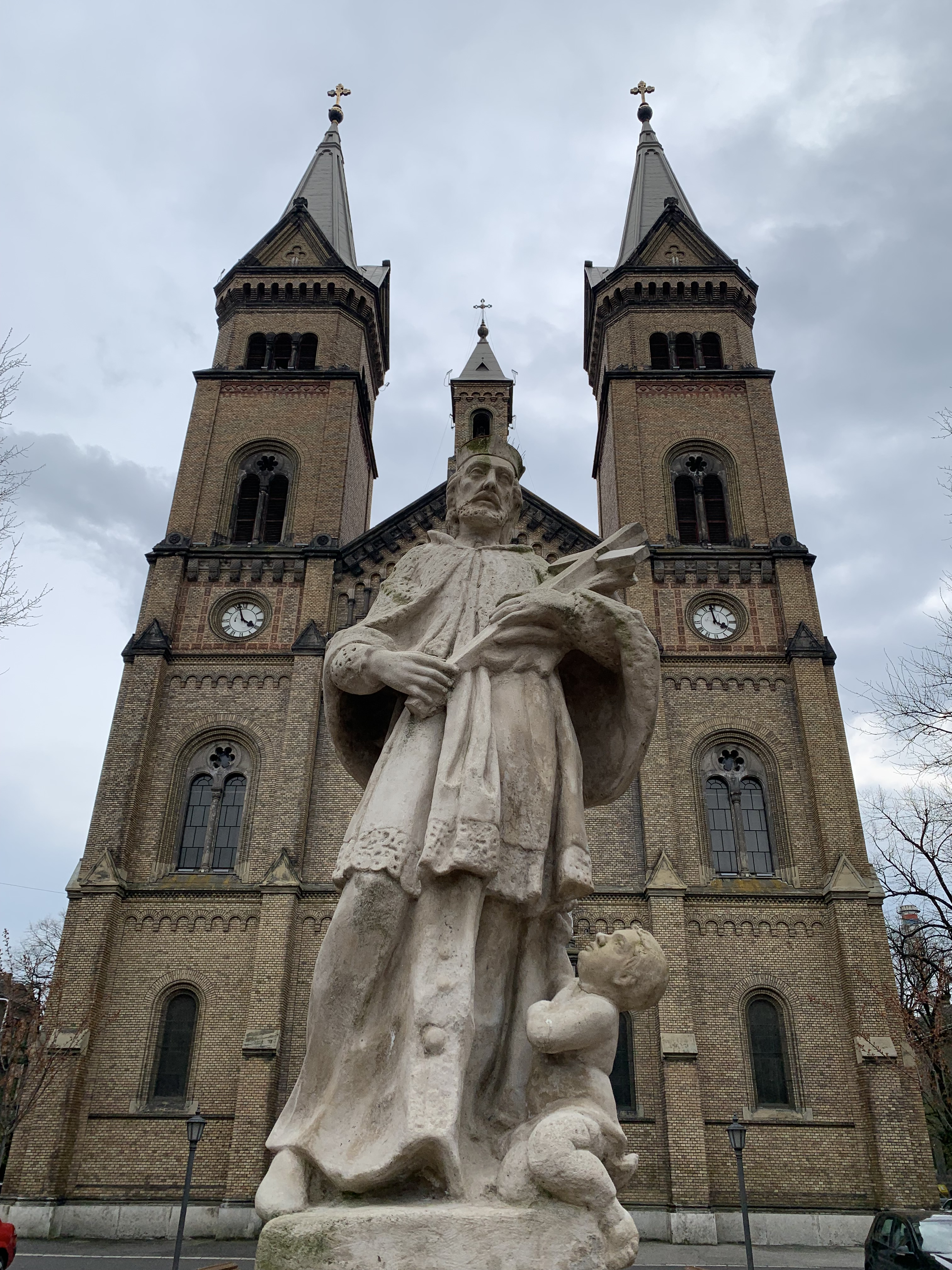
Millennium Church and the statue of John of Nepomuk
