= Neptune Public Bath =

- Baia Publică Neptun
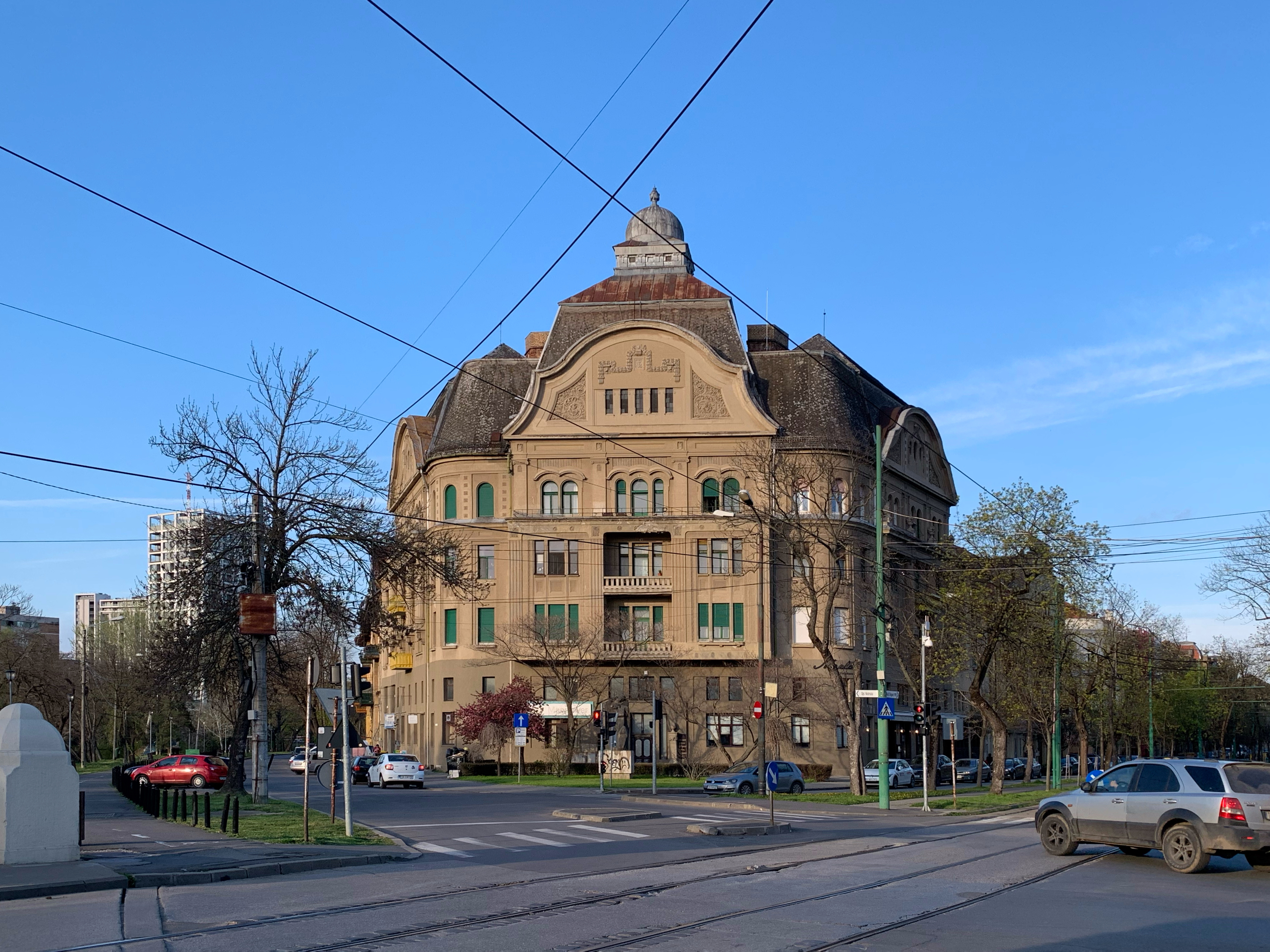
- Former names: Hungária fürdő
- Alternative names: Neptune Palace

General information
- Architectural style: Secession
- Location: Timișoara, Romania
- Coordinates: 45°45′23.92″N 21°14′31.14″E
- Construction started: 1912
- Completed: 1914
- Owner: Perenna

Design and construction
- Architect: László Székely

The Neptune Public Bath (Romanian: Baia Publică Neptun or Băile Neptun), also known as the Neptune Palace (Romanian: Palatul Neptun), is a historic building in the Fabric district of Timișoara, Romania. Originally a spa, today the building hosts office spaces, a luxury restaurant and around 20 apartments in the so-called Bloc Neptun.

== History ==
The Neptune Palace was built between 1912 and 1914 according to a project by László Székely, the chief architect of the city between 1903 and 1922. Initially, the building was supposed to be an elegant café, but the idea was rejected. At the time of its inauguration, Neptune Palace was equipped with a modern set of public baths, a swimming pool and a restaurant, which operated for a long time in Timișoara. The public baths had been designed to replace the former Turkish baths in the Fabric district, inasmuch as they were still a necessity in the early 20th century, with many residents not owning a bathroom in their houses. Also, for many years, a laundry functioned in the basement. The water polo team of the ILSA factory practiced in the swimming pool on the ground floor. Romania's first swimmer at the Olympics, Iosif Novak, used to train in the indoor pool at the Neptune Palace.

During the Austro-Hungarian Empire, Neptune Palace was called both Hungária fürdő ("Hungary Baths") and Székely House – after the architect László Székely, who was the first owner of the building. After 1919, it received the name it keeps until today – Neptune Palace (Baths), with some exceptions when the edifice is referred to as Central Bath or People's Baths. In the 1930s, the Nobel family owned the palace. With the establishment of the communist regime, the Neptune Palace was nationalized, belonging to the Salubrity department of GIGCL Timiș.

The swimming pool and public baths functioned until around 2000, when the swimming pool was covered, a fitness room being built on top, and then a luxury restaurant, which still exists today. In 2003, Neptune Palace was taken over by a company from Banat that bottles mineral water, which also carried out extensive renovation works on the building.

== Architecture ==
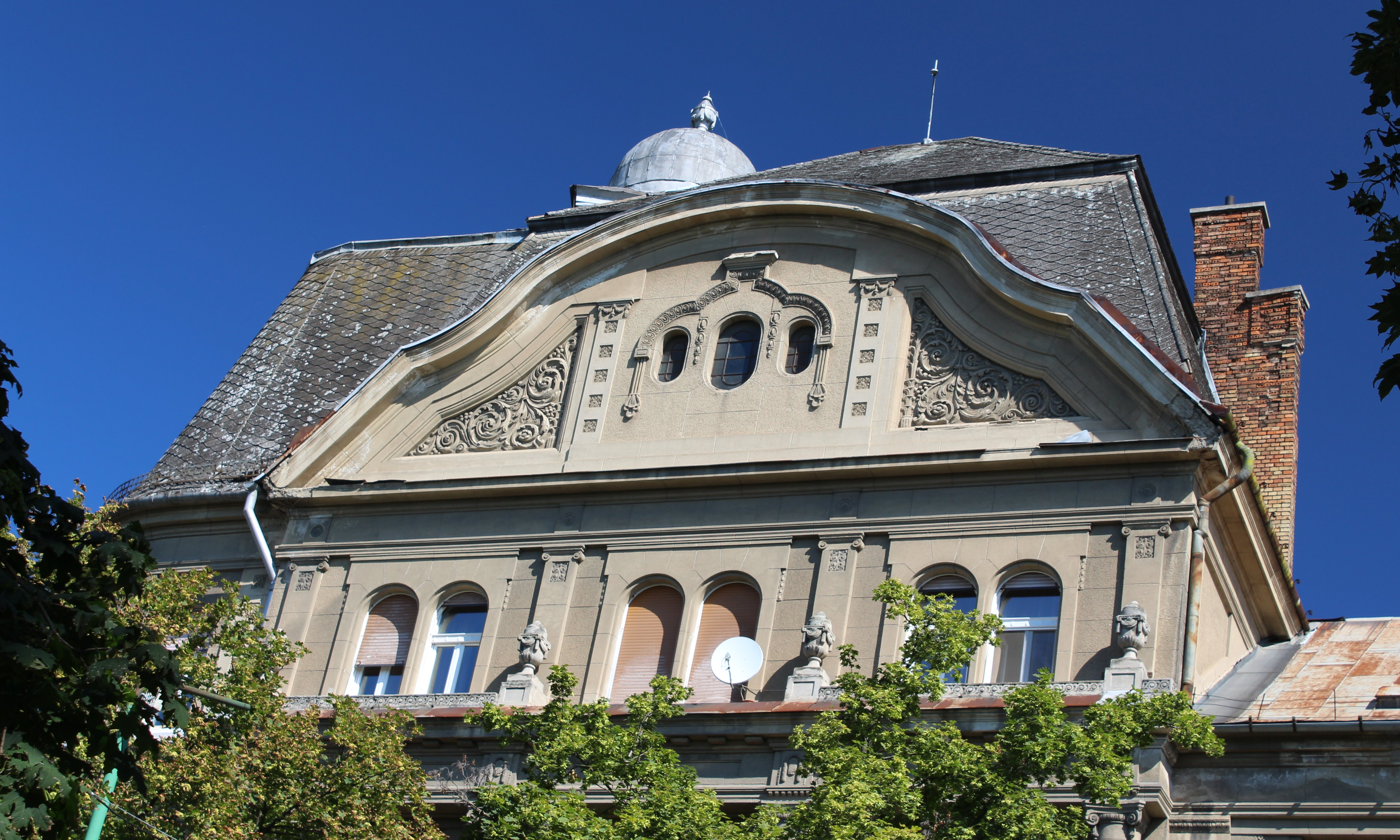
Architectural details of the main facade

As an architectural style, the building belongs to the Viennese Secession movement, whose characteristics can be recognized in the wavy forms of the pediment, the floral decorations on the upper part and the side facades decorated with Doric semi-columns on two levels. Unlike other monumental buildings designed by László Székely, this one does not abound in decorations.

The upper floors of the building were designed as residential apartments for wealthy tenants. They had a separate entrance from the aquatic facility. It was located on the side facing the Bega Canal (currently the Dniester Embankment). The name Bloc Neptun gained ground especially during communism, when the public baths in the basement and the apartment block were administered separately. The access gate made of cast iron and with stained glass-like meshes is preserved to this day.

The roof is characterized by large volumes, trapezoidal shapes and a round dome and is believed to have been inspired by the style of the Viennese architect Otto Wagner. On the facade of the palace, in the upper part, there is still a simple monogram with the initials LS, after the name of the architect László Székely.
