= House with Guild Tree =

- Casa cu Pomul Breslelor
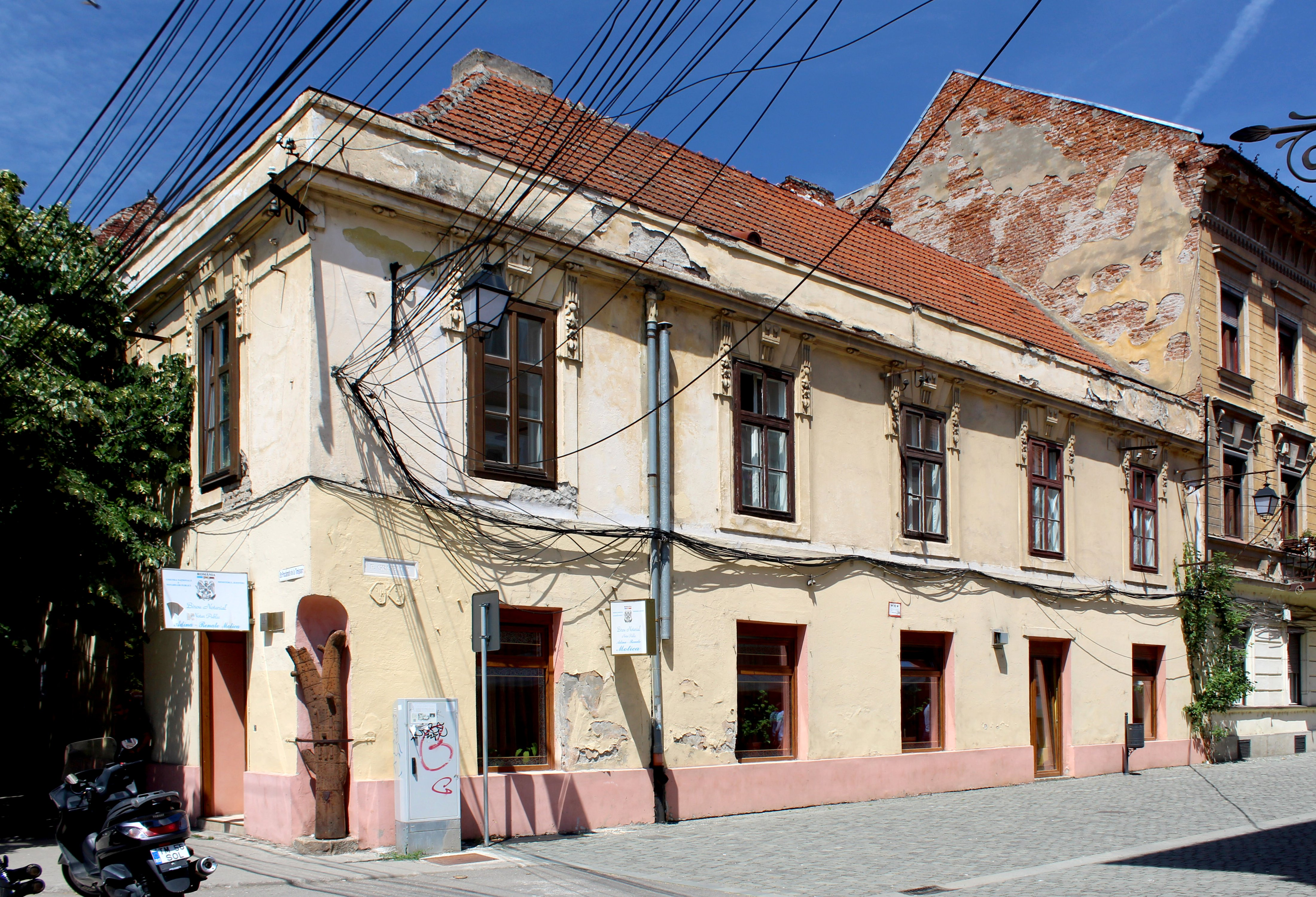
- Alternative names: House with Iron Tree

General information
- Address: 3 Proclamation of Timișoara Street, Timișoara, Romania
- Coordinates: 45°45′21″N 21°13′50″E
- Year(s) built: 1752

The House with Guild Tree (Romanian: Casa cu Pomul Breslelor), also known as the House with Iron Tree (Romanian: Casa cu Pomul de Fier), is a historical building in the Cetate district of Timișoara, Romania. At the corner of the house stands a replica of the "Guild Tree," with the original housed in the National Museum of Banat. Though surrounded by various legends, it is generally believed to have served as a house sign.

== History ==
The house was built in 1752 by master mason Johann Lechner, who also owned the property, on a plot measuring 128 square fathoms (approximately 460 square meters). In 1827, ownership passed to the Macedonian-Romanian merchant Andreas Trandaphil. After seeing the Iron Tree (German: Stock im Eisen) in Vienna, Trandaphil commissioned a similar piece from craftsman Moritz Heim, which was installed in 1828. Heim also crafted an Iron Tree in Arad in 1827. The tree was secured to the building with an iron belt fastened by a padlock, which disappeared in 1958. Today, the original metal trunk is preserved at the National Museum of Banat, while the version displayed at the corner of the building is a faithful replica, created in 1998 by Alexandru Fota, a restorer from the museum.

In 1850, the house hosted an upholstery shop, and by 1936, during the interwar period, it was home to the Hubertus hunting-themed restaurant.

During post-World War II renovations on the ground floor of the building, two wall paintings were uncovered. One of them, depicting an apprentice hammering nails, was created during the interwar period by Banat painter Franz Ferch.

== Architecture ==
This corner building has its entrance on Proclamation of Timișoara Street. As it consists of only one upper floor, Banat architectural terminology refers to it simply as a house. Horizontal circulation on the first floor is facilitated by two open galleries supported by cantilevered wooden beams, located in the inner courtyard. The exterior facades are simple. The upstairs windows are decorated with Secession-style elements.

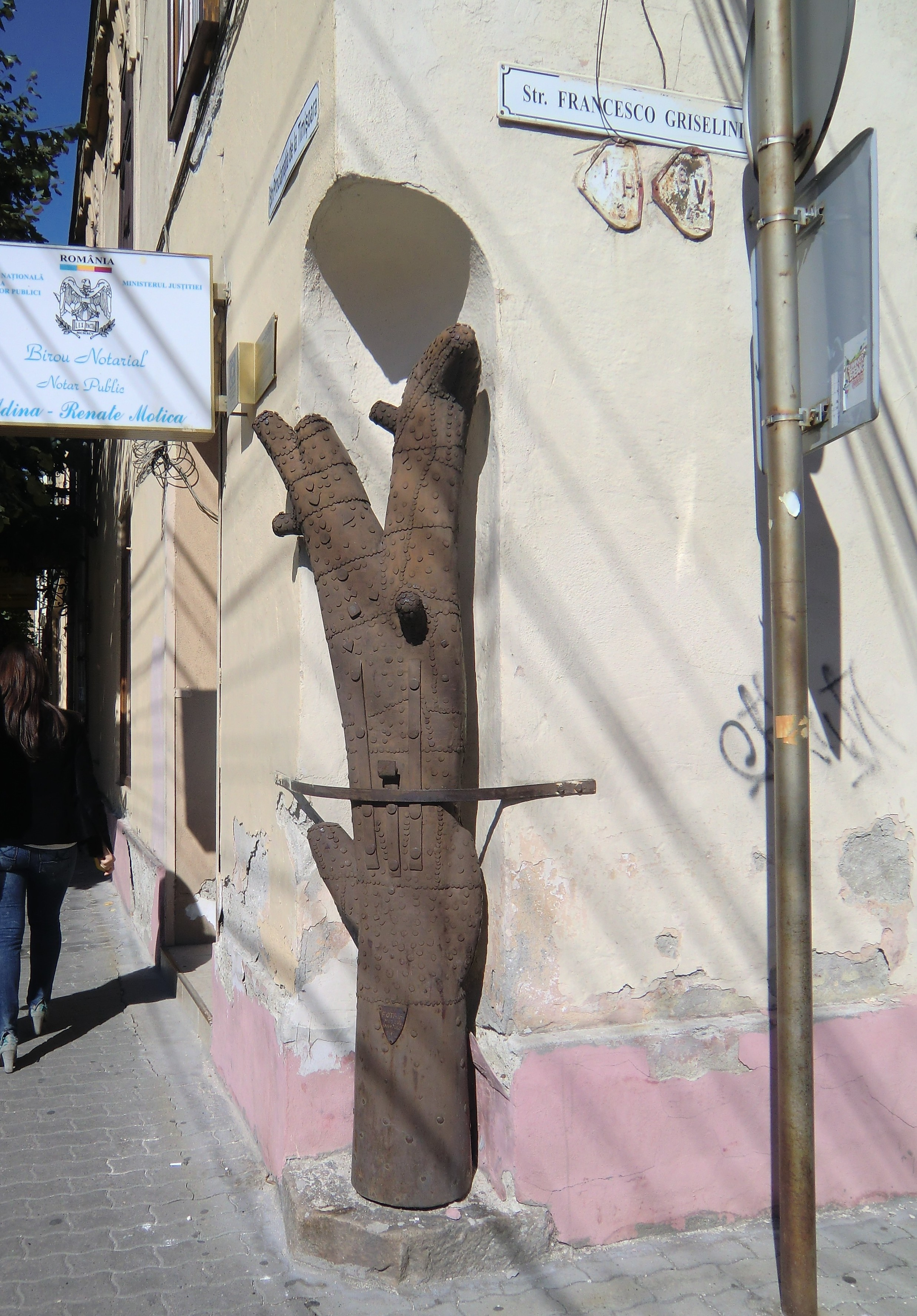
Replica of the Iron Tree on the exterior wall of the house. It is a sessile oak trunk, which branches into two arms at the top and has several stumps.

The tree is set within a small ogival niche and consists of a trunk measuring 30 cm in diameter and 214 cm in length, wrapped in thin black sheet metal. Copper nails with flat or rounded heads are driven into the trunk—many serving to secure the sheet metal pieces and fasten them to the wood. Additionally, numerous decorative nails are present, their heads engraved with initials or various symbols. Originally, the tree was fastened to the wall using an iron belt with loops (or "ears") at both ends: one end was fixed and secured to a loop embedded in the wall, while the other end passed through a second loop and was locked with a padlock. On the trunk, in front of the belt, three vertical bars are attached—the central one, shorter than the others, curves at the top to form a bracket designed to support the fastening belt.

The modern name, "Guild Tree," was adopted during the communist era due to censorship, as the original name—"Iron Tree"—evoked associations with the Iron Guard, Iron Cross, and similar references. However, the current name is somewhat misleading, as it implies the tree was linked to multiple guilds, which was not actually the case.

The tree was likely used as a house sign—an easier way to identify the property than by its lot number, as was common in 18th-century records—or possibly as the symbol of a hardware store. In addition to the House with Guild Tree, the city also boasts the House with Iron Axle and the Prince Eugene House. Other similar examples can be found in Austria (Vienna), Hungary (Győr, Budapest, Pécs, Székesfehérvár), and Slovakia (Bratislava).

== Legends ==
According to legend, journeyman locksmiths would travel across Europe to work and gain experience. In Timișoara, they were challenged to unlock the bar securing the tree to the wall—a task they couldn't complete, as the lock had no keyhole. As a token of their visit, they would drive a nail bearing their monogram into the tree, often engraved on the nail's head.

One version of the legend suggests that apprentices were also tasked with finding the key to the lock, given a year to accomplish the task. Of course, they too were unable to open the lock, and after a year, upon becoming journeymen, they hammered a nail into the tree. The total number of nails driven into the tree is estimated to be around 2,000.

The legend of the Iron Tree in Vienna dates back to the Middle Ages. According to the tale, a young locksmith made a Faustian bargain to craft perfectly secure locks, with the condition that he would lose his soul if he ever missed Sunday service. With the help of supernatural forces, he became a renowned and wealthy master. However, after a party, he failed to wake up in time and missed Sunday mass. This legend is linked to the Iron Tree in St. Stephen's Square in Vienna, which has been documented since 1533. To perform an exorcism, apprentices would hammer nails into a tree that was secured with a padlock they had made.
