= Palace of the Chamber of Commerce and Industry =

- Palatul Camerei de Comerț și Industrie
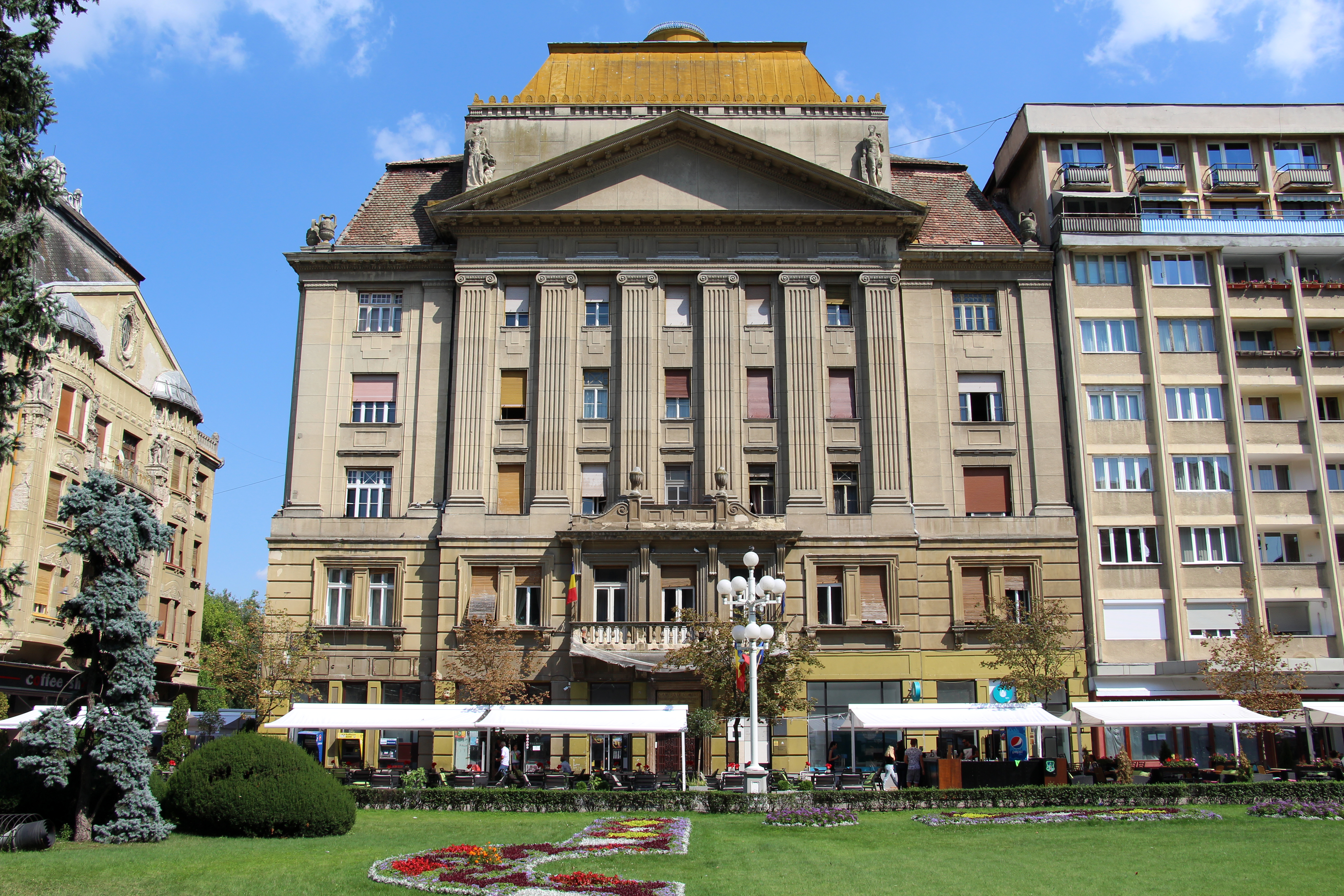
- Interactive map of the Palace of the Chamber of Commerce and Industry area

General information
- Architectural style: Eclectic
- Location: 3 Victory Square; Timișoara; Romania
- Coordinates: 45°45′8″N 21°13′32″E
- Construction started: 1928
- Completed: 1930

Technical details
- Floor count: 5

Design and construction
- Architect: László Székely

The Palace of the Chamber of Commerce and Industry (Romanian: Palatul Camerei de Comerț și Industrie) is a five-story historical monument building in Victory Square in Timișoara, Romania.

== History ==
The Timișoara Chamber of Commerce was established in 1850 by decree of Emperor Franz Joseph I. The first president of the institution was the businessman Ludwig von Bersuder. Initially, the Chamber of Commerce was based in the Lloyd Palace until it received its own building. It operated until 1949, when it was suspended by the communist government. In 1990, it was the first regional Chamber of Commerce to resume its activities after the Romanian Revolution of 1989.

For the design of the Chamber's future headquarters, an architectural competition was organized in 1913. The beneficiary's requirements were, among other things, the inclusion of a bank headquarters in the building, floors equipped with apartments for rent, commercial spaces on the ground floor and a brewery in the basement of the building. Among the 106 proposals received, the project of the architects Ármin Leimdörfer and Emil Rácz was declared the winner, rewarded with 3,000 crowns. But the outbreak of the First World War put on hold the construction plans of the edifice designed by Leimdörfer and Rácz, an edifice that was never completed. At the beginning of November 1923, a temporary pavilion was built on the site of the future palace, on the occasion of the visit of King Ferdinand I. A month later, the Timișoara Chamber of Commerce submitted an application for obtaining an authorization to build the headquarters. The local council approved the request, with the obligation to erect a building as tall as the Löffler Palace and to harmonize stylistically with the rest of the buildings in Victory Square. Like the other palaces lining the square, the project belonged to the architect László Székely. The building is one of the newest in the square, having been completed in 1925.

Among the first tenants of the palace were Pallas Bank, the film rental company Alipia, the Association of Merchants and Producers from Banat, the underwear company Minerva and the office of the glass factory from Tomești. The Ulpia company's workshop and projection room functioned in the attic of the building.

During the communist period, the county cabinet of the Romanian Communist Party functioned here, on the first floor. The party library also functioned here until 1989.

== Architecture ==
From an architectural point of view, the building can be considered eclectic, but having many neoclassical influences, through the use of triangular pediments, monumental pilasters of Ionic style (a motif often used by László Székely in the last period of creation) or classically inspired friezes. The balanced silhouette of the edifice is noticeable, whose symmetrical facade visually rests on the first two levels, marked by bossages. The access to the building, located in the axis of symmetry of the building, is subtle, with few decorations.

The building has a vast basement, a high ground floor dedicated to commercial activities and four floors visible from the outside, including an upstairs boardroom, which retains to this day the original wood paneling and solid furniture made by local companies Spira and Druelker, but also by Molnár and Dóra Krauser's company.

The general sobriety of the building, the fineness of the details and the grandeur and complexity of the roof's volume are noteworthy, marked by a pediment of classical style, which also includes two large statues, placed at the ends. The statue on the right depicts a man and represents the metallurgical industry, and the statuary group placed on the left, consisting of a woman and a child, symbolizes the household industry.
