= House with Atlantes =

- Casa cu Atlanți
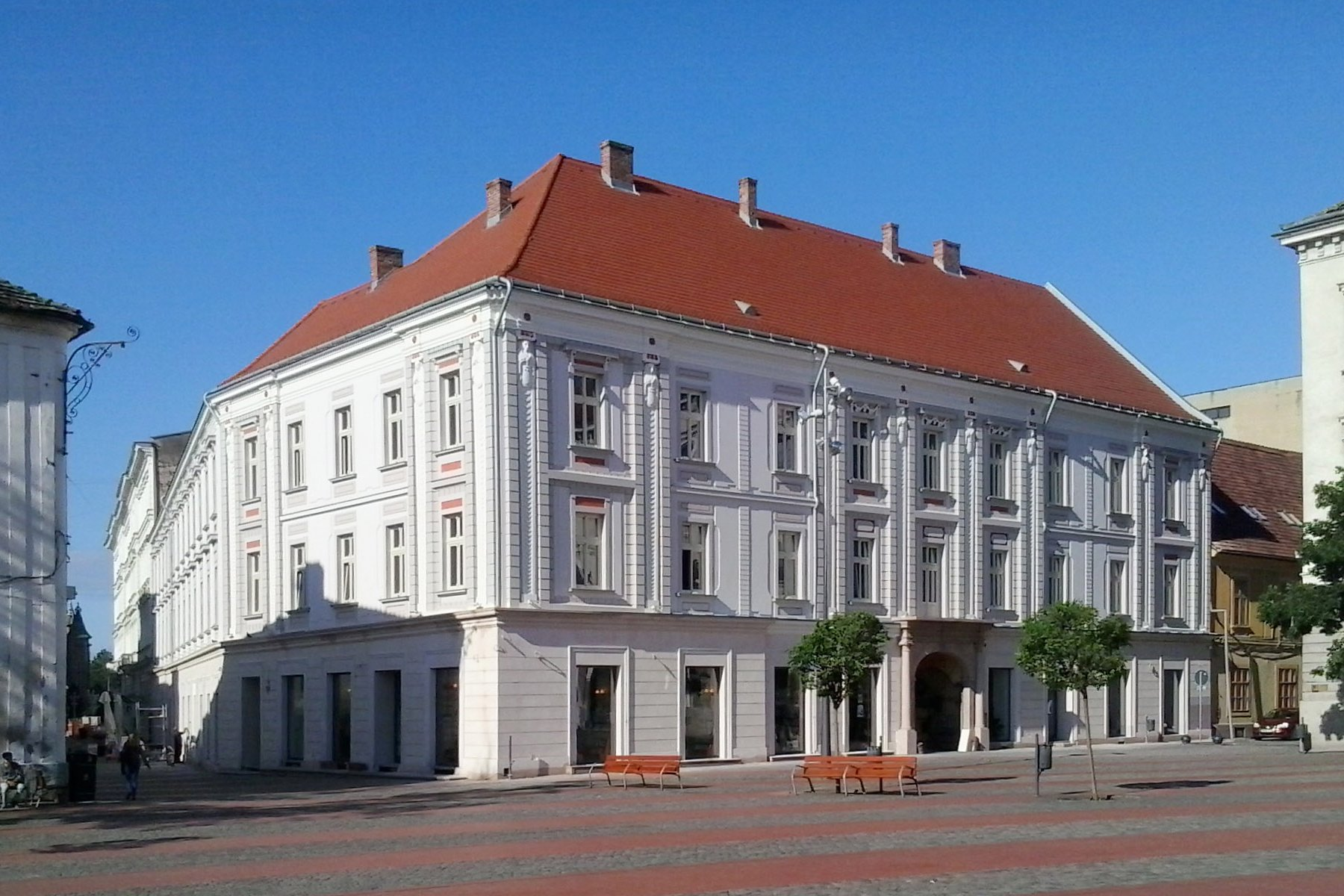
- Interactive map of the House with Atlantes area
- Alternative names: Macri House

General information
- Architectural style: Neoclassical
- Location: Timișoara, Romania
- Coordinates: 45°45′17″N 21°13′35″E
- Construction started: 1812; 214 years ago
- Completed: 1816; 210 years ago

Technical details
- Grounds: 2,186 m^{2} (23,530 sq ft)

Renovating team
- Architect: Lipót Baumhorn

The House with Atlantes (Romanian: Casa cu Atlanți), also known as Macri House (Romanian: Casa Macri), is a historical monument in Timișoara, Romania. It is located on an important commercial street in the historic center of the city. Its name comes from the atlantes depicted on the columns that make up the facade of the building.

== History ==
The house was built between 1812 and 1816 in neoclassical style by Toma Naum Macri (1791–1849), a rich merchant from Timișoara of Aromanian origin. It had about 40 rooms, quite spacious, according to the fashion of the time, and was intended for occasional tenants. The house was among the first civilian buildings in the Liberty Square, reserved at that time for military administration buildings. By 1788, there was a Turkish house with wooden floor and payanda on the current site of the Macri House.

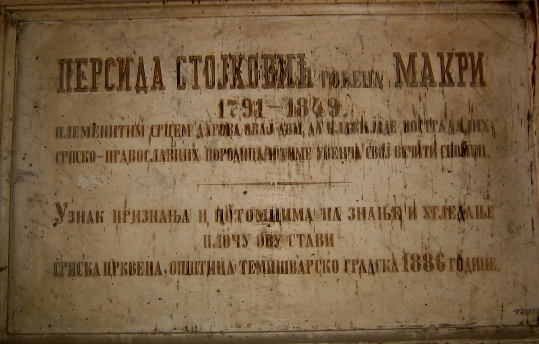
Inscription in Serbian attesting the name of the first rightful owner of the house, Persida Macri-Stoicovici

After Macri's death, the building became the property of his daughter Sida (Persida), who then also married an Aromanian, Stoica (also known by his Serbianized name Stojković). Under the gate there is a reddish marble plaque commemorating, in the Serbian language, Persida Macri-Stoicovici. It was fixed on the wall in 1886. In June 1849, Persida outlined in her will that following her death—as well as the deaths of her sister-in-law and several other close relatives—a foundation named "Macri-Stoicovici" would be established. This foundation was eventually founded in December 1860, with approval from the government of Voivodeship of Serbia and Banat of Temeschwar. Its purpose was to support those in need and to provide scholarships to young Serbian students. Beginning in 1912, the City Savings House also operated from the same location.

The Macri Foundation ceased its operations in 1968, "for reasons independent of its will and that of its governing bodies and administrators, but for reasons of a political nature." In December of the same year, despite being a legal entity with the status of vacant succession, the building was unjustifiably transferred to the ownership of the Romanian state. In 1996, it was fraudulently acquired by the controversial businessman Mujea Marcelini, who had been convicted of cigarette smuggling. The Serbian Orthodox Parish of Cetate engaged in a 25-year legal battle at the Timișoara Court to reclaim ownership of the building. During the course of the lawsuit, in 2004, Marcelini sold the House with Atlantes to the company Indus, whose partners included Mirel Ceulescu, founder of Arthema—the largest bathroom furniture manufacturer in Romania. Indus was confirmed as the rightful owner by the Timișoara Court's final ruling in 2014 and later carried out renovations on the building between 2018 and 2019.

== Architecture ==
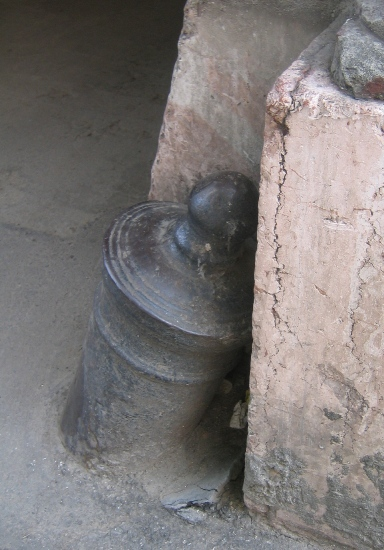
One of the two Turkish cannons guarding the entrance

The house exemplifies neoclassical architecture, enhanced by Baroque details and mythological motifs. It is recognizable for the 12 8-meter high atlantes that adorn its facade. They were made by Hungarian architect Lipót Baumhorn later, at the beginning of the 20th century. The main entrance located on the short side from the Liberty Square is a stone portal, flanked by two Ionic columns that also support the building's only balcony and that keep two wheel launchers in the form of cannons buried with the barrel upside down. According to local legends, they would be the first Turkish cannons conquered by the Habsburg army during the 1716 siege.
