= Timișoara Garrison Command =

Garrison Command
- Comenduirea Garnizoanei
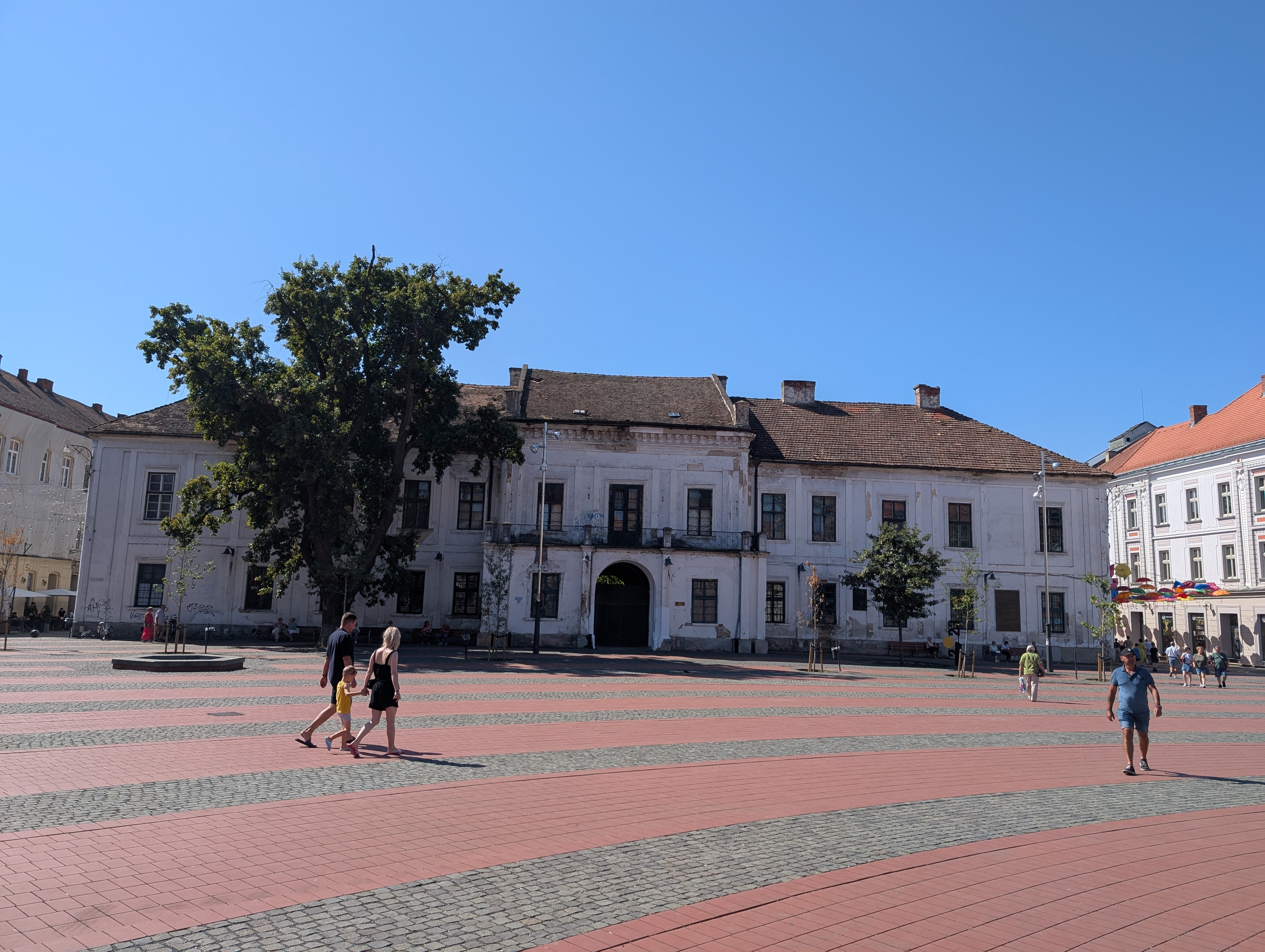
- Former names: New Generalate
- Alternative names: Army House

General information
- Location: Liberty Square, Timișoara, Romania
- Coordinates: 45°45′17″N 21°13′38″E
- Owner: Ministry of Culture

The Garrison Command (Romanian: Comenduirea Garnizoanei), also known as the Army House (Romanian: Casa Armatei), is a historical building in the Liberty Square in Timișoara, Romania. It served in turn the Habsburg, Austro-Hungarian and Romanian military authorities, and in recent decades, on the building's floor, a museum dedicated to military history operated under the authority of the Military Circle of Timișoara. In 2019, the building was transferred from the Ministry of Culture in order to organize a Museum of the Romanian Revolution of 1989.

== History ==
Also known as the New Generalate (Romanian: Generalatul Nou), the building is part of the Cetate urban site. It appears on the plans of Timișoara since 1727, being considered the oldest building that has preserved its original volumetry. Following the conquest of Timișoara by the Habsburgs in 1716, they demolished all the buildings, except for the Huniade Castle, but it was rebuilt differently in 1856 after the destruction suffered during the siege of 1849.

The building, originally in Baroque style, is square in shape. The facade towards the square had one floor and an attic. In the middle of the facade there were three arches, through which access was made to the building. Later, a terrace was arranged above the three arches. Currently, only the central arch has been preserved, the others being closed. The side wings only had a ground floor.

On the ground floor were the kitchen, the stables, the rooms for servants and ordinances. On the first floor there were living rooms, offices and the archive. In the attic there were living rooms and storage rooms. In the roof area, the three bays marking the entrance from the ground floor were accentuated by a triangular pediment. The pediment also appears on the engravings after 1853. But the attic no longer existed, perhaps as a result of the destruction during the siege of 1849 (perhaps the roof burned during the artillery bombardment).

In the 18th century, the building was the residence of the military governor generals of Timișoara. This is also where Count Claude Florimond de Mercy lived. Between 1849 and 1860 it was the administrative headquarters of the newly established province of Serbian Voivodeship and Banate of Temeschwar. Emperor Franz Joseph was also hosted here during his visit to Timișoara from 14 to 16 June 1852. In 1923, King Ferdinand and Queen Marie planted the two oak trees that are still standing in front of the building today.

== Military Museum ==
Opened in 1996, the museum was organized in six rooms, five of them reflecting distinct periods in Romania's history – Decebalus, the Early Middle Ages, the Middle Ages, Michael the Brave, the Union of the Romanian Principalities and the two world wars –, and the hall called the Hall of Arms and Military Uniforms, including exhibits of this kind from different historical periods. The museum's heritage consisted of more than 2,000 museum objects: maps, documents, models of historical monuments, photographs, weaponry and military uniforms.

The museum was subordinated to the Ministry of National Defense until May 2019, when, by government decision, the right to administer the building passed to the Ministry of Culture, which intends to rehabilitate the building and set it up as the National Museum of the Anti-Communist Revolution of December 1989.
