= Deschan Palace =

- Palatul Deschan
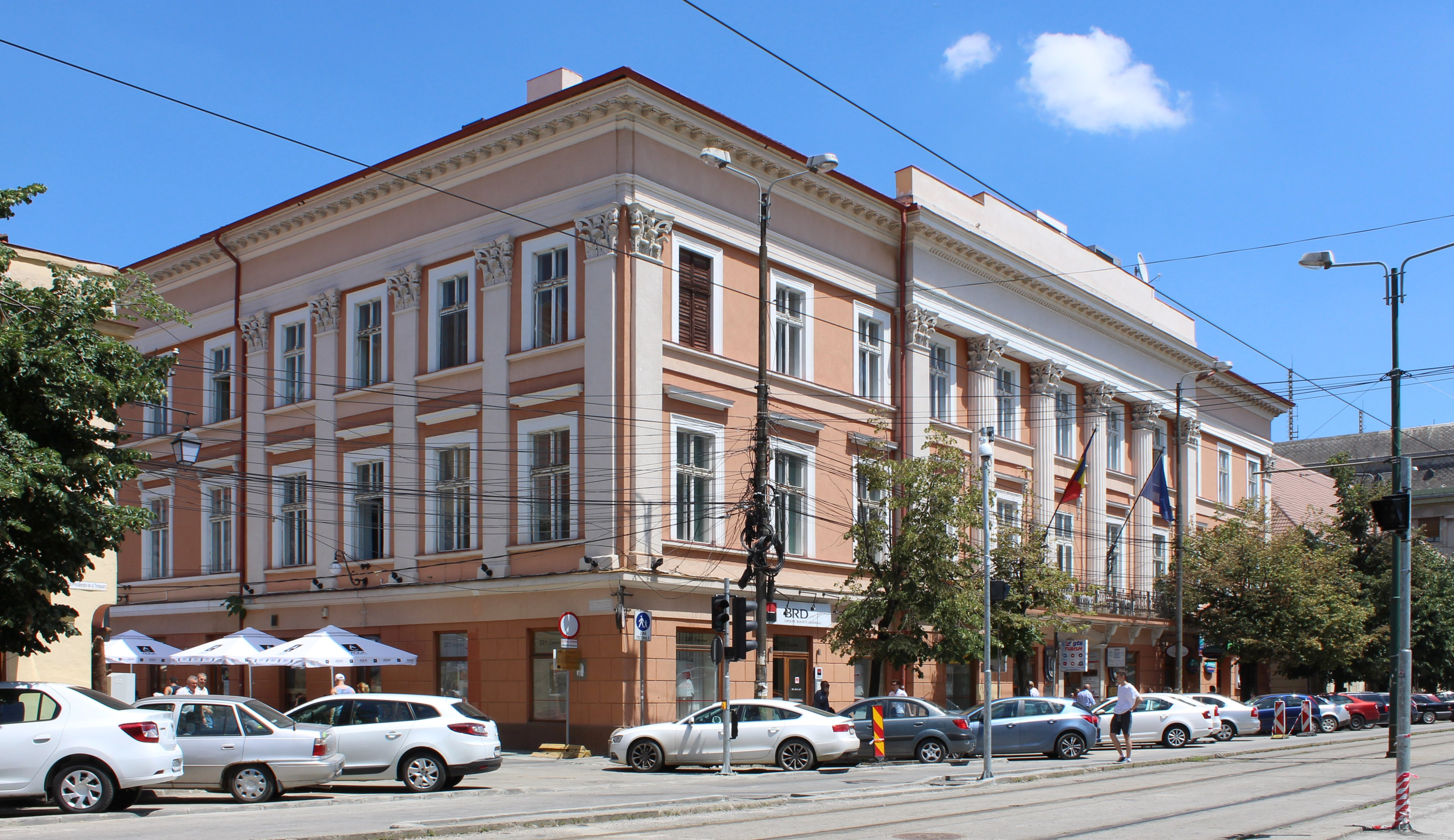
- The southern body of the Deschan Palace
- Interactive map of the Deschan Palace area
- Alternative names: Scherter House

General information
- Architectural style: Neoclassical
- Location: Timișoara, Romania
- Coordinates: 45°45′22″N 21°13′52″E
- Completed: 1735

The Deschan Palace (Romanianized as Dejan), also known as the Scherter House, is a historic building in Timișoara, Romania, built in 1735 in the neoclassical style. The building hosted the first bazaar and the first casino in Timișoara.

== History ==
The palace was built around 1735 by the de Jean family, originally from France, who received a noble title in 1744 and on this occasion changed their name to Deschan de Hansen. Johann Anton Deschan von Hansen was a councilor of the Hungarian Court Chamber at the time. He participated in the siege of 1716 under the command of Prince Eugene of Savoy and then became an advisor to Governor Florimond de Mercy. The plot of the palace (about 2,400 m^{2}) was in the 17th–20th centuries the largest plot belonging to a civil owner in the Timișoara Fortress – which reflects the special importance of its owner. Later, the first bazaar in Timișoara opened in the inner courtyard. For a long time, the building was simply known by the people of Timișoara as the "Bazaar" (Romanian: Bazarul).

The southern body of the palace was rebuilt and expanded in 1802 (or 1810), where in 1830 the first casino in Timișoara was set up on the first floor. After the Romanian Revolution, the building was returned and renovated by the current owners. Currently inside it are commercial spaces.

== Architecture ==
The eastern, northern and western bodies are made in the so-called "provincial baroque" style, with simple facades and windows with "traditional" frames. The southern body corresponds to the neoclassical style. The ground floor of the southern body is designed as a socle with bossages. On the first and second floors, the main avant-corps is punctuated by semi-columns and pilasters with classic Corinthian capitals. The cornice decorated in a classicist manner is also noteworthy. The gate ends with a basket-handle arch. The inner courtyard has verandas leaning on arches.
