= Palace of the United Banat Banks =

- Palatul Băncilor Bănățene Unite
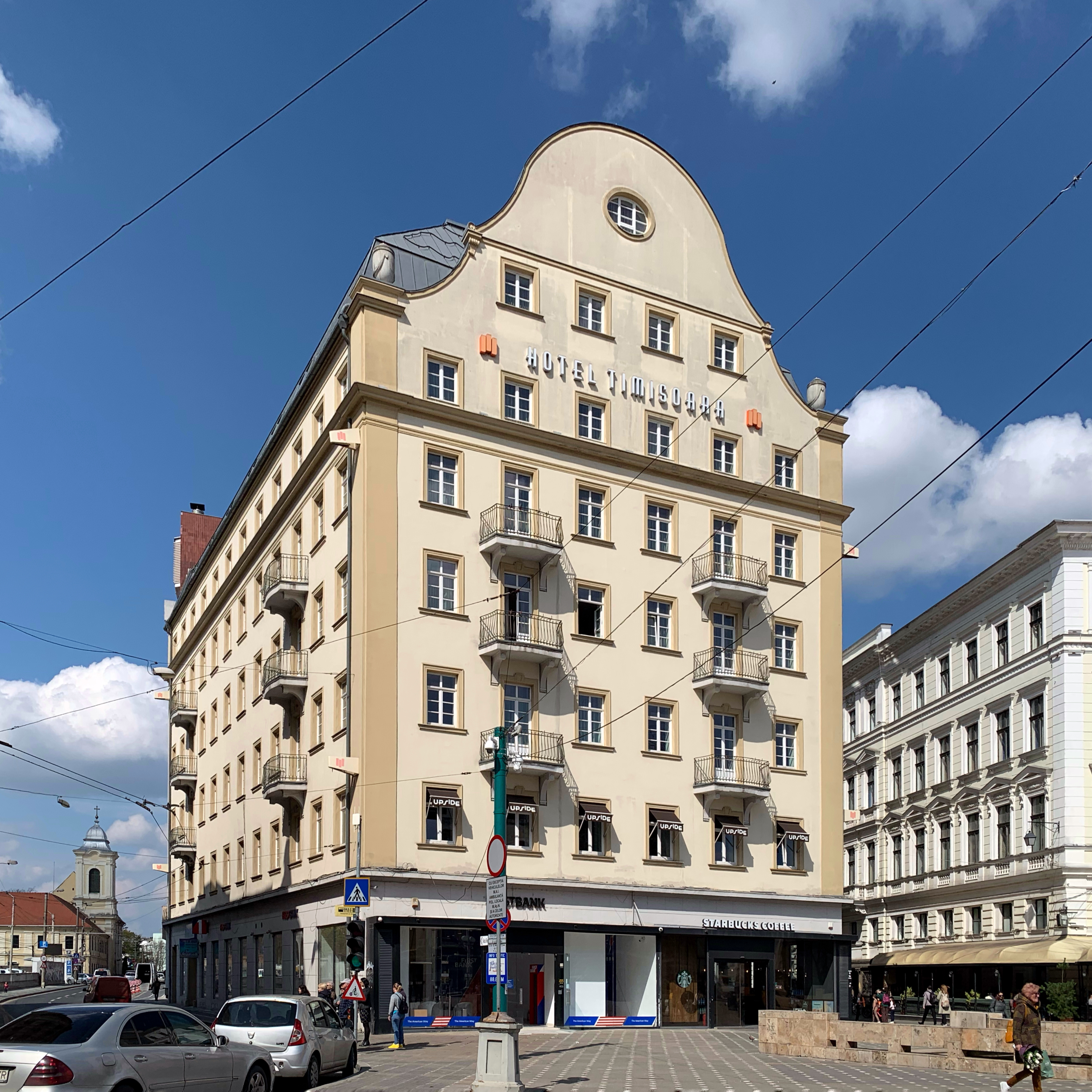
- Alternative names: Hotel Timișoara

General information
- Architectural style: International/Modernist
- Location: 1 Mărășești Street, Timișoara, Romania
- Coordinates: 45°45′15″N 21°13′31″E
- Year(s) built: 1931–1933 (old body); 1975–1978 (new body)
- Owner: Bega Turism SA

Technical details
- Floor count: 6

Design and construction
- Architect(s): László Székely, Mathias Hubert (old body); Gheorghe Gîrleanu (new body)

The Palace of the United Banat Banks (Romanian: Palatul Băncilor Bănățene Unite) is a historical building in the center of the western Romanian city of Timișoara.

== History ==
The palace, facing Victory Square, was built by a consortium of local Swabian banks, known as the United Banat Banks (German: Vereinigte Banater Banken). After 1930, the consortium asked the architects László Székely and Mathias Hubert to design an imposing six-story building for their headquarters. The building permit was obtained on 27 May 1931. It was built within two years in a manner specific to the interwar period, without many decorations, in contrast to the rest of the palaces in the square.

Since 1931, Pension Central was already operating in the palace, one of the most modern hotels in the city, taken over in 1937 by Martin Eichart. On the ground floor of the building, the Jachan bookstore operated during the interwar period, and the well-known Mercur store during the communist period.

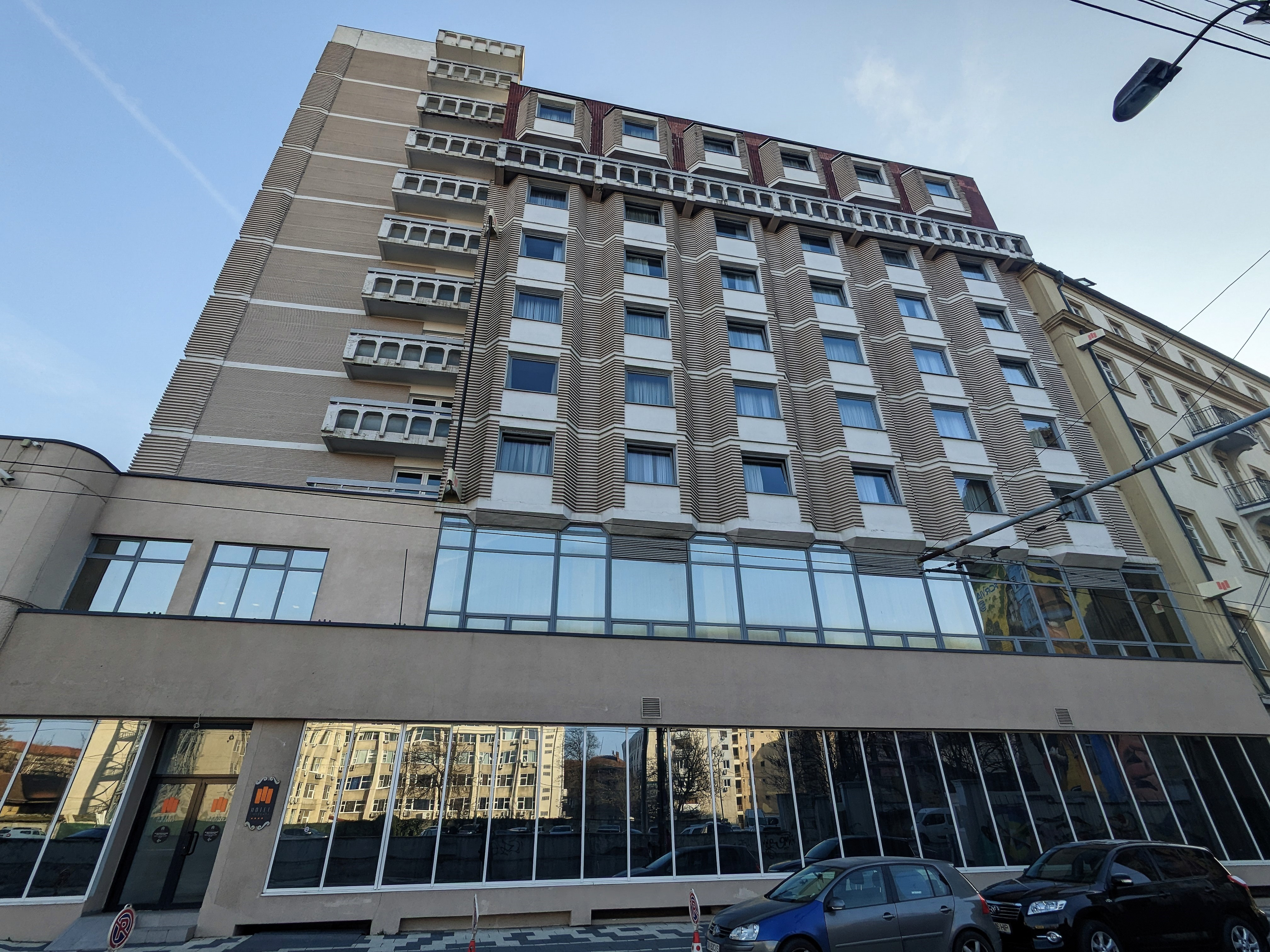
The new building of Hotel Timișoara

Between 1975 and 1978 it was expanded on the site of the former police station, which was demolished; in front of it, in the free space, an outdoor parking lot was laid out. The designer of the new body was Gheorghe Gîrleanu.

Today, the palace hosts Hotel Timișoara, a 191-room hotel owned by Bega Turism, the largest hotel operator in Timiș County.
