= House with Lions =

- Casa cu Lei
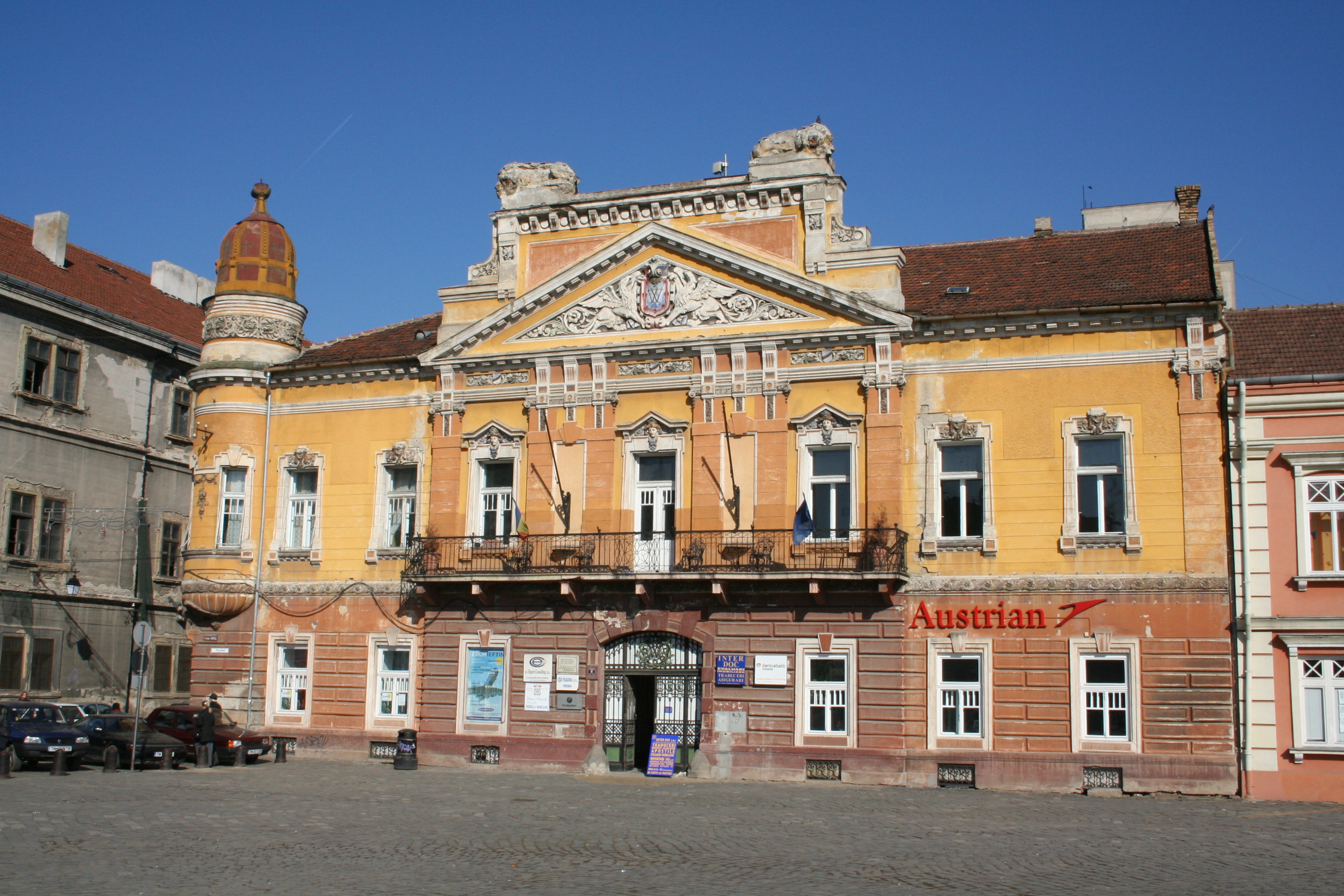
- The House with Lions in 2008
- Interactive map of the House with Lions area
- Former names: Sándor Weisz House; Lajos Weisz House

General information
- Architectural style: Secession, neo-Baroque
- Location: Union Square, Timișoara
- Coordinates: 45°45′30″N 21°13′42″E
- Completed: 1758
- Renovated: 1906

The House with Lions (Romanian: Casa cu Lei) is a neo-Baroque palace in the northwestern part of the Union Square in Timișoara, Romania. It is classified as a historical monument, being part of the urban site of Timișoara Fortress. After its former owners, the palace is also known as Lajos Weisz House or Sándor Weisz House.

== History ==
The first time that the House with Lions appears on the plans of Timișoara is in 1758. By 1818 it is known as Palick House, after the name of its owner. After 1840, the building housed in turn the Zur golden Sonne eating house (English: Golden Sun), the Zur Weißen Hund grocery store (English: White Dog) and the Zur Großen Pfeife shop (English: Big Whistle). In 1851, Angelica Palick, who inherited the house, married István Damaszkin from Beregsău Mic. He sold the house, in 1871, to businessman Sándor Weisz, who, for decades, had a famous haberdashery and wholesale business.

Lajos Weisz, one of Sándor's sons, expanded the warehouse on the ground floor and restored the facade in 1906. This is when the emblematic lions on the roof appear. During the socialist period, in the 1950s, the House with Lions was the headquarters of Siguranța (the future Securitate), the cellars being transformed into detention centers.

== Architecture ==
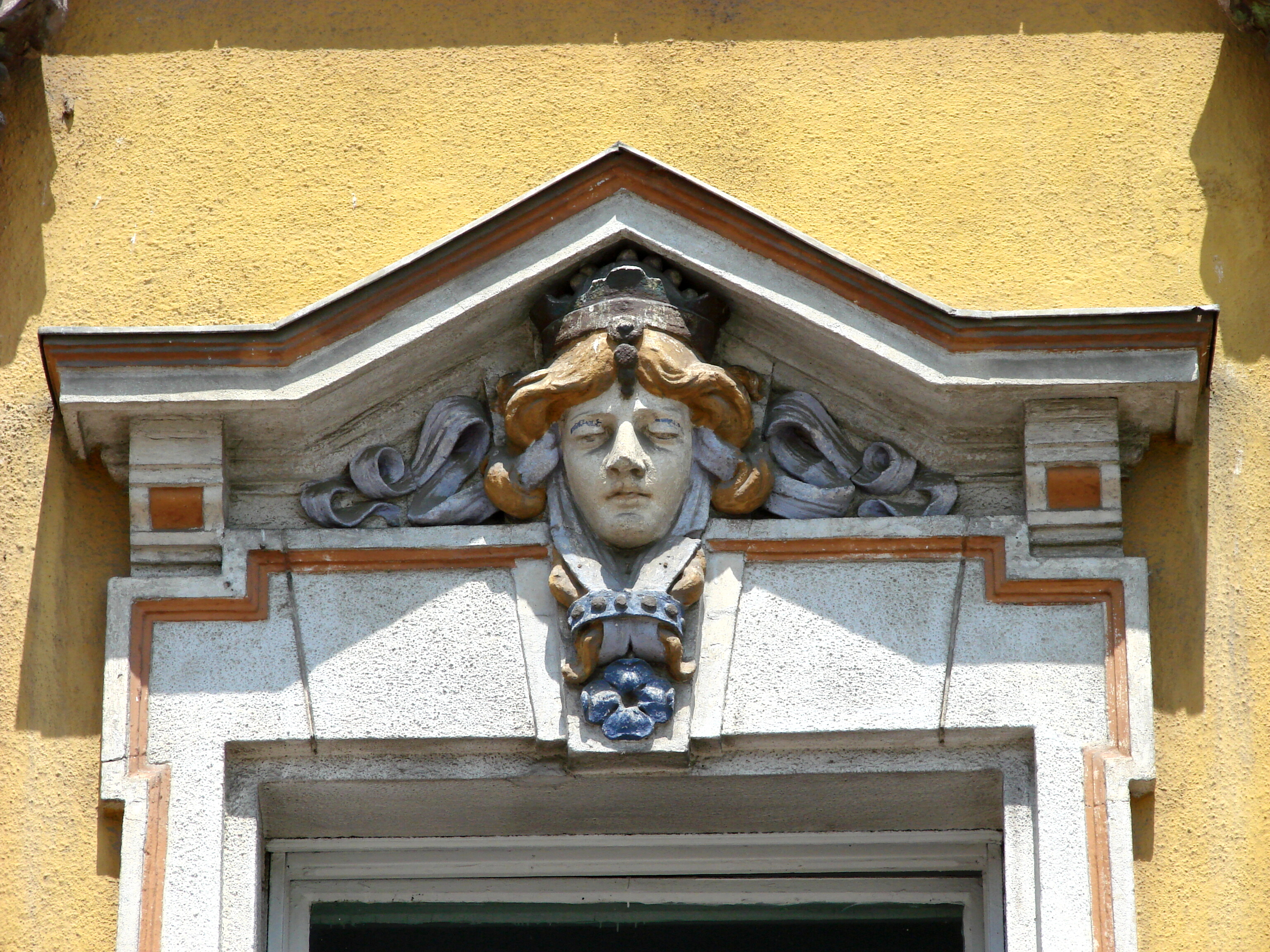
Mascaron above a window

The house was originally built in the Austrian Baroque style, the round oriel on the corner of the building existing before 1840. In 1906 the facade was redone in Secession style. The ground floor of the building forms a socle with bossages. The floor is decorated with pilasters with Ionic volutes in the upper part. Three of the central windows on the first floor are decorated with mascarons. The facade is decorated with plant motifs. At the top is a pediment in which on the shield four swords form the letter "W", the initial of Weisz. The shield is supported by griffins. The pediment is placed on an attic on which there are two life-size lions, from which the name of the house comes, but today they are 70% deteriorated.
