= House with Iron Axle =

- Casa cu Axă de Fier
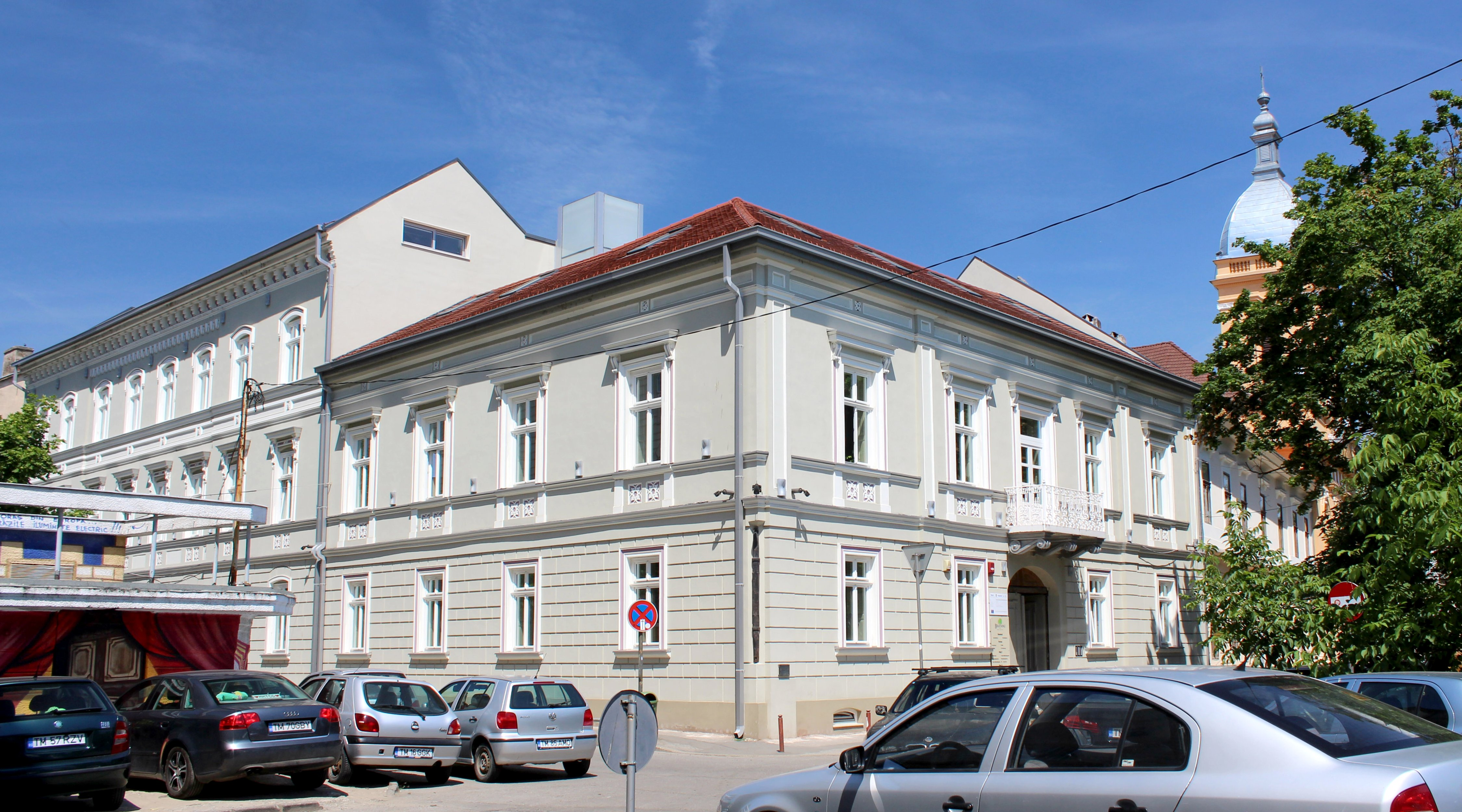
- Interactive map of the House with Iron Axle area

General information
- Architectural style: Classicist
- Location: Ion I. C. Brătianu Square, Timișoara
- Coordinates: 45°45′27″N 21°13′53″E
- Completed: 1836 (eastern body); 1838 (western body)
- Renovated: 2015

Design and construction
- Architect: Anton Schmidt (eastern body)

The House with Iron Axle (Romanian: Casa cu Axă de Fier) is a historical house, listed as a historical monument, in the Cetate district of Timișoara. It consists of two bodies, a 2.5-meter axle being mounted on the corner of the eastern body, hence the name.

== History ==
During the Ottoman rule, the Bastion of the Artillery Arsenal was located in the northeastern part of the fortifications of the Timișoara Fortress. In the northwestern part of the bastion was the Round Tower, which was located exactly where the courtyard of the House with Iron Axle is today. After the conquest of the fortress in 1716 by the Habsburg army under the command of Eugene of Savoy this tower was still used as a powder keg until 1756, when it was demolished.

In 1831 the land was parceled out, and in 1836–1838 there were already the eastern body (part of the building with one floor) at 1 Ion I. C. Brătianu Square, built by architect Anton Schmidt, and the western one (part of the building with two floors) at 1 Țepeș Vodă Square.

Between 1863 and 1864, when there was a wave of famine, a canteen for the needy operated in this house, supported by religious organizations and financed by donations.

The entire building was purchased by a company from Timișoara, which built a business center there in 2015.

== Architecture ==
Both bodies are in classicist style and have the ground floor treated as a plinth with bossages. Below the first-floor windows and below the cornice are neo-Romanesque rosettes. The windows are framed by pilasters with Corinthian capitals. Originally, the western body had triangular pediments of classicist style above the windows, but were abandoned during the 2015 restoration, the architect wanting a standardization of the appearance of the two bodies.

A 2.5-meter-long axle is mounted on the corner of the eastern building, which legend says is the axle of the battle chariot with which Eugene of Savoy entered the fortress after its conquest, on 18 October 1716. But it is known that battle chariots were not used in 1716, and Eugene of Savoy entered the conquered fortress on horseback. The axle, too long for a chariot or carriage, is one from an early 19th century heavy artillery piece.
