= Clergy's Houses, Timișoara =

Clergy's Houses
- Casele Canonicilor
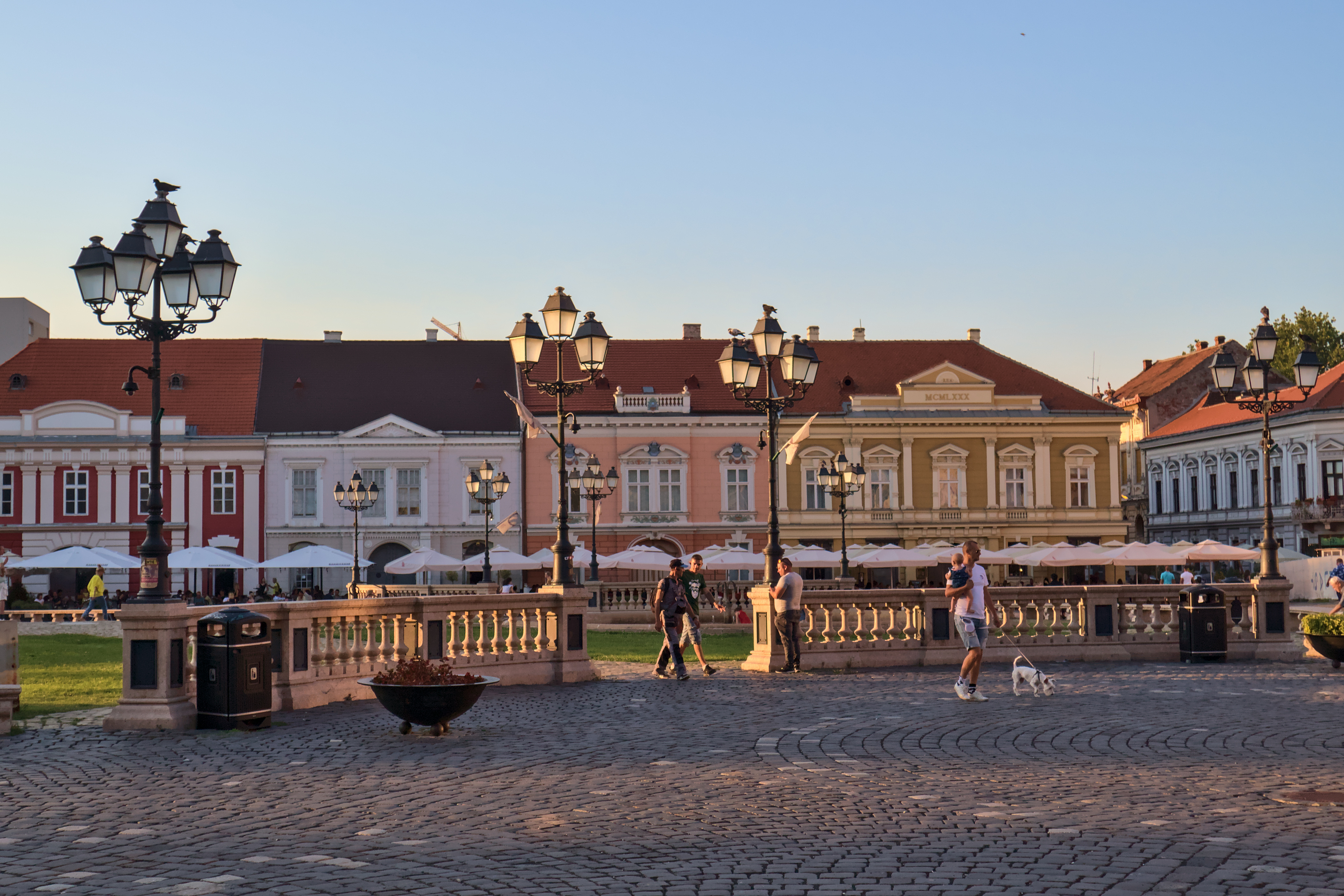

General information
- Architectural style: Classicist
- Location: Union Square, Timișoara, Romania
- Coordinates: 45.7585°N 21.2295°E
- Year built: Before 1758
- Renovated: 1980

Renovating team
- Architect: Șerban Sturdza

The Clergy's Houses (Romanian: Casele Canonicilor) are a collection of four listed buildings located on the northern side of Union Square in Timișoara, Romania, connected to one another. They have been documented since 1758, suggesting they were likely constructed before this date. In 1844, the four houses shared a single facade, which was likely damaged during the events of 1849, after which the facades were individually restored.

== Name ==
The names of the houses are given by their owners, as follows:

- 8 Union Square – Johann Szervinatz House;
- 9 Union Square – Nika (Nikola) Koszta House;
- 10 Union Square – Jakob Sorgenfrei House;
- 11 Union Square – Franz Krautwaschl House.

== History ==
As per tradition, the houses were constructed to accommodate the canons of the Roman Catholic Diocese of Cenad, who had relocated to Timișoara. Reflecting the 18th-century trend for private residences, these homes typically featured a ground floor and an upper floor, with the ground floor serving as commercial space from that time onward.

Before 1844, all four one-story houses were part of a single building with a unified facade in the Austrian Baroque style. After the siege of 1849, the building was reconstructed in a classicist style. The ground floor housed several shops and workshops. In 1828, the first house was owned by Johann Szervinatz and hosted the "Three Hussars" tavern, mentioned in 1847, and later a vinegar factory in 1852. The second building, known as the Nika Koszta House, featured the "Bale of Ardeal" tavern in 1828. In the last of the four buildings, the Krautwaschl House, the taverns "King of Greece" and "Ostrich" operated during the first half of the 19th century. Additionally, in the Clergy's Houses, the headquarters of the lawyers' association, the Wiesz store, and the editorial office of the Délmagyarországi Közlöny newspaper were located at the beginning of the 20th century.

The facades were restored in 1980 according to the plans of architect Șerban Sturdza.
