= Prince Eugene House =

- Casa Prințului Eugen
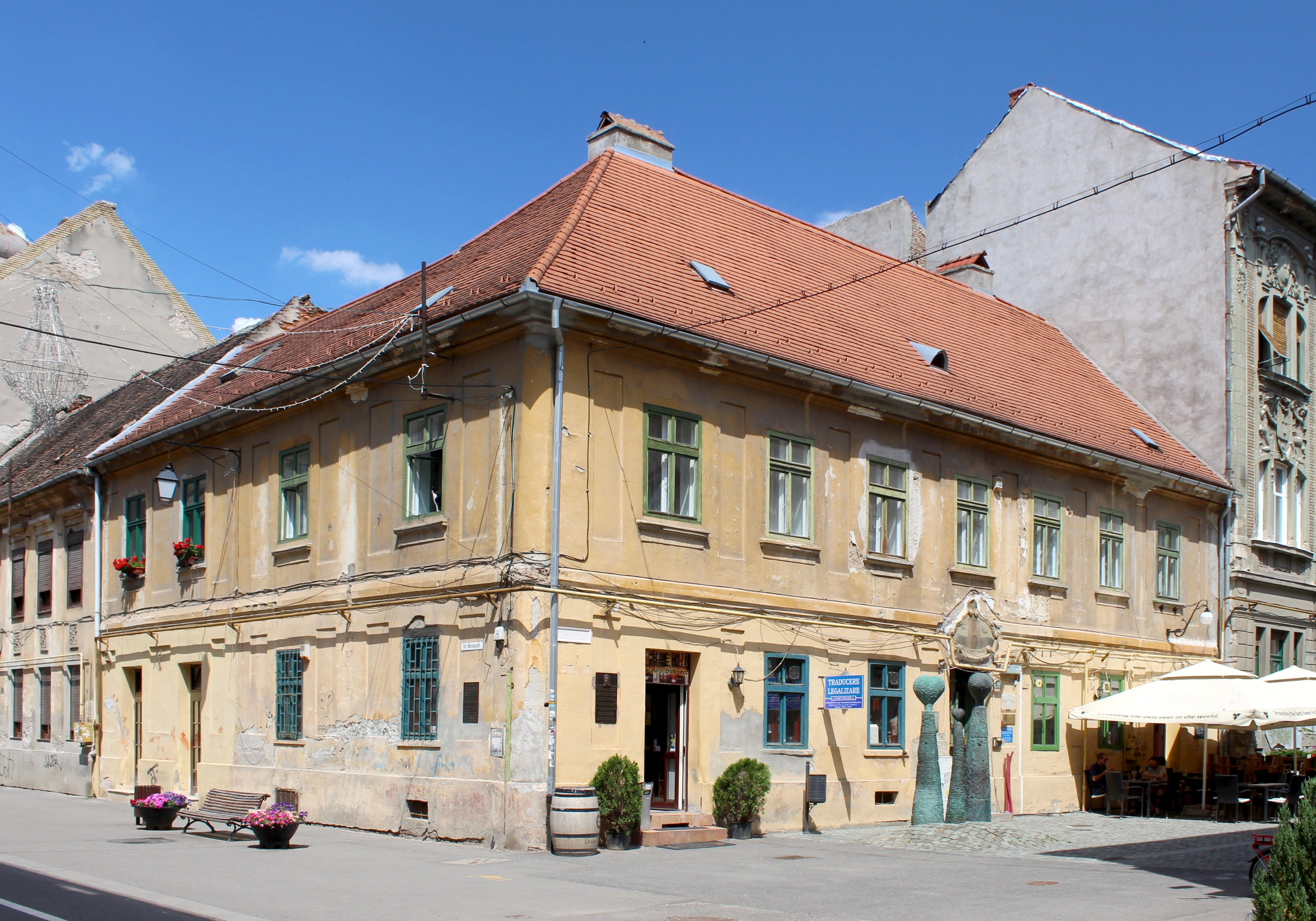
- Interactive map of the Prince Eugene House area
- Etymology: Prince Eugene of Savoy

General information
- Architectural style: Classicist
- Location: Timișoara, Romania
- Coordinates: 45°45′25″N 21°13′34″E
- Construction started: 1817

Technical details
- Material: Brick

The Prince Eugene House (Romanian: Casa Prințului Eugen) is a historical building in Timișoara, Romania, built in 1817 on the site of the Forforosa Gate, through which Eugene of Savoy entered the Timișoara Fortress on 18 October 1716, after being conquered from the Ottomans following the 1716 siege. Above the main entrance, there is a medallion with a copy of a naïve representation of the Forforosa Gate, the restored original being kept at the National Museum of Banat. Between 2015 and 2017, expert evaluations of the building's condition revealed the foundation of the Forforosa Gate beneath the east wing.

== History ==
Before 1716, on the site where now are the courtyards of the houses at 5 Eugene of Savoy Street and 8 Mărășești Street was the Rooster Gate (Horoz Kapısı in Turkish), one of the five gates of the Timișoara Fortress during the Ottoman occupation, located in its northwestern part. Contemporary descriptions place the construction date of the gate tower in the medieval period, before the conquest of 1552. The gate tower was also depicted on the coat of arms of the Banat of Temeswar. Through this gate, on 18 October 1716, Eugene of Savoy, the commander of the Habsburg army that conquered the fortress on 12 October, entered the fortress. In 1716 the gate was called Prince Eugene's Gate, and from 1727 Forforosa Gate.

After organizing the new Austrian defense system, the gate was included within the fortress walls. The gate was eventually bricked up in a rectangular building built on the site of the old Turkish ditches, as attested by the city plan of 1778. Between 1739 and 1769, the building was used by the Jewish community as a house of prayer. After an urban renewal, it was demolished in 1817 together with the Forforosa Gate. From the resulting bricks, Prince Eugen House was built in the so-called Jewish quarter. During the construction of the house, its owner received the task from the municipality to place above the entrance the bas-relief in which the image of the old gate is depicted. In 1828, the building was standing in its current form, with a built-up area of 90 klafters (c. 324 m^{2}). Despite the name, Eugene of Savoy never lived in the house, it being built 81 years after his death.

In 1829, Michael Zacher, who had bought the old building in 1804 and built the new one, sold it to Michael Moran for 19,000 florins. Over time, the building passed to various owners by exchange, inheritance or purchase. In 1909, the widow of Sebastian Savici (Savić) obtained approval for alterations to the building. In the interwar period, shops selling vegetables, fruit, milk and bread operated in the building, then they were replaced by a restaurant and a pub. In 1934, the premises were transformed into the General Bureau of Commerce, Industry and Agriculture, and from 1946 into the Theater Agency. The nationalization of 1948 stopped any private initiative. After 1990, the building was returned to the descendants of the Savici family.

== Architecture ==
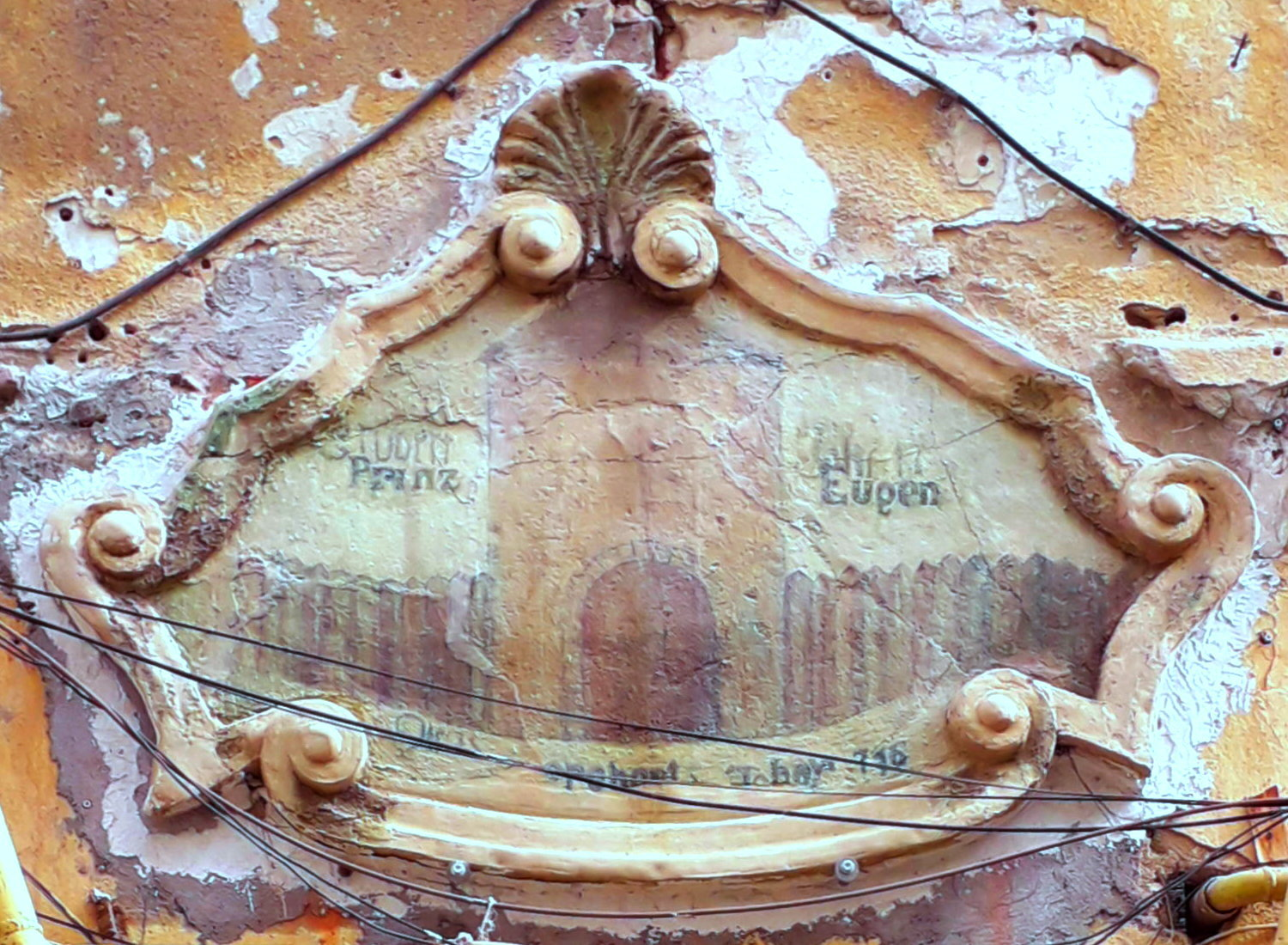
Stucco medallion above the entrance with a reproduction of the old Forforosa Gate, demolished in 1817

The house is a corner building with a floor and an attic, organized according to a U-shaped plan, with the main façade on Eugene of Savoy Street and a side façade on Mărășești Street, both pedestrian. The body on the southern front and the other two wings delimit a small inner courtyard, with an almost square shape. The building preserves the way of organization specific to the 18th and 19th centuries, with a symmetrical solution to the access corridor, a balanced staircase leading to the first floor and a distribution of circulation in the rooms on the first floor through an access deck in console.

The exterior façades are simple. The summary decorations (profiles at the cornice) and geometric bossages are classicist. The plinths of the windows have doubled edges, a baroque element.
