= Löffler Palace =

Historic building in Timișoara, Romania

- Palatul Löffler
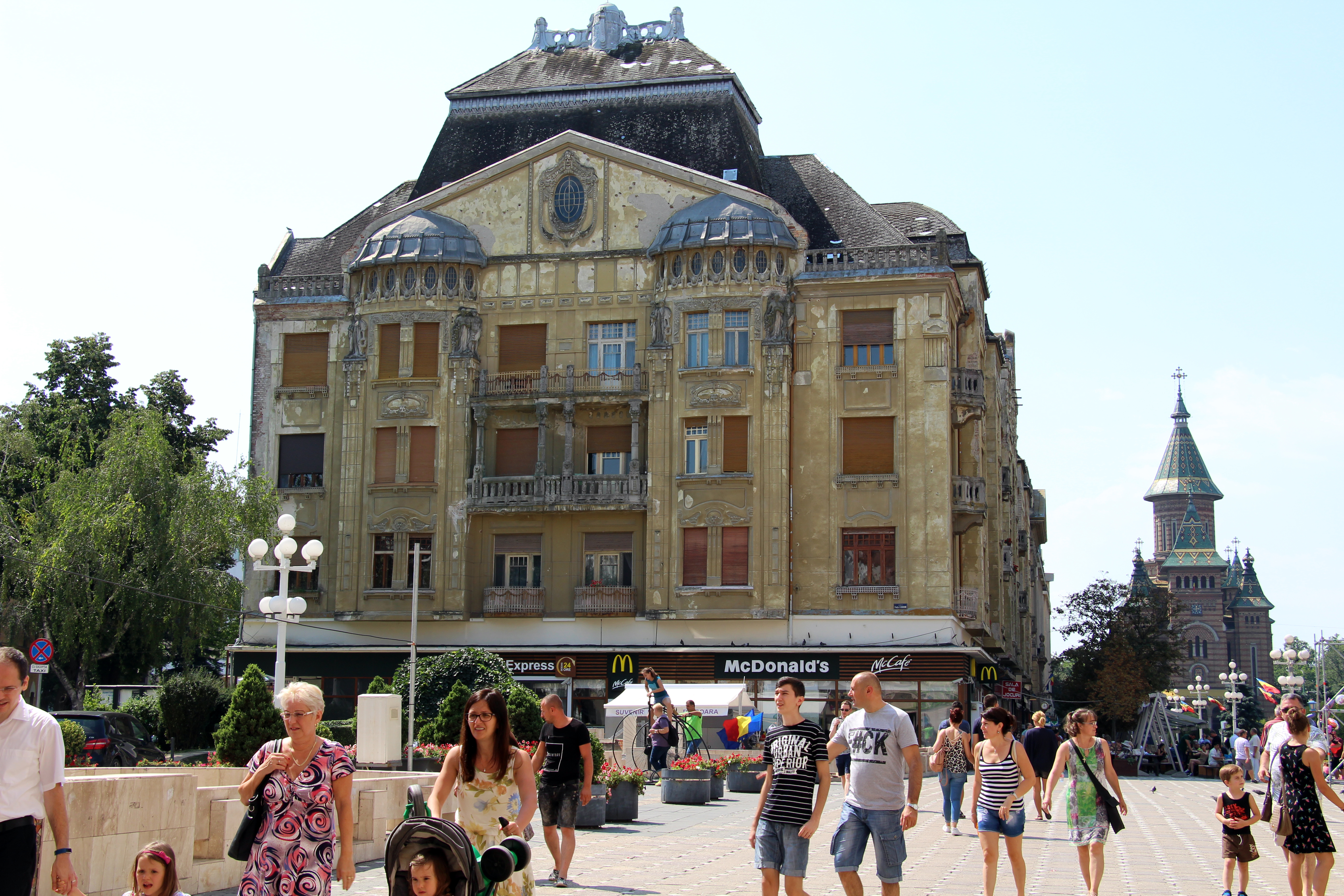
- The Löffler Palace in 2018, with bullet holes from the Romanian Revolution still visible on the triangular pediment facing the Opera House
- Interactive map of the Löffler Palace area

General information
- Architectural style: Secession
- Location: Victory Square, Timișoara
- Coordinates: 45°45′11″N 21°13′33″E
- Construction started: 1912
- Completed: 1913

Design and construction
- Architect: Leopold Löffler

The Löffler Palace (Romanian: Palatul Löffler) is a historic building in Timișoara, Romania, on the Surogat side of the Victory Square. It was built between 1912 and 1913 by the family and company of the entrepreneur Jacob Löffler, as a company headquarters and home for him and his three sons.

== History ==
The Löffler Palace is the first building on Surogat, between the Opera House and Huniade Castle. It belongs to the szecesszió current, and the architect of the building was Leopold Löffler, one of the three sons of the family of grain merchants once living in the palace. Together with father Jacob, they decided to buy a plot of land cleared after the demolition of Timișoara Fortress and parceled for sale. When purchasing the building plot, Löffler was subject to conditions from the city administration, so the construction time had to be less than a year, and the architectural design, especially the facades, had to be approved by the chief architect of the city, László Székely. In addition, the rear of the building had to be structurally separated from the Huniade Castle behind it and further developed. Here the building was richly decorated, including with two groups of statues. The statues were probably made by the sculptor Géza Rubletzky.

The palace was designed with three staircases, one for each of Jacob Löffler's sons, and had three floors, 46 apartments and 142 rooms. The apartments were also intended for rent and became, in a short time, very sought after, given the excellent position of the building. The palace has three entrances, because each of Löffler's sons wanted to have a separate entrance to the palace. A cafe was opened on the ground floor and, in a short time, numerous commercial or production spaces were rented. In 1948 the building was nationalized, and Löffler's last son died in a ruined attic on the middle staircase, where he had been banished by the new communist power.

Over the years, the palace hosted various institutions, as well as numerous shops on the ground floor. The Hermes Exchange Bank, the Mortgage Credit Bank, the General Directorate of Railways, the branch of the French Institute of Higher Studies in Romania and the Bulevard café, on the ground floor, operated here alternately.

== Architecture ==
In addition to its monumentality, the building impresses with the decorative wealth of the facades, especially with the presence of numerous large statues attached to the short facades, the work of sculptor Géza Rubletzky. The rhythm of the facades is marked by semicircular bay windows, joined by loggias and rows of balconies and decorated with geometric and anthropomorphic motifs specific to the Secession movement. Decorative panels with mascarons, stylized representations of the motif of the angel or the Green Man, geometrically treated pilaster capitals or gravel plastering decorations on the balconies and attics are noteworthy in this regard. The volumetric play of the roof is an extremely complex one, defined by wide pediments that frame the semi-dome roofs of the bay windows on the short side, and on the long side they are framed in turn by their roofs, slope breaks and tinsmithing details. The building, of monumental dimensions, is composed of a basement, a commercial ground floor that also functions as a plinth for the entire building, furnished for the rest with three floors intended for apartments for rent.
