= King Ferdinand I Boulevard =

Boulevard in Timișoara, Romania

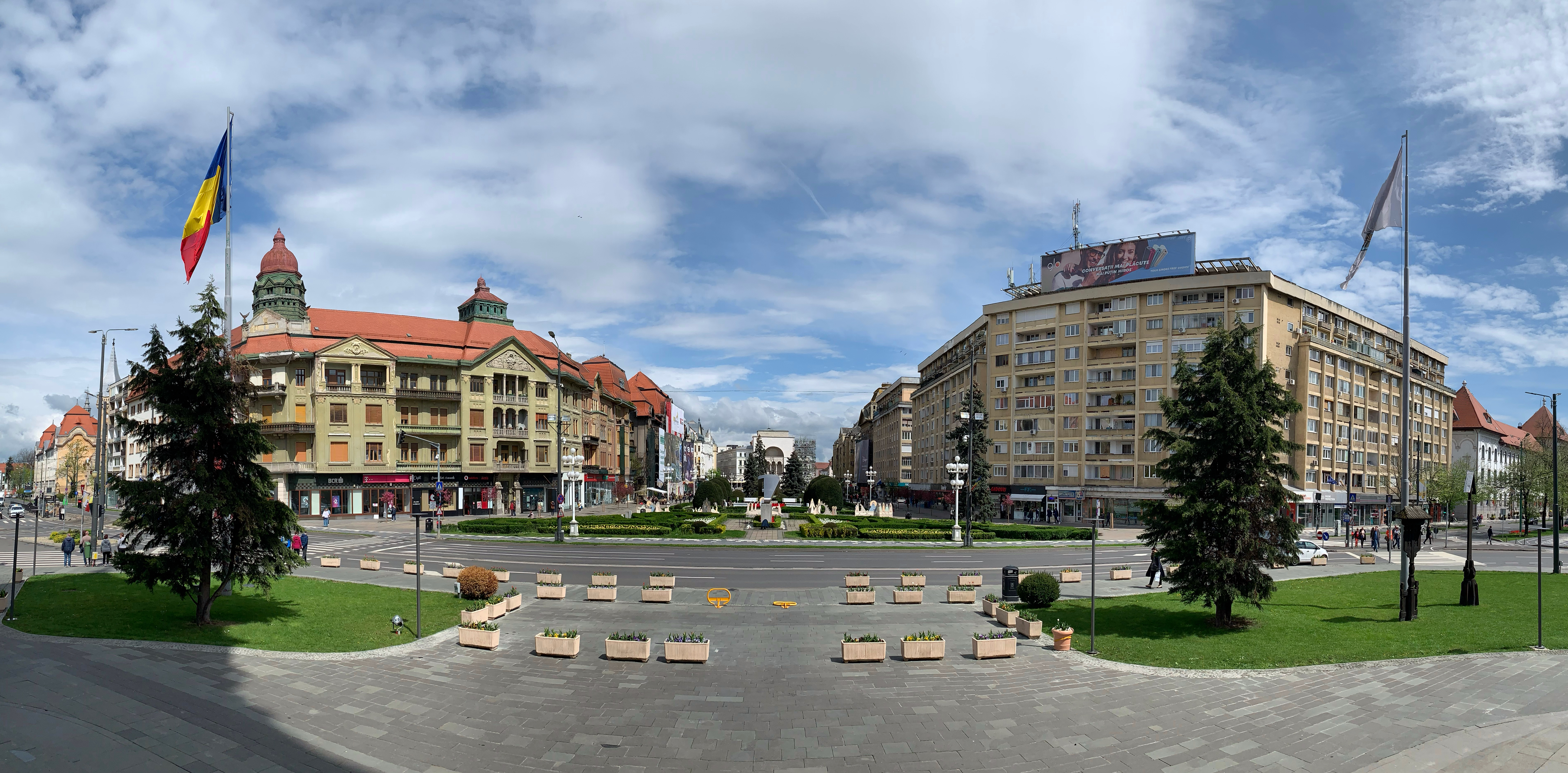
- King Ferdinand I Boulevard and Victory Square
- Native name: Bulevardul Regele Ferdinand I (Romanian)
- Former name(s): Politehnicii, Napoleon, Prince Nicholas
- Maintained by: Timișoara City Hall
- Length: 561.15 m (1,841.0 ft)
- Location: Cetate, Timișoara, Romania
- Coordinates: 45°45′5″N 21°13′25″E
- From: Queen Marie Square
- To: Michael the Brave Bridge

King Ferdinand I Boulevard (Romanian: Bulevardul Regele Ferdinand I) is a boulevard in Timișoara, Romania. It begins at Queen Marie Square, passes by the Metropolitan Cathedral, then crosses the Bega Canal via Michael the Brave Bridge, continuing onward as Michael the Brave Boulevard. The boulevard forms the northern edge of Victory Square, which was redesigned in the early 20th century following the dismantling of Timișoara's fortress walls.

The area is renowned for its elegant early 20th-century architecture, with landmarks such as Lloyd Palace, Weiss Palace, Neuhausz, Merbl, Dauerbach, Hilt-Vogel, and Széchenyi Palaces lining the square, all showcasing Art Nouveau and eclectic styles. Adjacent to the boulevard are two major parks: Cathedral Park, established in 1967 behind the cathedral and stretching along the Bega Canal, and Central Park, founded in 1870 on the site of a former cemetery, known for its monuments and shaded paths.
