= King Michael I Boulevard =

Boulevard in Timișoara, Romania

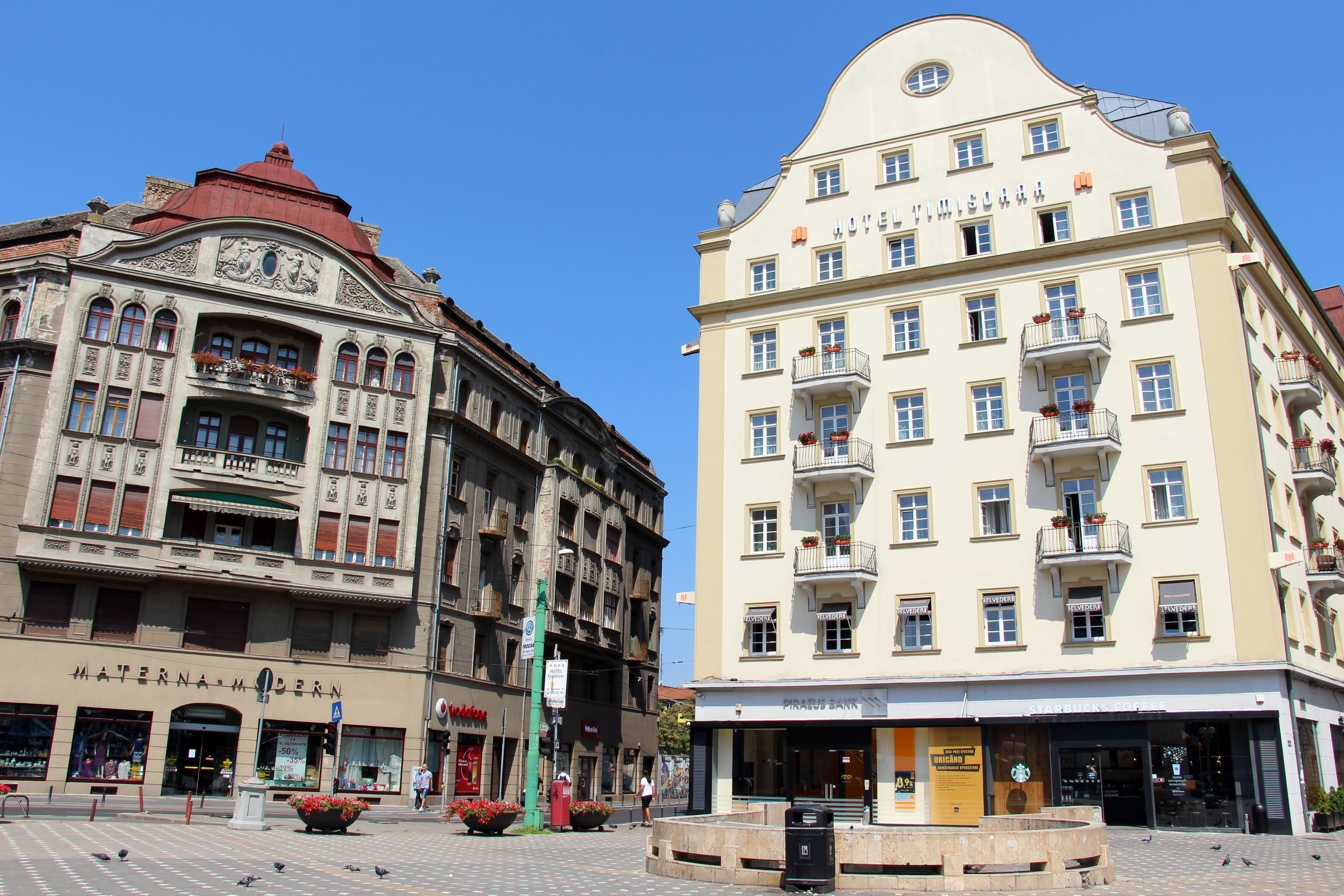
- King Michael I Boulevard with Weiss Palace (left) and Hotel Timișoara (right)
- Native name: Bulevardul Regele Mihai I (Romanian)
- Former name(s): Republic Boulevard
- Maintained by: Timișoara City Hall
- Location: Cetate, Timișoara, Romania
- Coordinates: 45.7550°N 21.2250°E
- From: Queen Marie Square
- To: Mărăști Square

King Michael I Boulevard (Romanian: Bulevardul Regele Mihai I) is a boulevard in Timișoara, Romania. It starts from Queen Marie Square, crosses the historic center to the west, and ends in Mărăști Square, near the Botanical Park. From 1947 to 2019, it was known as Republic Boulevard, when it was renamed in honor of the last king of Romania, Michael I. Today, the name "Republic Boulevard" applies only to the stretch between Timișoara North railway station and Queen Marie Square. Notably, King Michael I was the founder of the Metropolitan Cathedral and other cultural and academic institutions in Timișoara, including the Romanian National Opera, the Banat Philharmonic, the West University, the University of Medicine and Pharmacy, and the University of Life Sciences.
