= 20 December 1989 Street =

Road in Timișoara, Romania

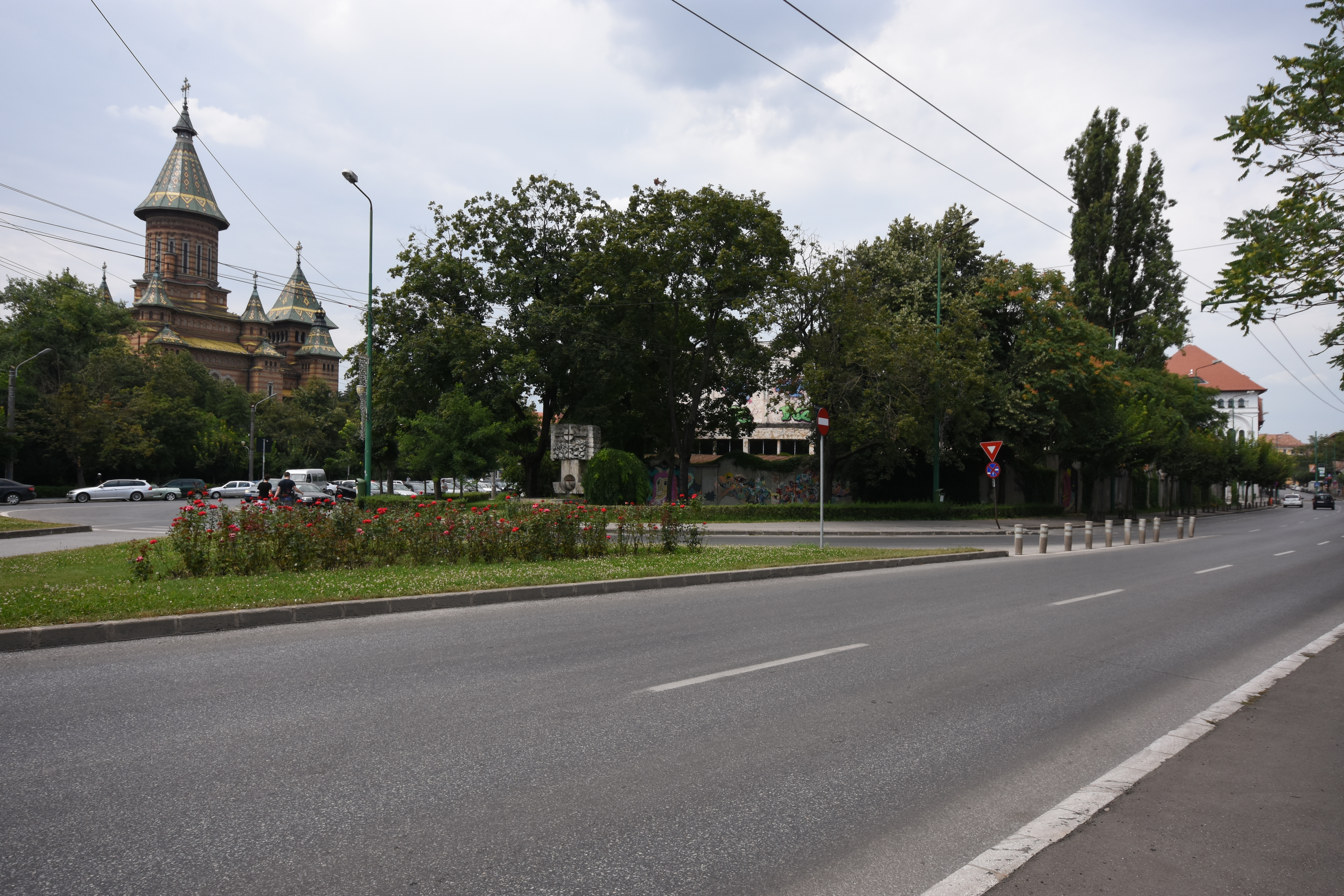
- 20 December 1989 Street with the Metropolitan Cathedral and the City Hall in the background
- Interactive map of 20 December 1989 Street
- Native name: 20 Decembrie 1989 (Romanian)
- Former name: Săvinești
- Maintained by: Timișoara City Hall
- Length: 528.83 m (1,735.0 ft)
- Location: Cetate, Timișoara, Romania
- Coordinates: 45°45′5″N 21°13′38″E
- From: John Hunyadi Square
- To: Michael the Brave Bridge

20 December 1989 Street (Romanian: Strada 20 Decembrie 1989) is a main thoroughfare in Timișoara, Romania. It stretches between John Hunyadi Square and Michael the Brave Bridge where it joins King Ferdinand I Boulevard. It is named after the day when Timișoara became the first city in Romania free from communism.

Along the boulevard are, on the left side, the Banat Philharmonic, the City Hall and the Hunyadi Castle, and on the right side, the Justice Park, the former Israelite High School and the Emanoil Ungureanu Technical College.
