= Capitoline Wolf, Timișoara =

Heritage site in Timiș County, Romania

Capitoline Wolf
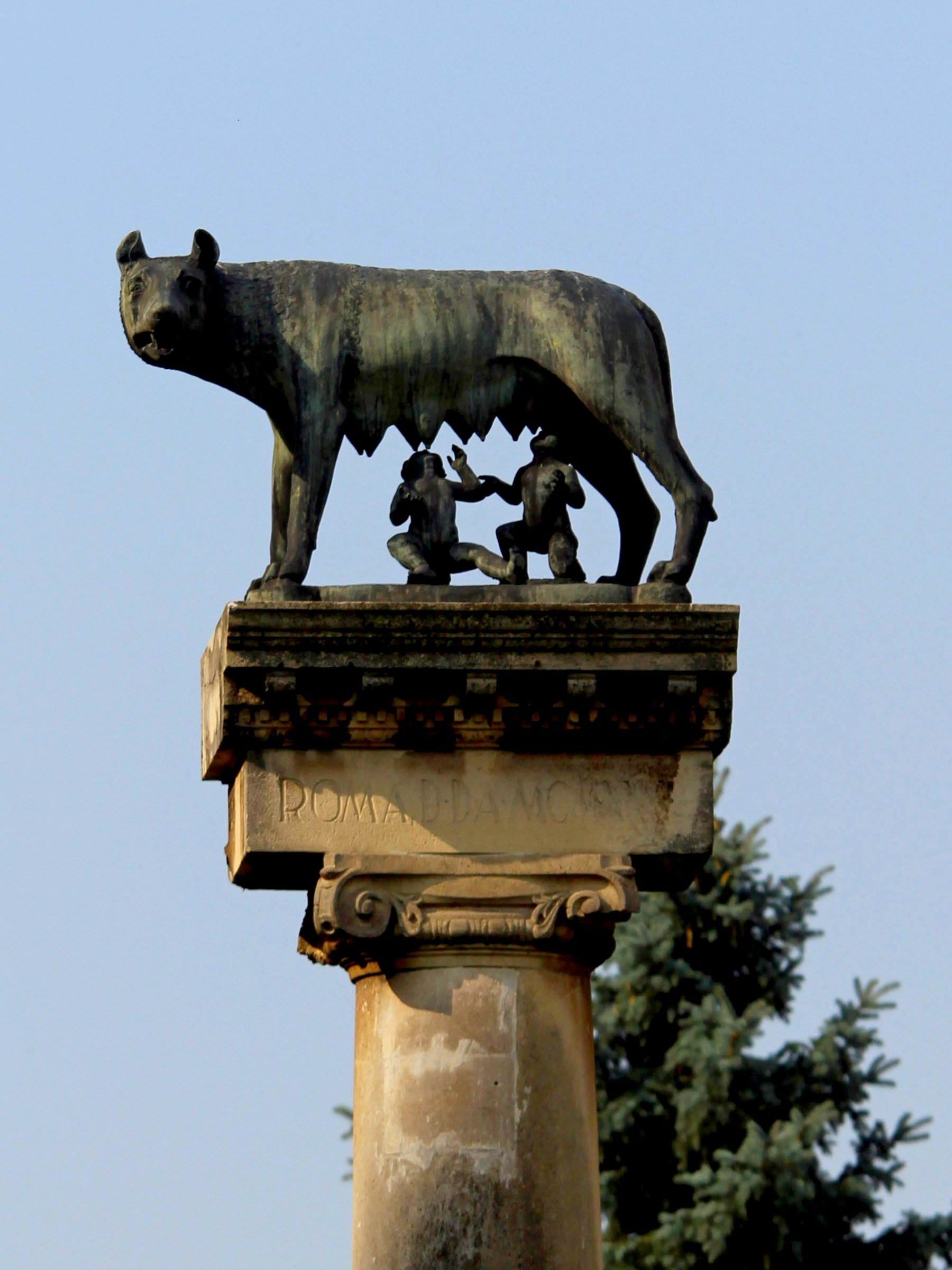
- Location: Victory Square, Timișoara
- Coordinates: 45°45′8″N 21°13′30″E
- Type: Statue
- Material: Bronze
- Height: 4.96 m
- Opening date: 23 April 1926
- LMI code: TM-III-m-B-06314

Capitoline Wolf is a statue located in Timișoara's Victory Square, between the Metropolitan Cathedral and the Palace of Culture. Copy of the famous Capitoline Wolf, the statue was donated by the municipality of Rome in 1926 as a symbol of Latinity that glorifies the Roman Empire culture of that period. The statue depicts the legend of the founders of Rome, the brothers Romulus and Remus, suckled by a she-wolf. The statue is inscribed in the list of historical monuments with the code TM-III-m-B-06314.

== Description ==
Made of bronze, the statue is a copy of the famous Capitoline Wolf, today on display in the Capitoline Museums in Rome, and is placed on a 4.96-meter-high socle imitating an ancient column.

== History ==
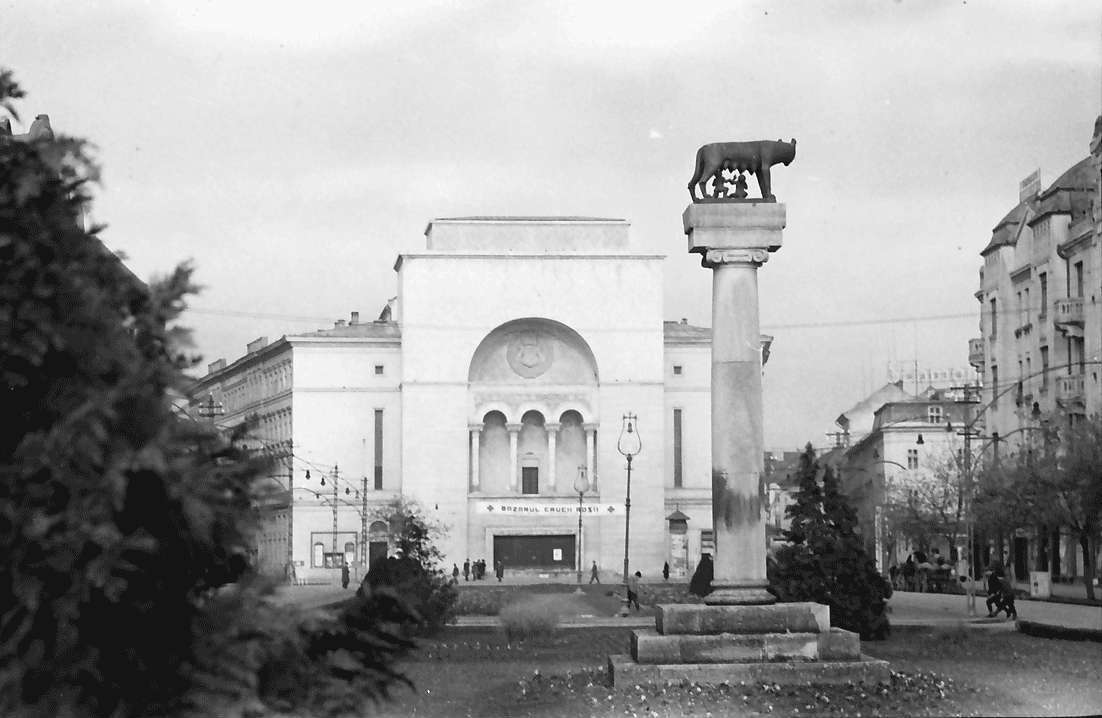
The "she-wolf with cubs" in 1937

Between 1906 and 1926, the Italian state gave Romania four copies of the statue as a sign of recognition of the Latin origin of the Romanian people and the ties between the two peoples. The first statue was donated to Bucharest on the 1800th anniversary of the conquest of Dacia and the 25th anniversary of the reign of Carol I as king of Romania. The other three arrived in Cluj and Chișinău in 1921 and in Timișoara in 1926. It was the first monument unveiled in Timișoara after the creation of Greater Romania.

The monument was unveiled on St. George's Day, 23 April 1926, in the presence of 10,000 people. The event was also attended by Samuil Șagovici, the then mayor of the city, Vasile Goldiș, the minister of Cults, Grigore Trancu-Iași, the minister of Labor, but also representatives of the National Fascist Party. The handover was made by Giulio Cesare Codecà, appointed in 1922 consular agent of Italy in Timișoara, with jurisdiction throughout the Romanian Banat. The solemnity took place with the total exclusion from any role of the former mayor of Timișoara, Lucian Georgevici, who was forced to resign on 17 April, in a tense climate.

The statue was removed during World War II, after Romania turned its weapons against the Axis powers, with which it went to war. The Romanians from Timișoara decided to protest against Fascist Italy led by Mussolini, which supported Hungary to obtain Northern Transylvania. In Banat's speech, it was shouted then Duce, duce, ia-ți cățaua și ți-o fuce ("Duke, duke, take your bitch and fuck her"), alluding to Benito Mussolini's nickname, Il Duce. During Nicolae Ceaușescu's time, local officials decided to put the statue back in its place in the center of Timișoara.
