= Michael the Brave Boulevard =

Boulevard in Timișoara, Romania

- Native name: Bulevardul Mihai Viteazul (Romanian)
- Former name(s): Püspök út
- Maintained by: Timișoara City Hall
- Length: 773.63 m (2,538.2 ft)
- Location: Elisabetin, Timișoara, Romania
- Coordinates: 45°44′40″N 21°13′32″E
- From: Michael the Brave Bridge
- To: Nicolae Bălcescu Square

Michael the Brave Boulevard (Romanian: Bulevardul Mihai Viteazul) is a boulevard in Timișoara, Romania. It is a continuation of King Ferdinand I Boulevard and ends in Nicolae Bălcescu Square, the core of the Elisabetin district. Notably, in its eastern part is the campus of the Politehnica University.

== History ==
During the Austro-Hungarian period, the street was known as Püspök út (Bishop's Street). Its development commenced in the late 19th and early 20th centuries, a time marked by Timișoara's expansion beyond the limits of the former fortress and a broader transition toward civic and urban modernization. Initially defined by its tranquil, residential character and preferred by the upper-middle class, the street gradually evolved into a prominent urban corridor, distinguished by architectural styles characteristic of the Secession (Art Nouveau) movement and, subsequently, the interwar modernist period.

Following the incorporation of Banat into the Romanian state in 1919, the street was renamed in honor of Michael the Brave, the first ruler to achieve the unification of the Romanian principalities in 1600—a renaming that reflected the newly emerging national identity and historical consciousness.

== Monuments ==
This boulevard forms a notable urban ensemble, highlighted by architectural continuity and stylistic coherence. It is home to several protected historic buildings, including:

No.	Image	Name	Year(s) built	Notes
1		Székely House	1908–1909	It housed the personal office of László Székely, Timișoara's chief city architect.
3		Mühle House	1909–1910	It belonged to famed florists Wilhelm and Árpád Mühle.
28		Mechanical Faculty Complex	1923	Designed in the Brâncovenesc style, it includes the Faculty of Mechanics, student canteen, and dormitory.
