= Neuhaus Palace =

- Palatul Neuhaus
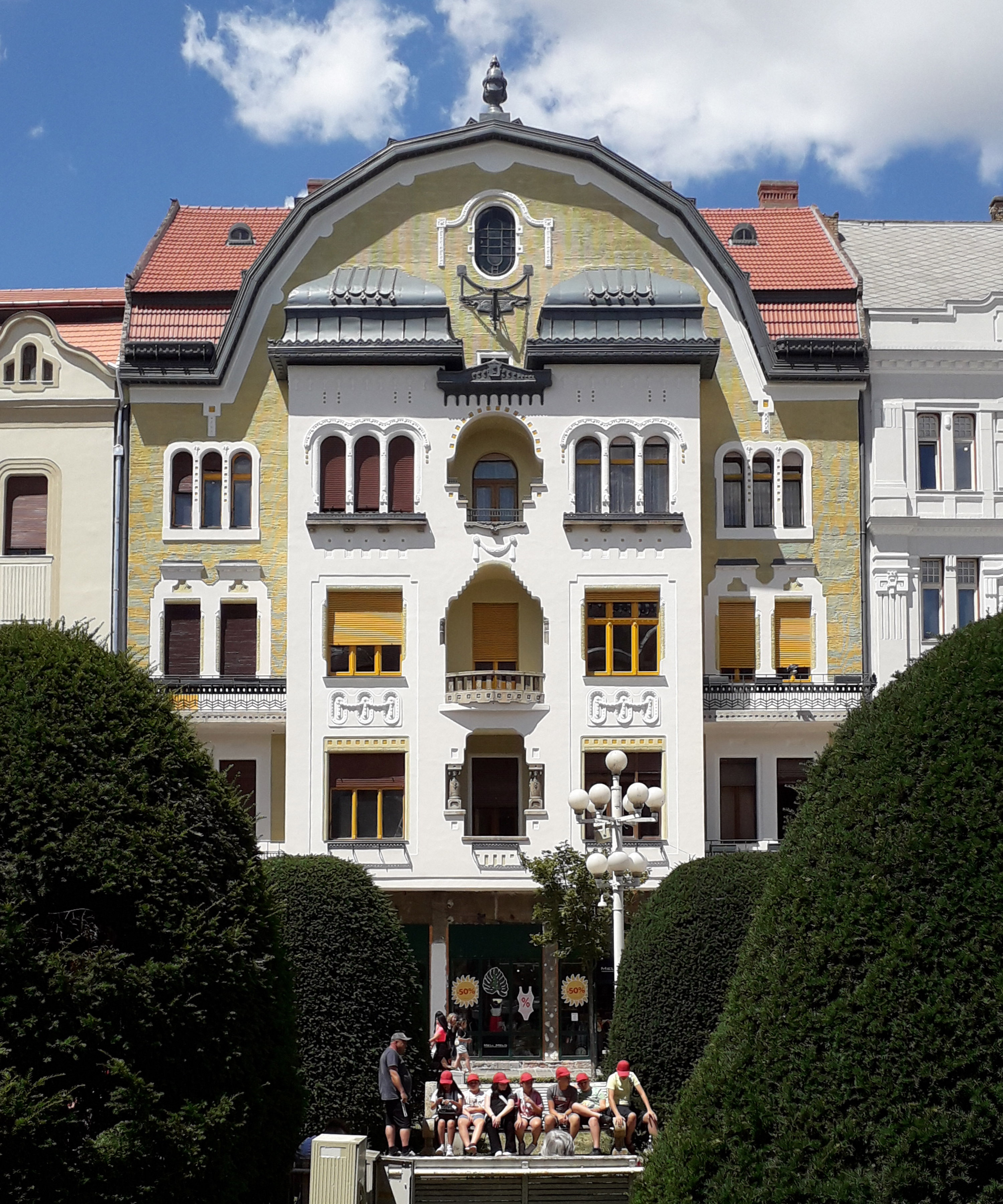
- Interactive map of the Neuhaus Palace area
- Alternative names: Färber Palace

General information
- Architectural style: Secession
- Location: Victory Square, Timișoara
- Coordinates: 45°45′12.01″N 21°13′29.6″E
- Construction started: 1910
- Completed: 1912
- Renovated: 2022
- Owner: John Farber

Technical details
- Floor count: 4

Design and construction
- Architect: László Székely

Website
- palatul-neuhausz.ro

The Neuhaus Palace (often written in its Hungarianized form Neuhausz) is a historic building in the Victory Square of Timișoara, Romania.

== History ==
The palace lies in a continuous front of monumental Secession buildings, between the Lloyd Palace and the Merbl Palace. It was built between 1910–1912 by local entrepreneur Ernő Neuhausz and designed by László Székely, the chief architect of Timișoara at that time. In 1917, Ernő Neuhausz sold the building to the then well-known Färber family, who kept the building until the 1950s, when it was nationalized and the family had to emigrate due to the communist regime. Members of the Färber family are still the owners of some spaces in the building, which they managed to get back after 1990.

The Freund family lived in the Färber Palace in the 1940s and 1950s with their son, Peter, who became a physicist. After the war, conductor and composer Ladislau Roth lived here with his family.

== Architecture ==
Neuhaus Palace is a symmetrical building. The plasticity of the facade is specific to the second manifestation of the Secession movement in the architecture of Timișoara, with geometric and simplified decorations. Noteworthy is the oversized pediment, awning of the two oversized bay windows covered with a copper roof and joined by a series of loggias. On the ground floor of the four-story building are commercial spaces.
