= Hilt-Vogel Palace =

- Palatul Hilt-Vogel
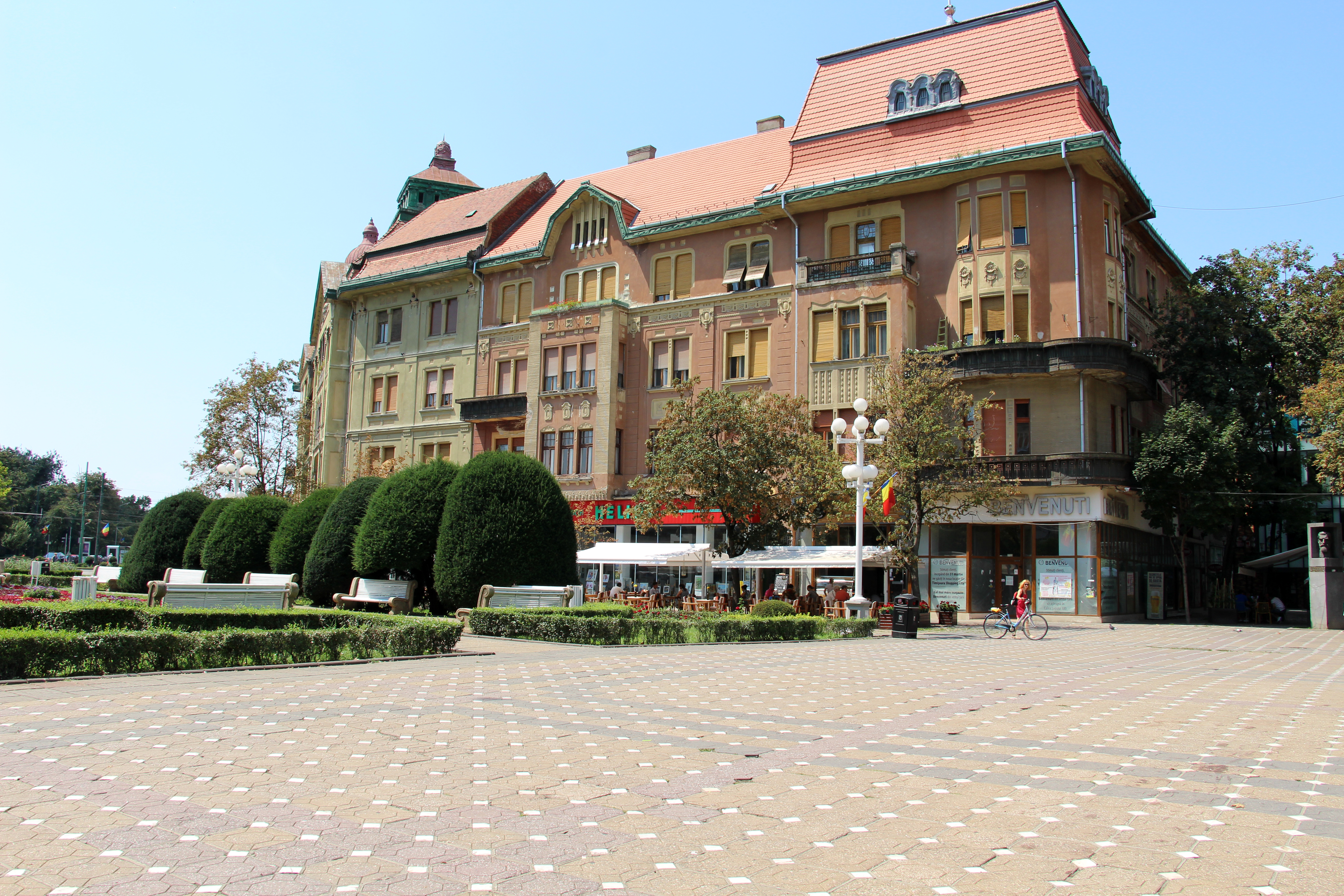
- Alternative names: Hilt Palace

General information
- Architectural style: Secession
- Location: Victory Square, Timișoara
- Coordinates: 45°45′7″N 21°13′27″E
- Construction started: 1911
- Completed: 1913

Technical details
- Material: Brick, reinforced concrete

Design and construction
- Architect: László Székely

The Hilt-Vogel Palace (Romanian: Palatul Hilt-Vogel) is a historic building in Victory Square in Timișoara, Romania. It was built between 1911 and 1913, according to the plans of Hungarian architect László Székely. The building is attached to the Széchényi Palace, designed by the same architect.

On the ground floor of the building is the Helios art gallery (former art gallery of the Timișoara Plastic Fund), moved here in 1968. Over the years it has hosted over 1,000 exhibitions of visual artists from Timișoara, including Péter Jecza, Adalbert Luca, Ștefan Bertalan, Julius Podlipny and Romul Nuțiu.

== History ==
In 1911, Lajos Hilt, in partnership with the company Antal Vogel & Co., purchased a 600-square-fathom plot of land from the city hall for a total of 200,000 crowns. The property was situated at the southern end of the newly developed Franz Joseph Boulevard, then the most fashionable area in the city. The owners later divided the land into two separate plots, with the northern portion allocated to Lajos Hilt.

At the end of 1911, Lajos Hilt received a building permit for a three-story apartment building, designed to include 10 apartments and a total of 37 rooms. In October 1912, he was granted approval to install both a passenger elevator and a freight elevator, primarily intended for transporting coal. Construction was completed in 1913.

== Architecture ==
The building's architecture reflects the Art Nouveau style, specifically the szecesszió movement. It is constructed using brick, reinforced concrete, iron, and features tin and copper elements, particularly in the balcony parapets. A striking feature is the treatment of the corner, emphasized by a break in the roof's slope to create a raised section. Other notable elements include the two-story bay windows and the eaves interrupted by polygonal gables. However, the most distinctive feature is the corner balconies, designed with complex, dynamic shapes. Geometric motifs dominate the decorative elements, often arranged in groups of three.
