= Merbl Palace =

- Palatul Merbl
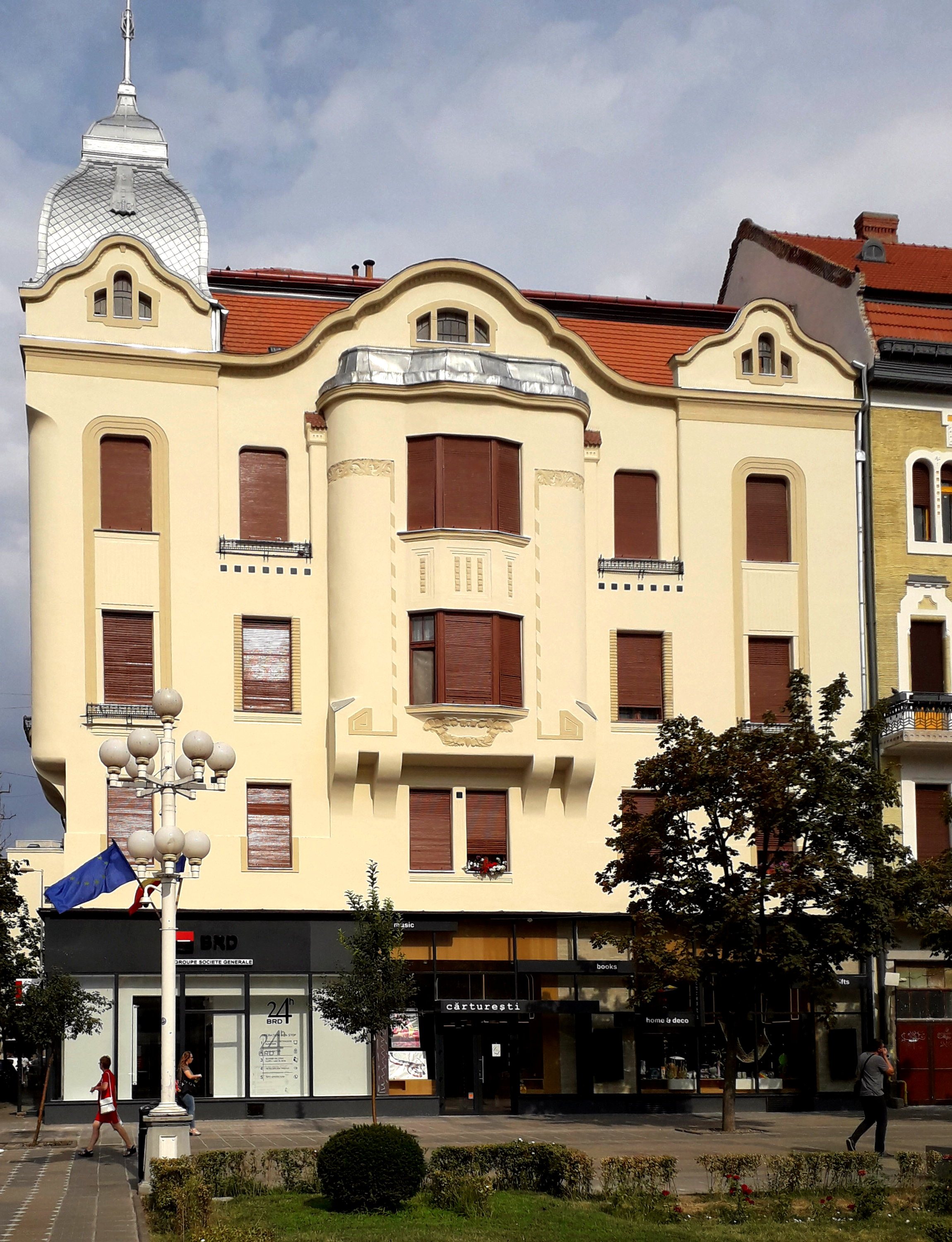
- Interactive map of the Merbl Palace area

General information
- Architectural style: Secession, Baroque
- Location: Victory Square, Timișoara
- Coordinates: 45°45′11″N 21°13′29″E
- Completed: 1911

Technical details
- Floor count: 3

Design and construction
- Architect: Arnold Merbl

The Merbl Palace (Romanian: Palatul Merbl) is a monumental building in the Victory Square of Timișoara, Romania. It is part of the Corso interwar urban ensemble, listed as a historical monument of national importance.

== History ==
The Merbl Palace was built in 1911, in the Secession style with baroque elements, according to the plans of Arnold Merbl, the builder of the Lloyd Palace in the same square. The Neuhaus Palace alternates between the two. He had purchased a plot of 226.7 square fathoms a year earlier for the construction of the palace. The building permit was issued in the spring of 1911 and provided for a report palace consisting of nine apartments and 44 rooms.

Merbl was an important builder from Timișoara, his company Arnold Merbl & Co. being also known outside the city. He also contributed to the construction of the Piarist complex between 1904 and 1908.

During the communist period, the ground floor of the building housed the Mihai Eminescu Bookstore, the largest bookstore in the city.

== Architecture ==
The Merbl Palace is compositionally dominated by a corner tower situated at the intersection of Victory Square and Dr. Nicolae Paulescu Street, continuing a two-story bay window and crowned with a decorative sheet-metal finish. The building distinguishes itself from its neighboring structures through the restrained treatment of its façades, entirely devoid of anthropomorphic or zoomorphic ornamentation. Decorative elements are limited to vegetal friezes within the bay windows and linear arrangements of blue ceramic tiles.

The departure from the façade plane, characteristic of Secession architecture in Timișoara, is also evident on the square-facing façade, where a second two-story bay window is present. This element is topped by a sheet-metal roof framed within a curvilinear pediment.

Over time, the palace lost its original wooden display cases that once lined the commercial ground floor, along with a series of finely crafted metalwork details, such as the floral hooks at gutter level.
