= Széchényi Palace =

- Palatul Széchényi
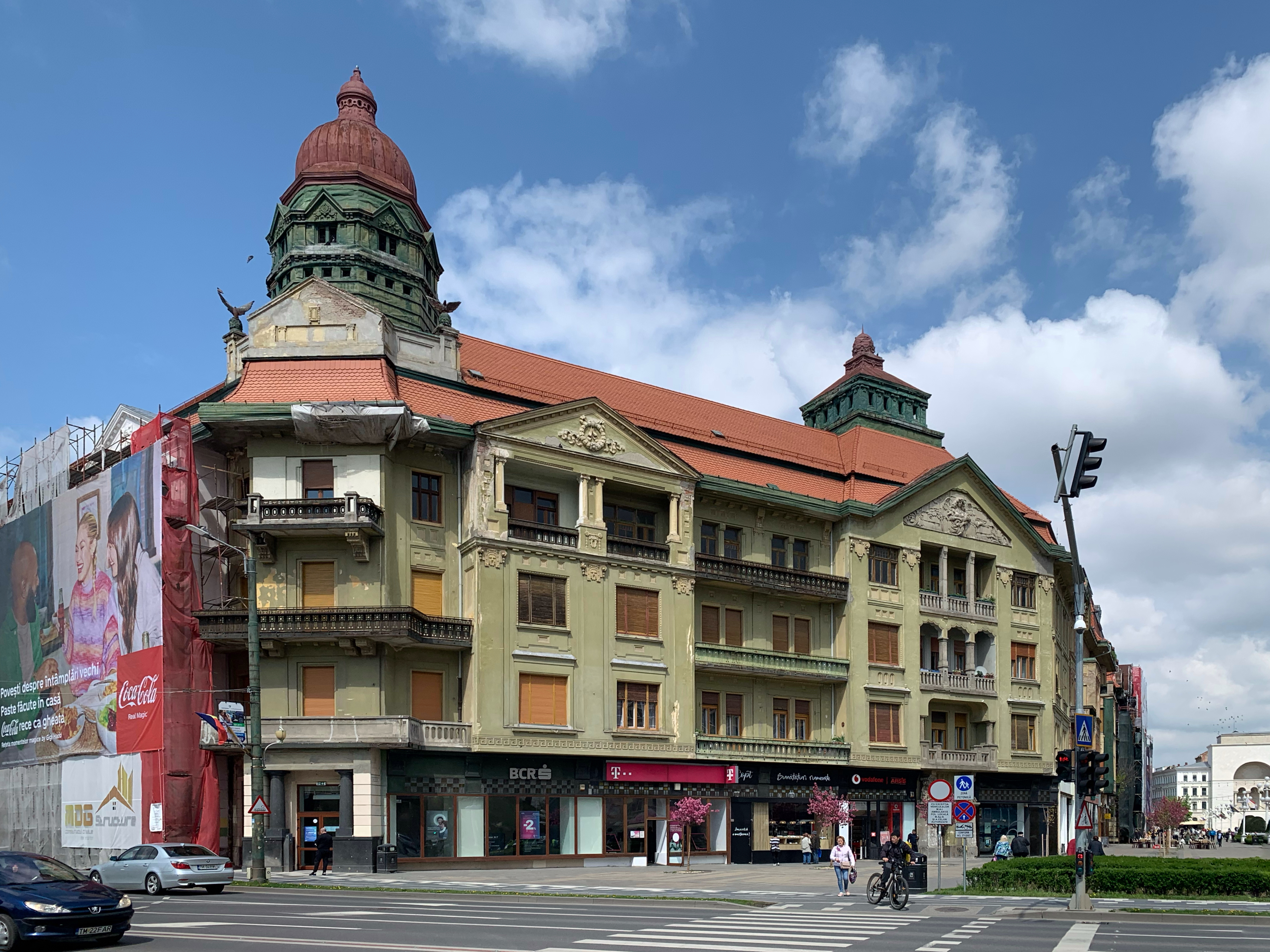
- Széchényi Palace in 2023
- Interactive map of the Széchényi Palace area

General information
- Architectural style: Secession
- Location: Victory Square, Timișoara
- Coordinates: 45°45′6″N 21°13′26″E
- Construction started: 1911
- Completed: 1913
- Client: Széchényi Rt

Design and construction
- Architect: László Székely

The Széchényi Palace (Romanian: Palatul Széchényi) is a historical building in the center of Timișoara, Romania in Victory Square. It is the last building on the Corso, at the end towards the cathedral.

== History ==
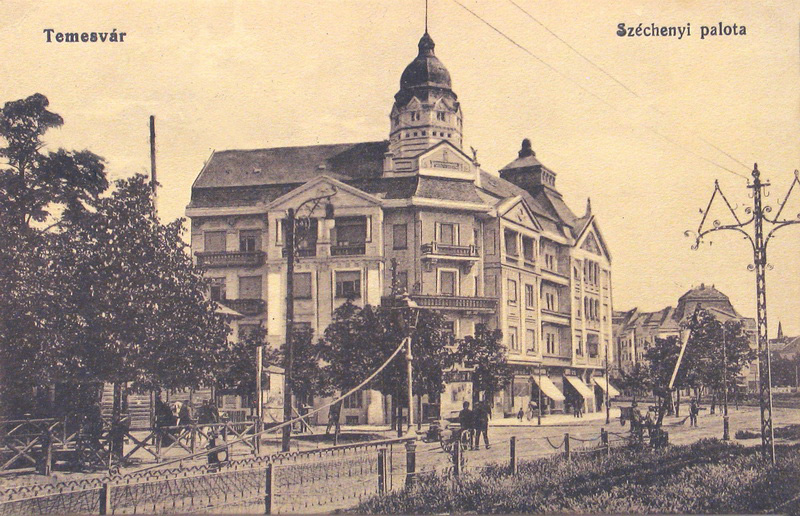
Széchényi Palace around 1900

Széchényi Rt had the palace built between 1911 and 1913 according to the plans of the architect László Székely. The building was intended for renting apartments on the upper floors, while the ground floor was reserved for shops. Székely's architectural office was located in this building. The architect Michael Wolf completed his professional practice in this office, who then took over the office from Székely. In the interwar period, Wolf was one of the most prominent architects of Timișoara.

From the beginning, the building had the central space on the ground floor intended as an eating place. If before the wars, until nationalization, an elegant bistro functioned there, after nationalization it turned into the self-service restaurant Expres. During the Revolution of December 1989, the scenes in front of the cathedral were filmed from a window of the building. Today, the ground floor houses numerous shops, as well as the Helios art gallery.

== Architecture ==
The four-story building is made in the 1900s style, presenting elements specific to the Secession movement. On the upper floors, there are portions that stick out, but being connected to each other by balconies, the corners are smoothed. These areas on the upper side end in triangular pediments with bas-relief. The corner of the building is provided with a tower.

Notable are the female figures on the ground floor, probably inspired by the so-called caryatids, which often framed the entrance portals in Vienna in Baroque (18th century), classicist (first half of the 19th century) and then historicist architecture (second half of the 19th century). These representations stand in contradiction with the evolved Secession of the period in which the Széchényi Palace appeared.
