= Victory Square, Timișoara =

Square in Timișoara, Romania

Victory Square
- City square
- {{{other_names}}}
- Piața Victoriei
- Former name: Opera Square
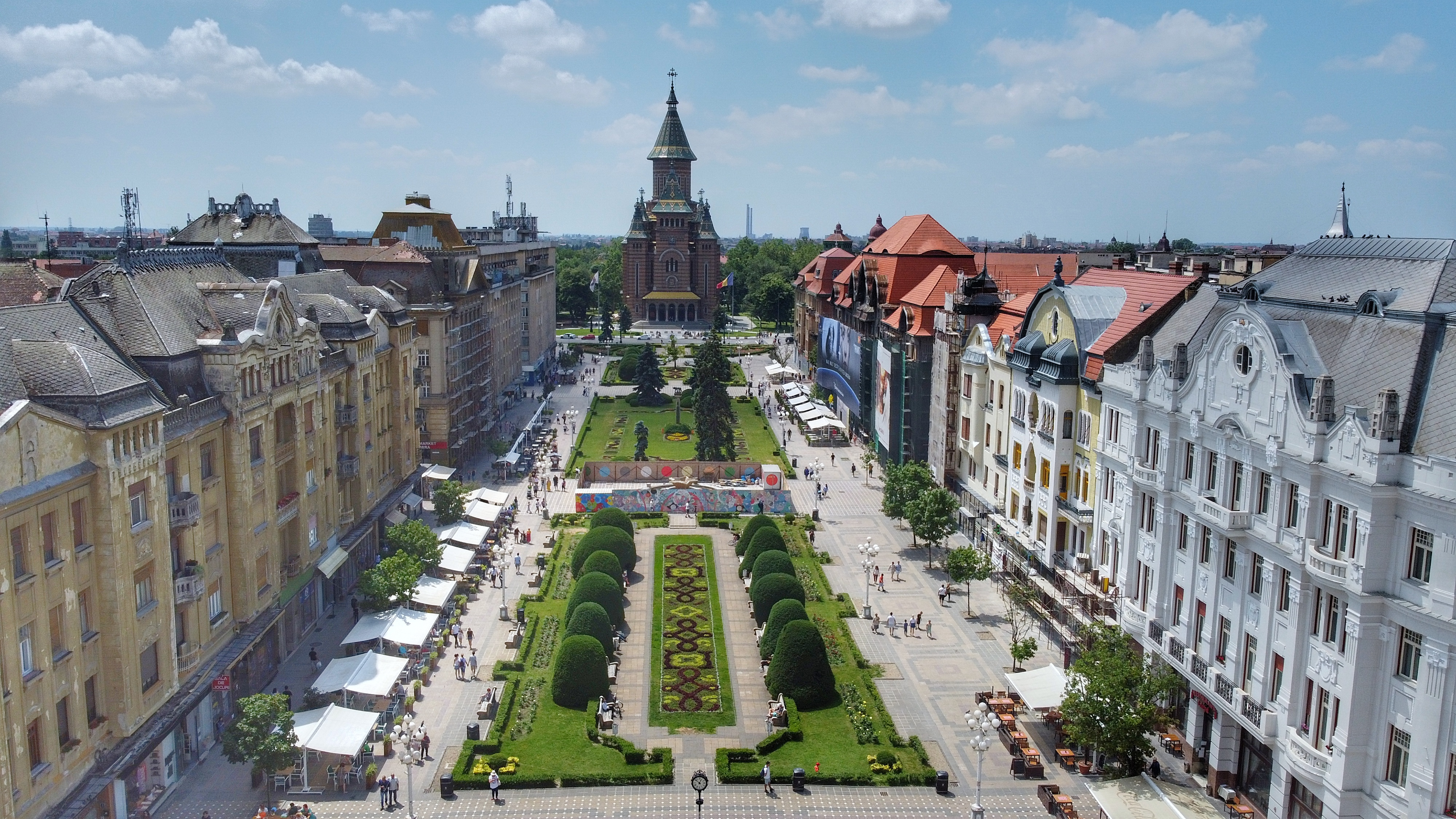
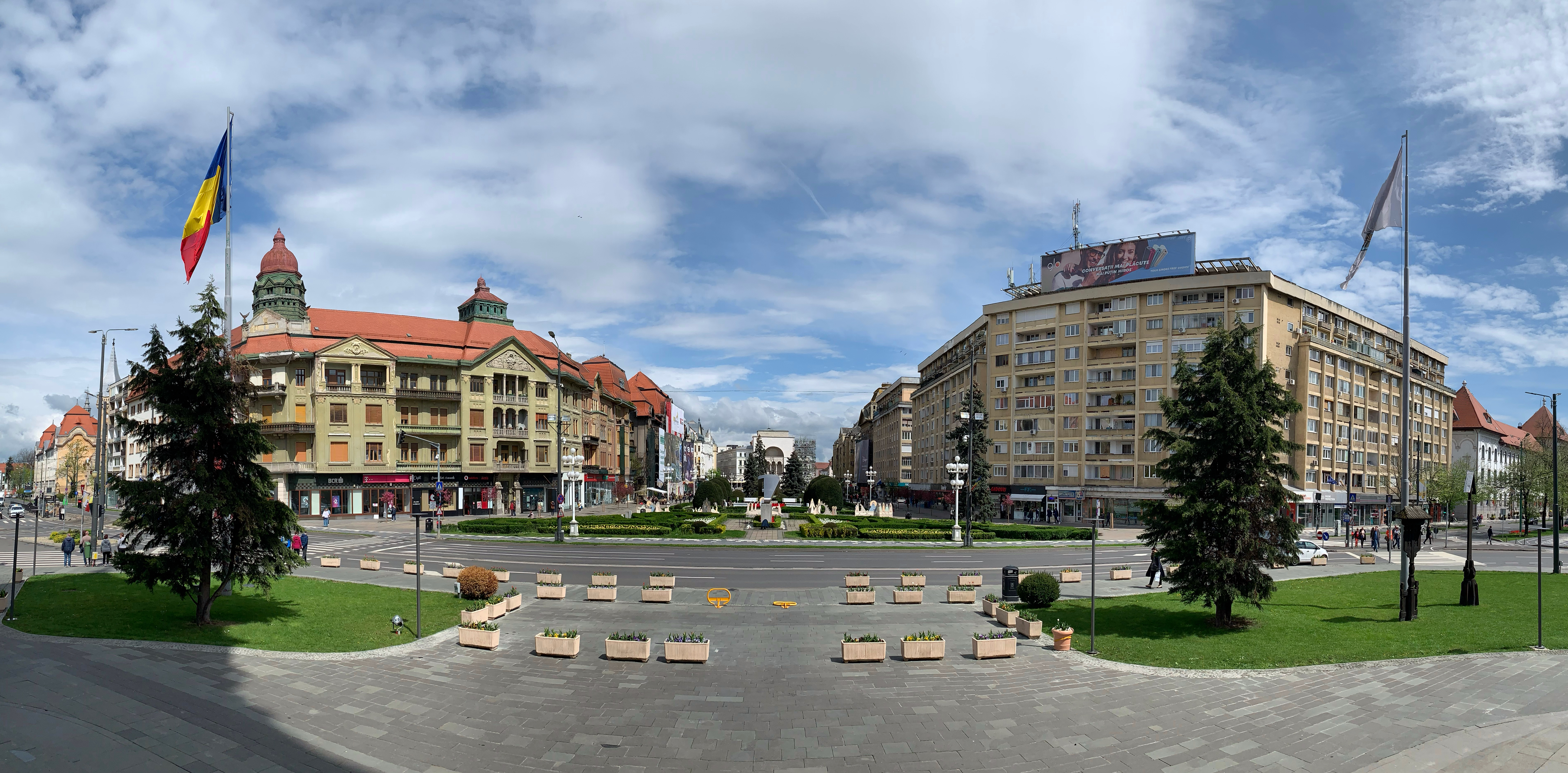
- The square as seen from the National Opera The square as seen from the Metropolitan Orthodox Cathedral
- Design: Ludwig von Ybl
- Constructed: 1910
- Length: 48.19 m
- Dedicated to: Victory of the Romanian Revolution
- Location: Cetate, Timișoara
- Interactive map of Victory Square
- Coordinates: 45°45′8.88″N 21°13′30.47″E

The Victory Square (Romanian: Piața Victoriei), (Note: Hungarian: Győzelem tér; German: Siegesplatz; Serbian: Трг победе, romanized: Trg pobede) known until 1990 as the Opera Square (Romanian: Piața Operei), is the central square of Timișoara. It is the place where Timișoara was proclaimed on 20 December 1989 the first city free of communism in Romania. It was a main boulevard, transformed into a square after the closure of the southern side by the construction of the Metropolitan Cathedral. The opposite poles of the square consist of the Opera to the north and the Metropolitan Cathedral to the south. From the Opera to the Cathedral the promenade on the right is called Corso, and the one on the left is called Surogat. Both have protected architectural ensembles of local historical importance.

The square hosts the buildings of some important institutions such as the National Theater and Opera, the Orthodox Cathedral, Timiș, Capitol and Studio cinemas, the Museum of Banat, several art galleries as well as many shops and sidewalk cafés. Some of the most important cultural events take place in Victory Square: JazzTM, Timfloralis, FEST-FDR, Opera and Operetta Festival, Easter and Christmas fairs, New Year's concerts, etc.

== History ==
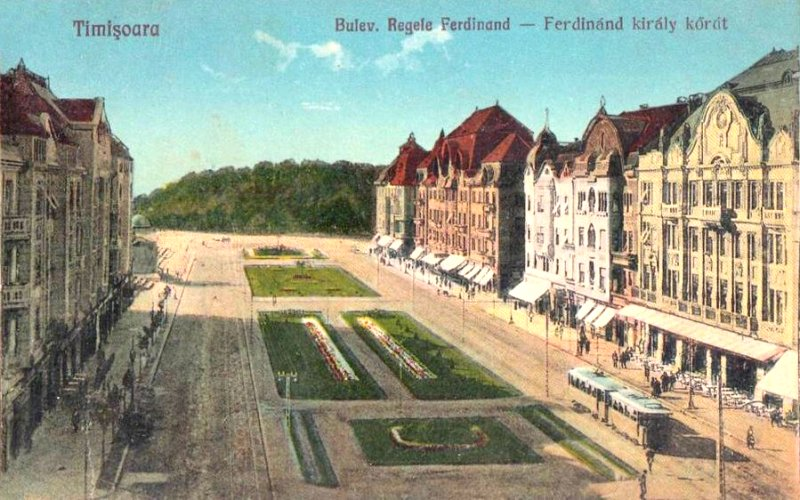
King Ferdinand Boulevard in 1926

Victory Square was designed at the beginning of the 20th century when the walls of the old fortress were being demolished, and the center of Timișoara was redesigned to allow the development of the city.

In 1870, in the hope that a decision of defortification would be obtained, a small circular square had been designed approximately on the land of today's square. Only after Franz Joseph I's decision to cancel Timișoara's status of fortress on 23 April 1892, architect Ludwig von Ybl drawn up a "general city development plan", which provided for the establishment of a wide boulevard, having approximately the size of the current square. Subsequent projects did not essentially change the size of the square, but only the details. Until 1948, it was called King Ferdinand Boulevard, after which it was renamed 30 December Boulevard. The demolition of the fortifications began in 1899. On 29 August 1910, permission was issued to build the first building flanking the current square, Lloyd Palace. The other buildings on the western side of the square were built at a rapid pace until 1913. Before World War I, only the imposing Löffler Palace was built on the eastern side.

The boulevard aspect diminished in favor of the square aspect when the southern side was closed by the construction of the Cathedral. Road and tram traffic continued through the square after this time. Only in 1988–1989, with the removal of tram rails, the square became completely pedestrianized. The former ring road, which surrounded the Cetate district and which passed in front of the Opera, was also closed.

== Corso ==
Corso is the name of the promenade that starts from the Opera to the Cathedral, on the right. In the past, it was the walking place of the high society of Timișoara, well illuminated, with luxury restaurants and shops.

Opposite the Opera, on the right, is the old building of the Timișoara Hotel. Next to it, at the beginning of Republic Boulevard, is Weiss Palace. From here begins the promenade itself, with the Lloyd Palace which houses the rectorate of the Polytechnic University and, on the ground floor, the famous Lloyd restaurant. In order follow Neuhausz Palace, Merbl Palace, Dauerbach Palace, Hilt–Vogel Palace and finally Széchenyi Palace.

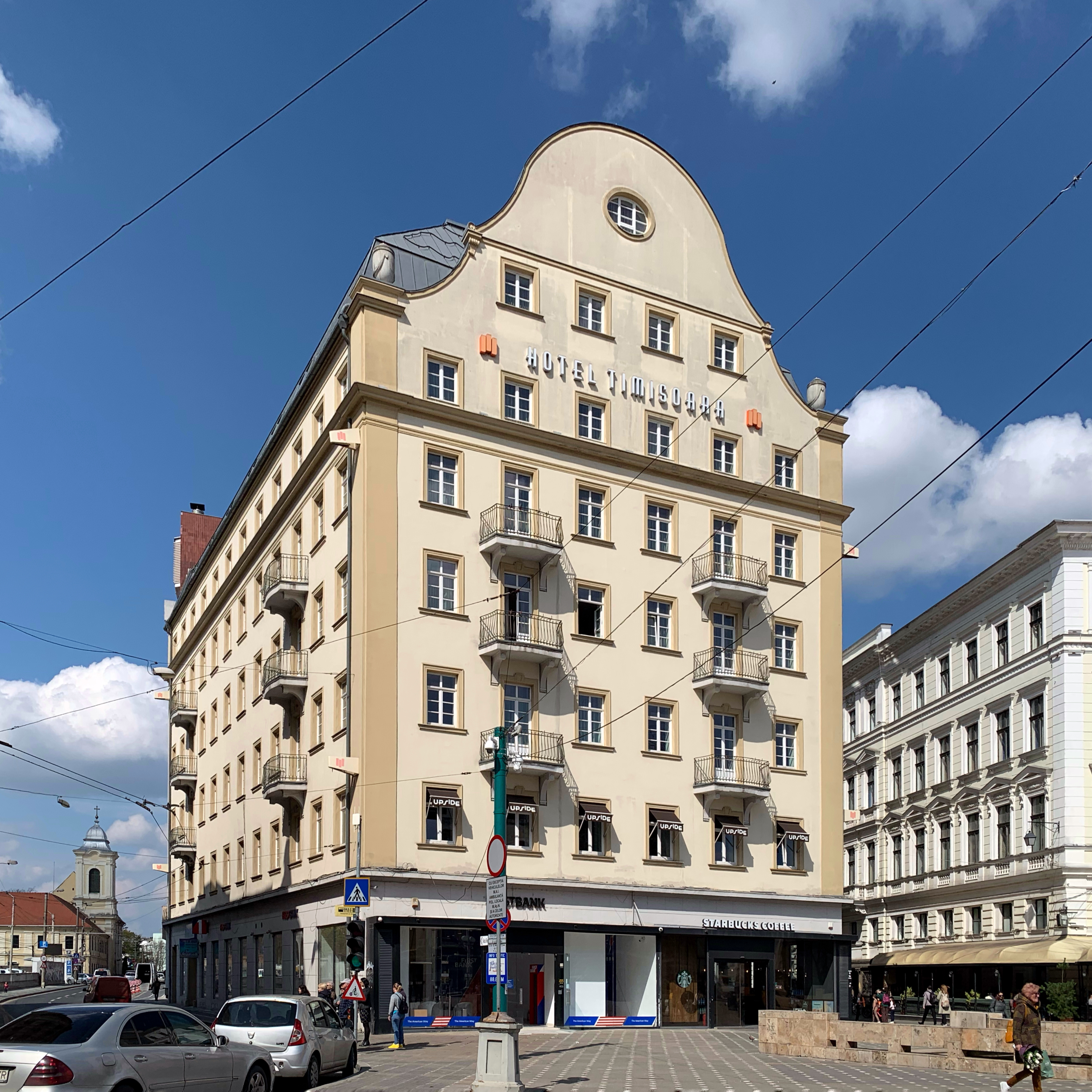
The old building of the Timișoara Hotel

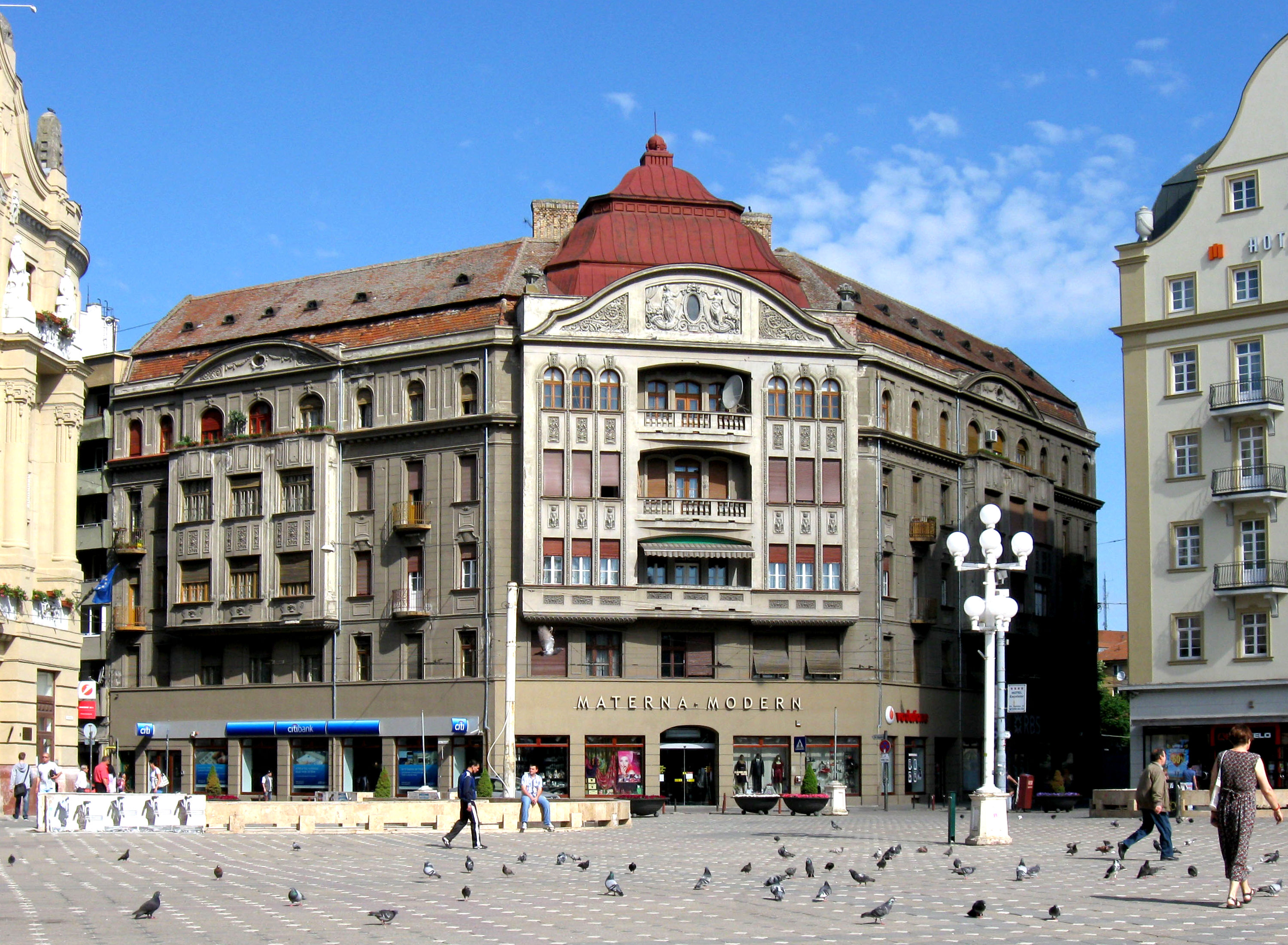
Weiss Palace

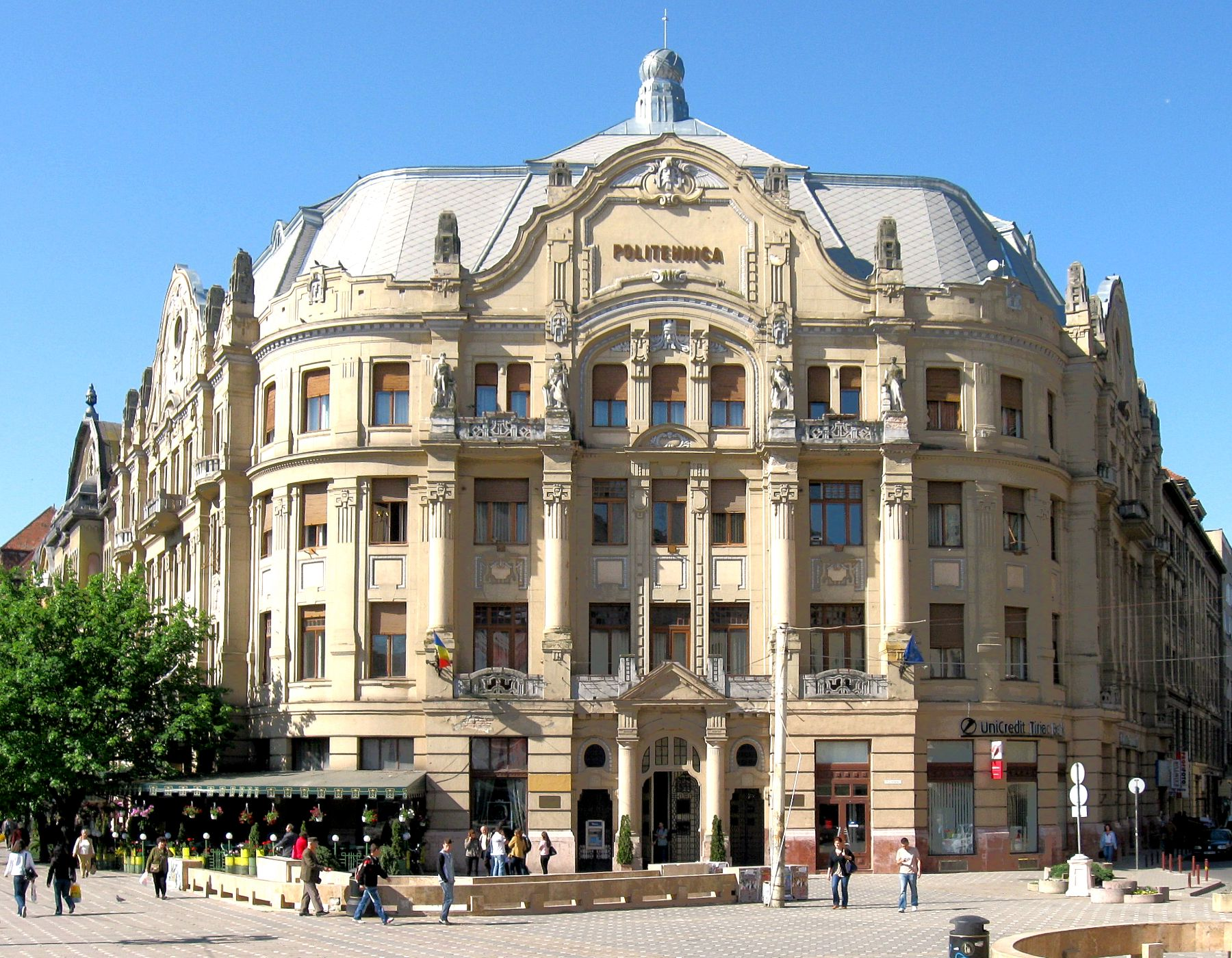
Lloyd Palace with Lloyd restaurant on the ground floor

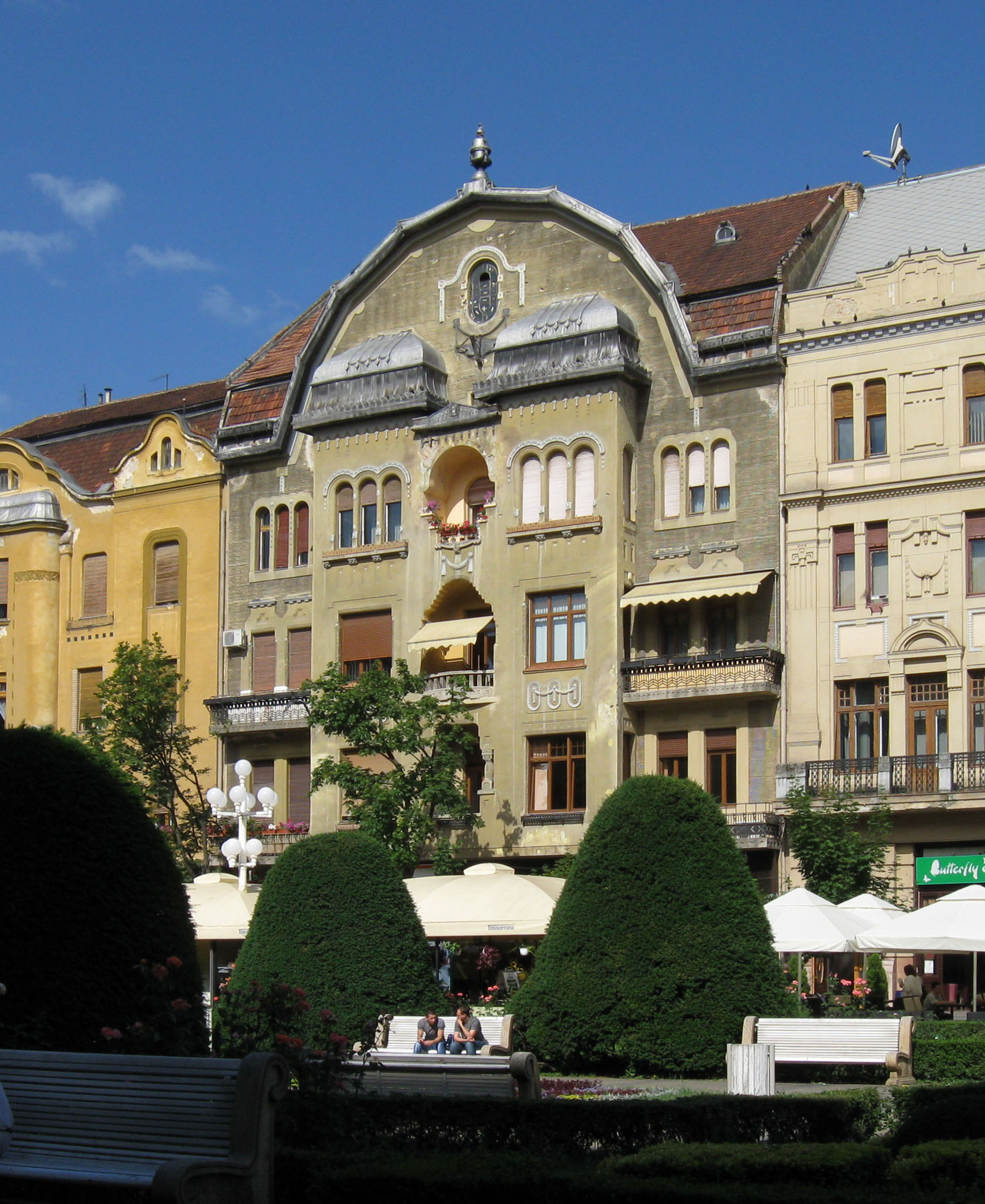
Neuhaus Palace

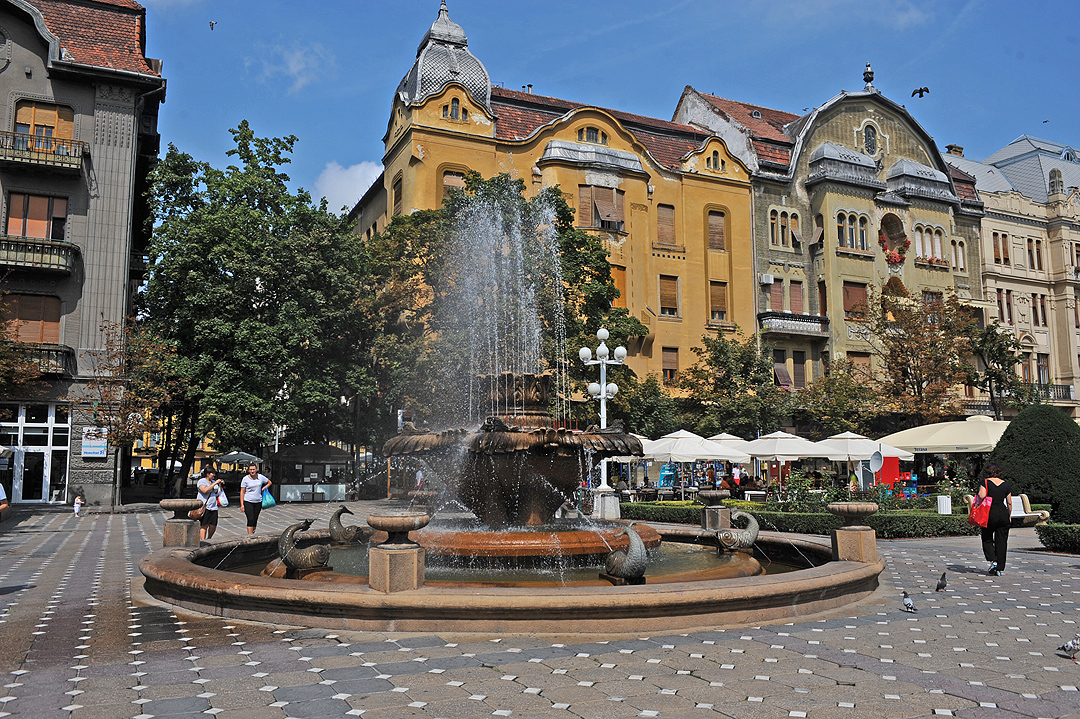
Merbl Palace and the "fountain with fish"

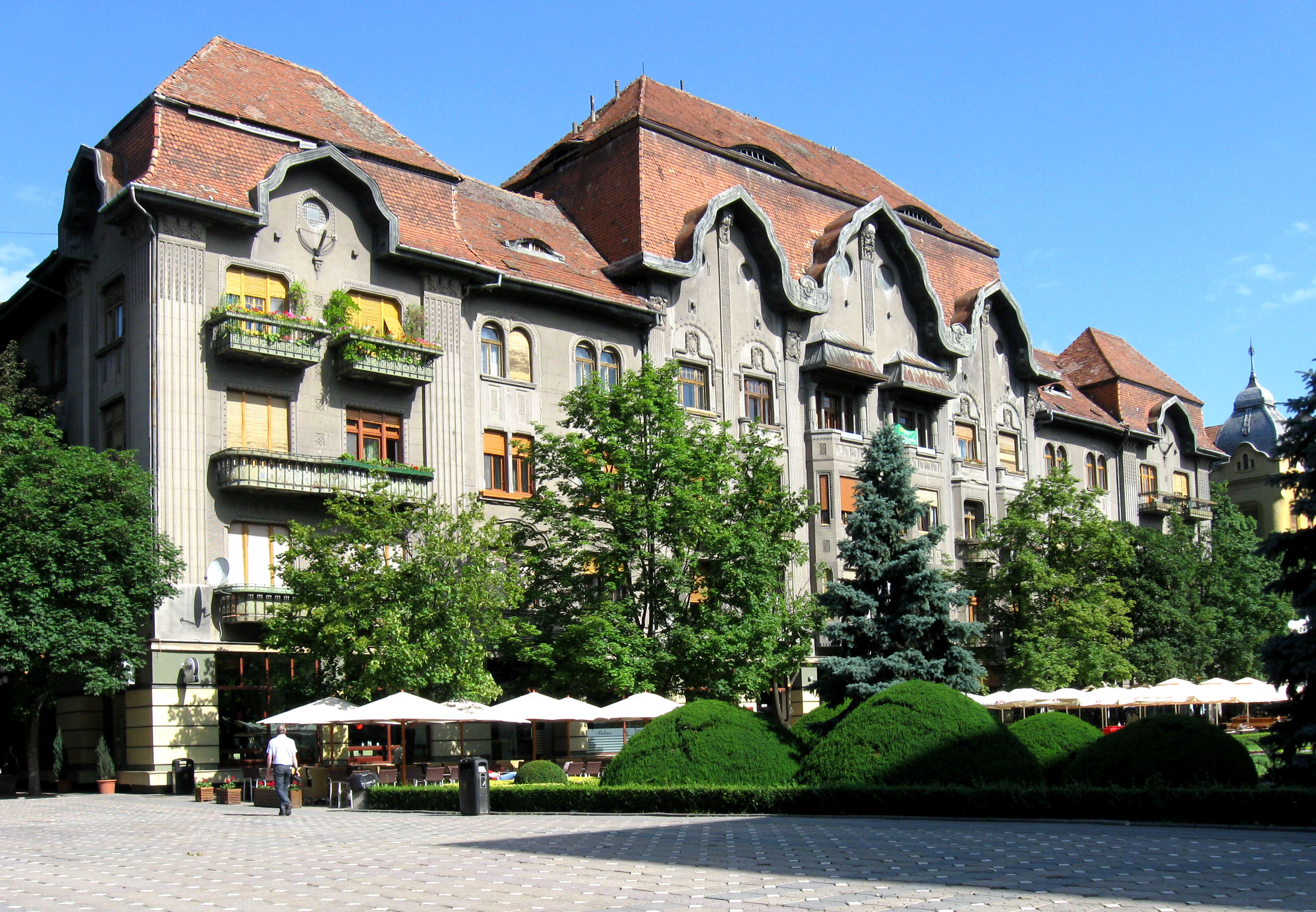
Dauerbach Palace

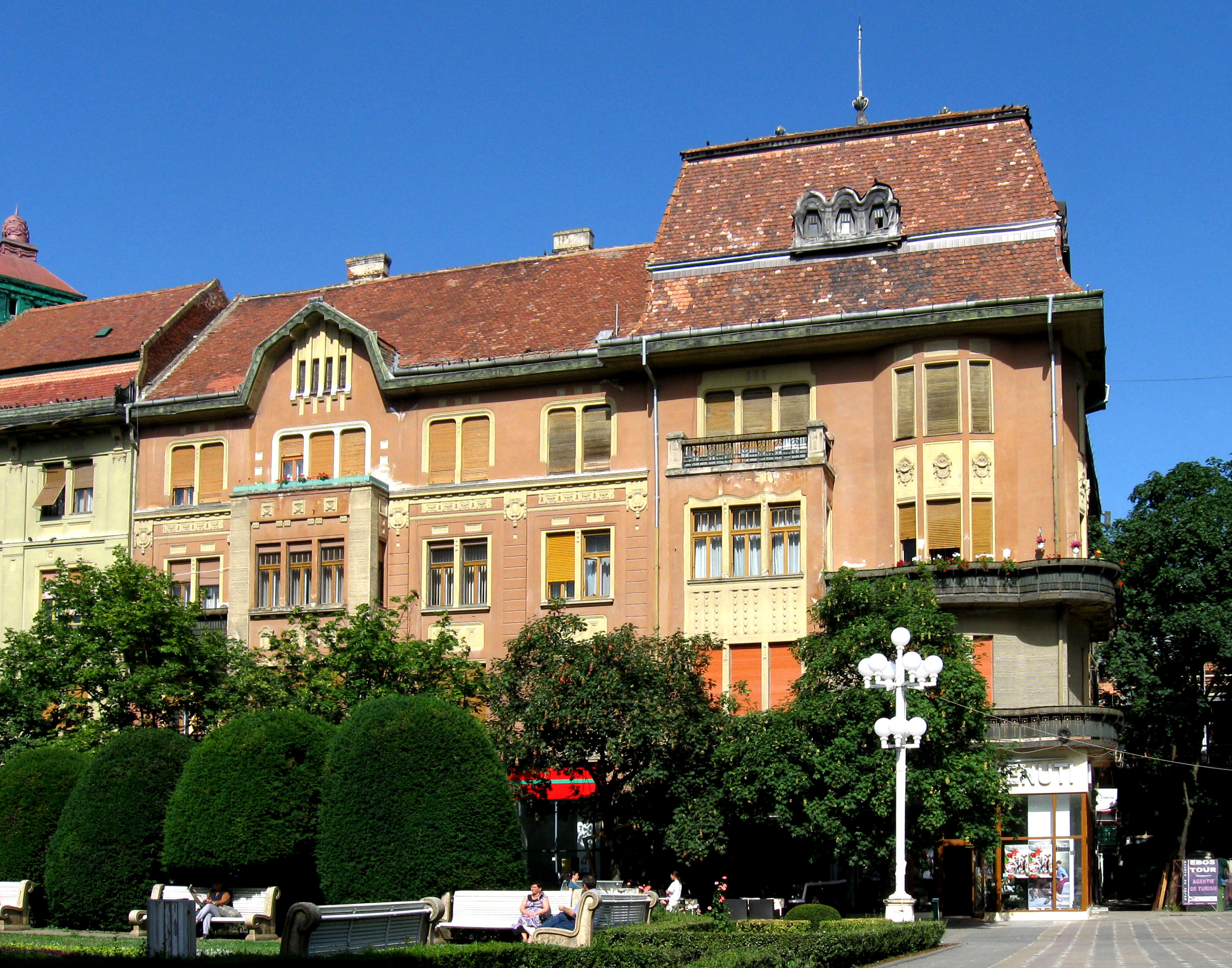
Hilt-Vogel Palace

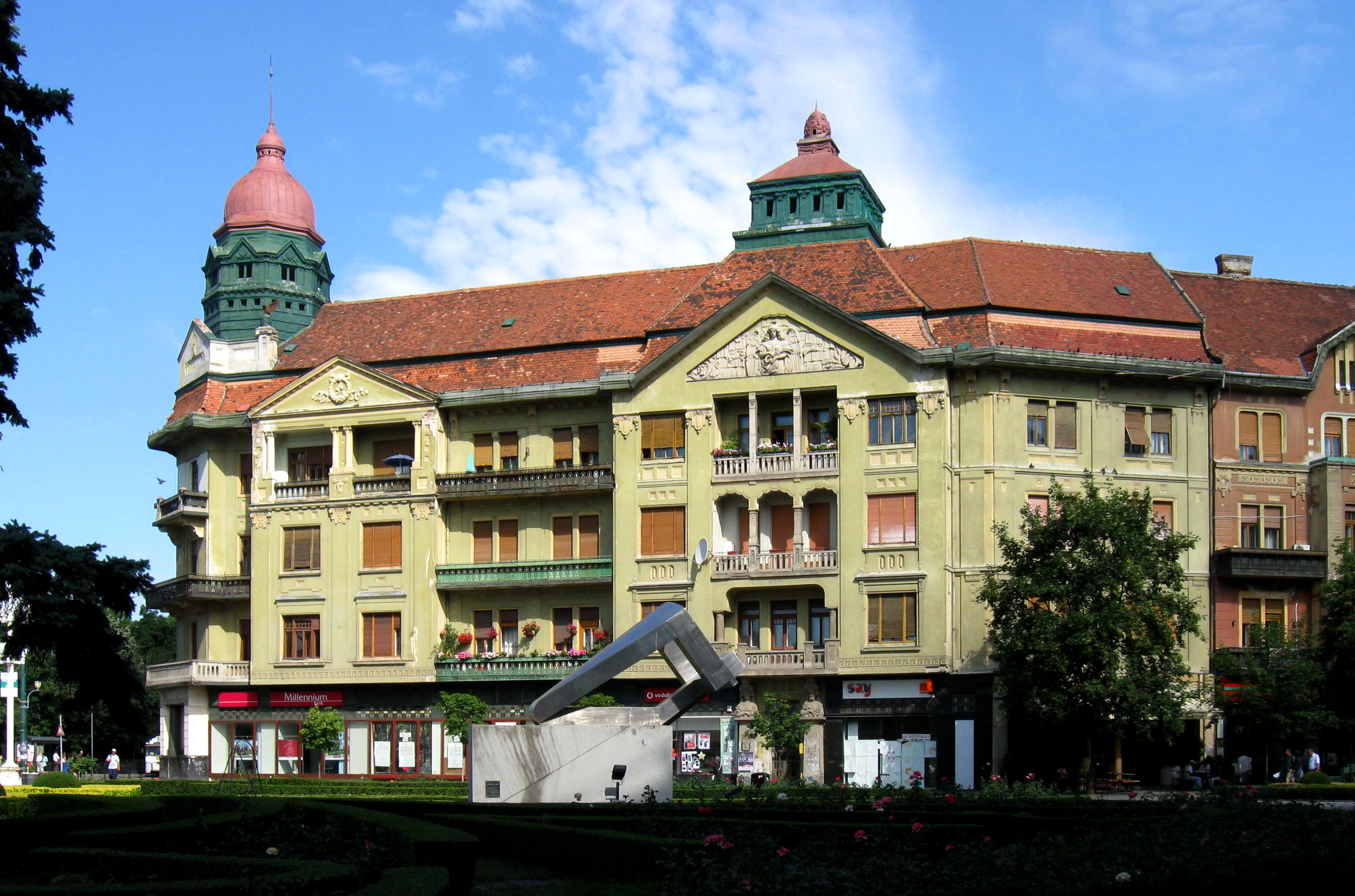
Széchényi Palace

== Surogat ==
Surogat is the opposite promenade, on the left side, and a direct continuation of Alba Iulia Street. In the past, only young people and workers walked here. The students only had access with the permission of the school, and the soldiers had to prove that they were on leave in order to walk here.

The first building is the Löffler Palace, followed by the Palace of the Chamber of Commerce, next to which was built in 1938 the Scala cinema, later renamed Studio. At the end of the promenade are a series of apartment buildings built between 1961–1963. From one end to the other, there are numerous shops on the ground floor.

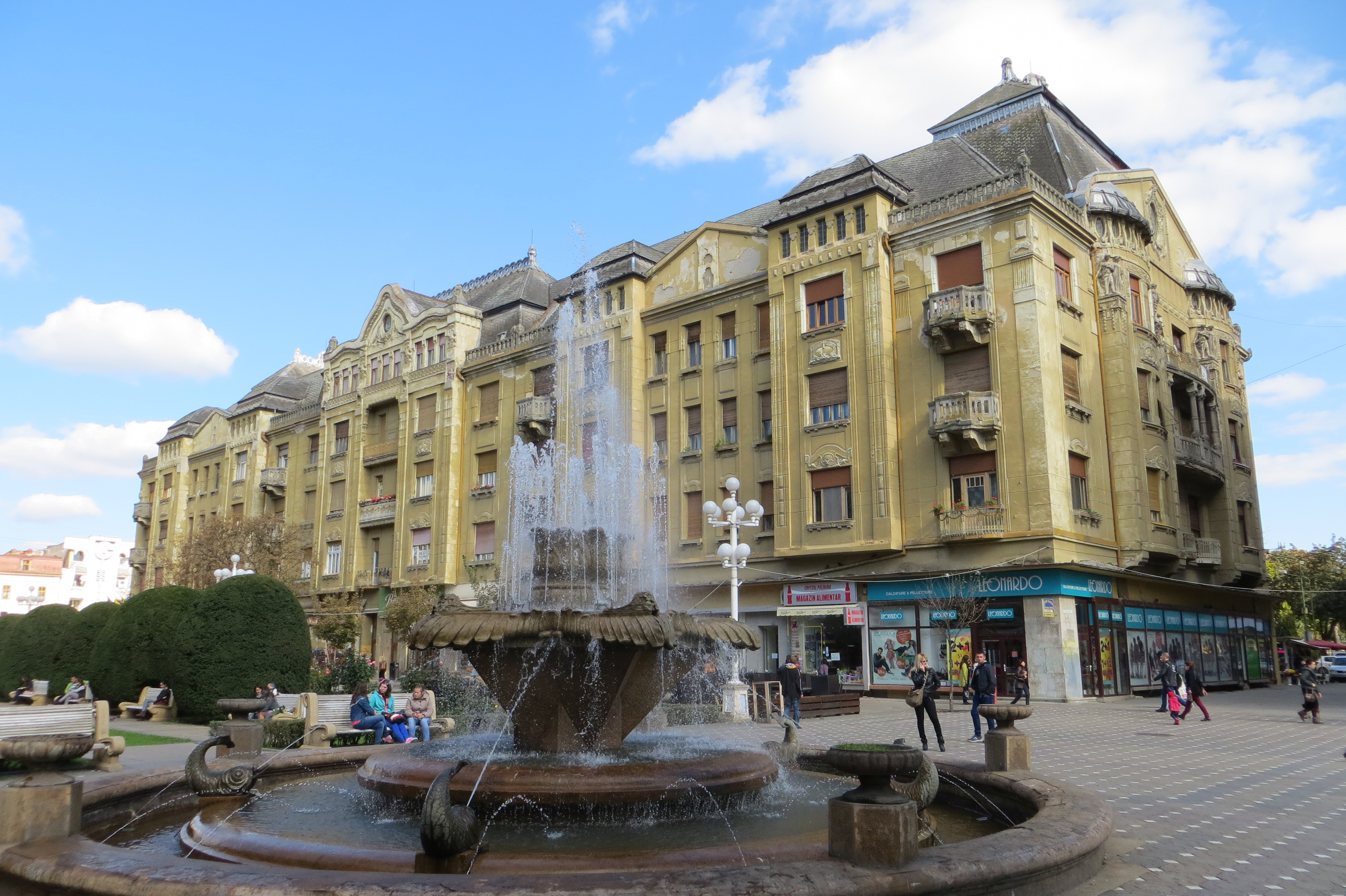
Löffler Palace

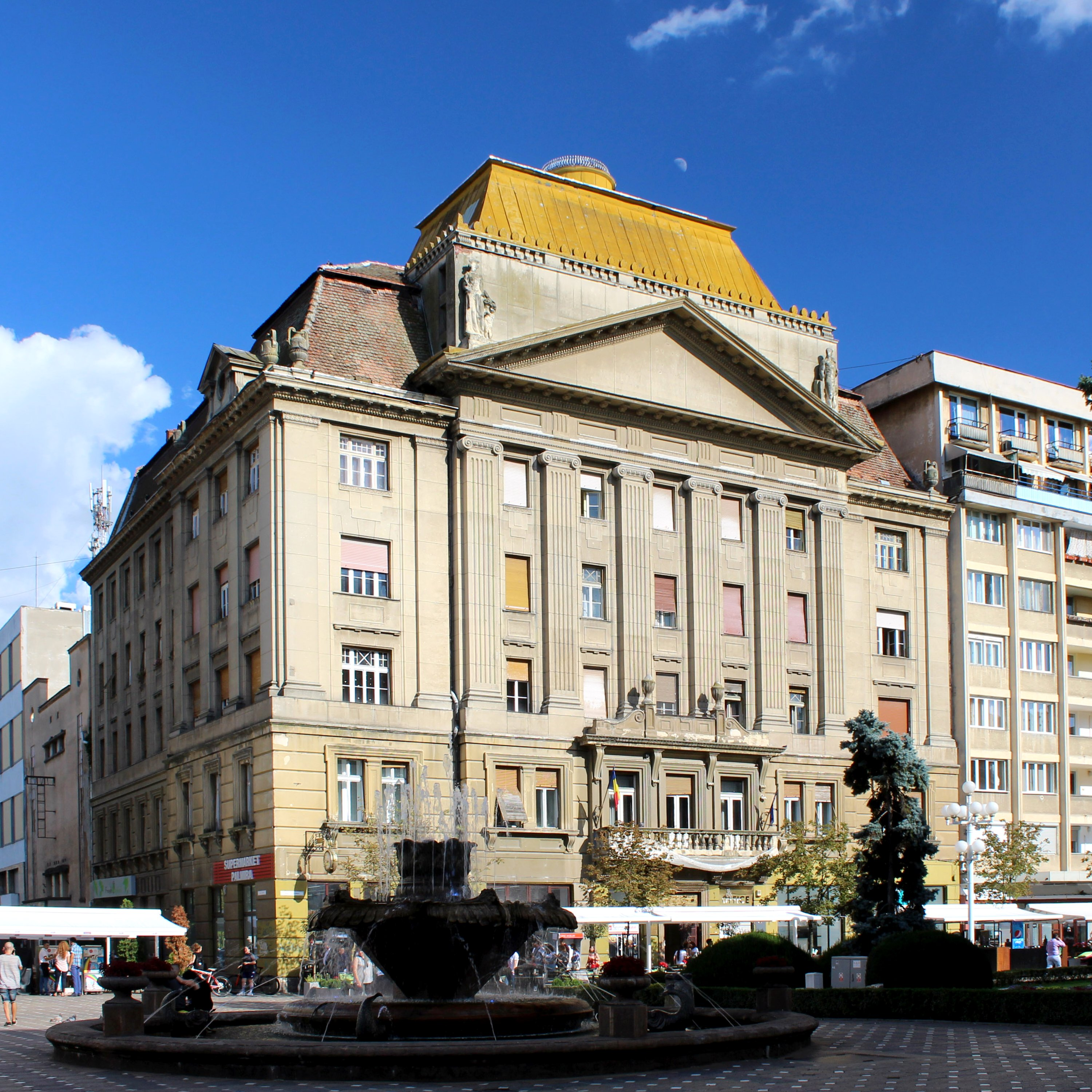
Palace of the Chamber of Commerce

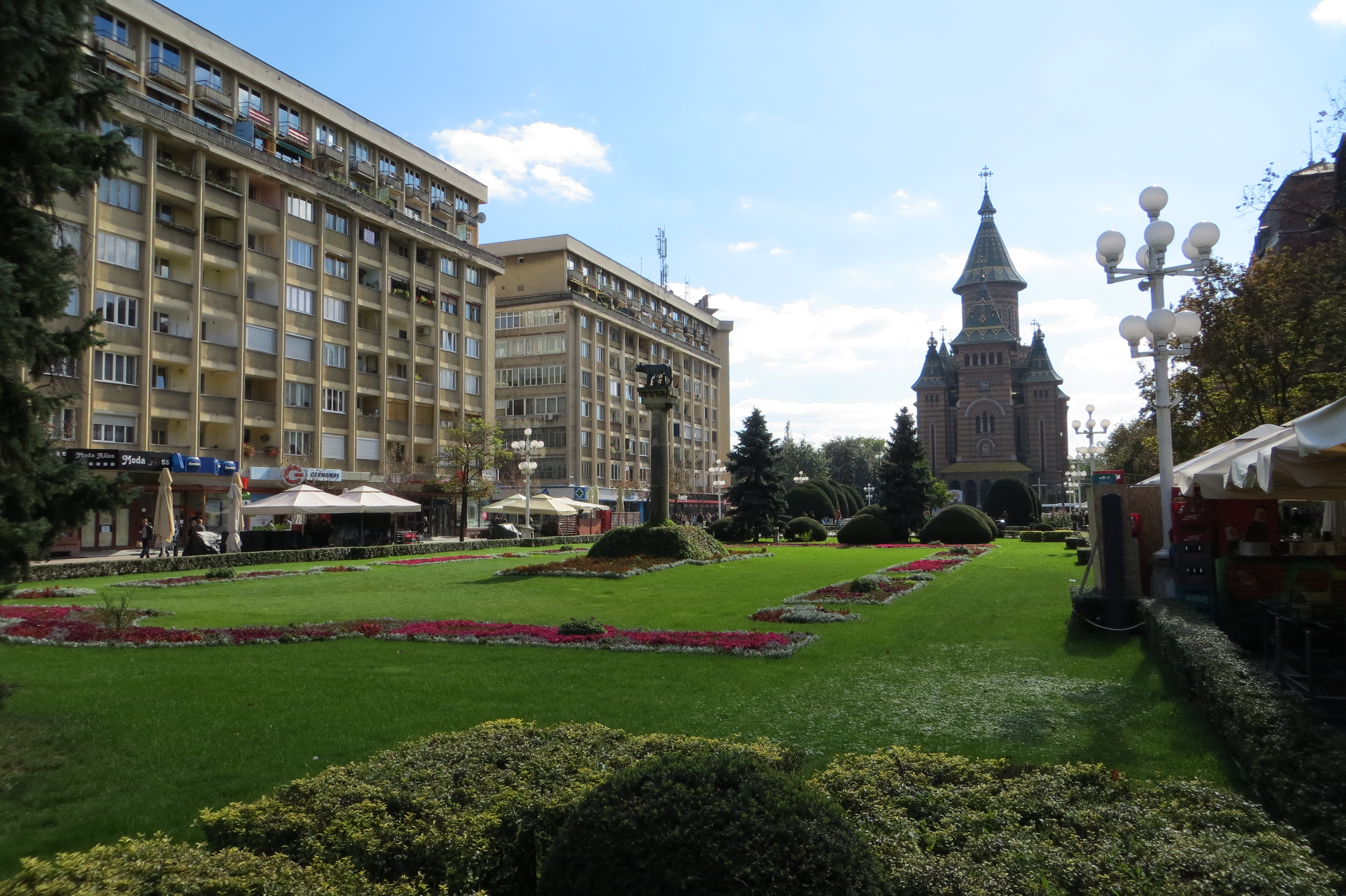
Modernist blocks on Surogat

== Monuments ==
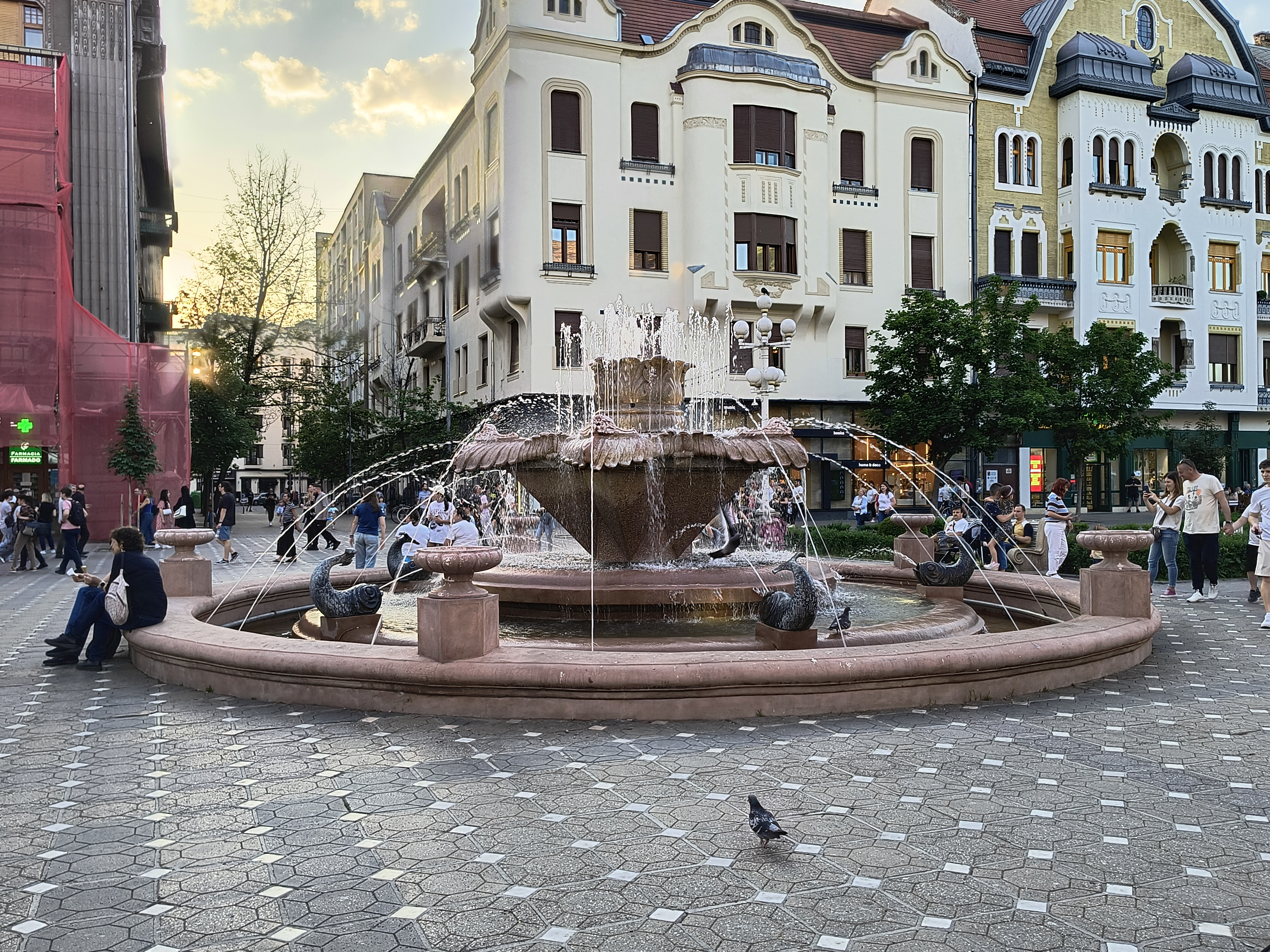
The fish fountain

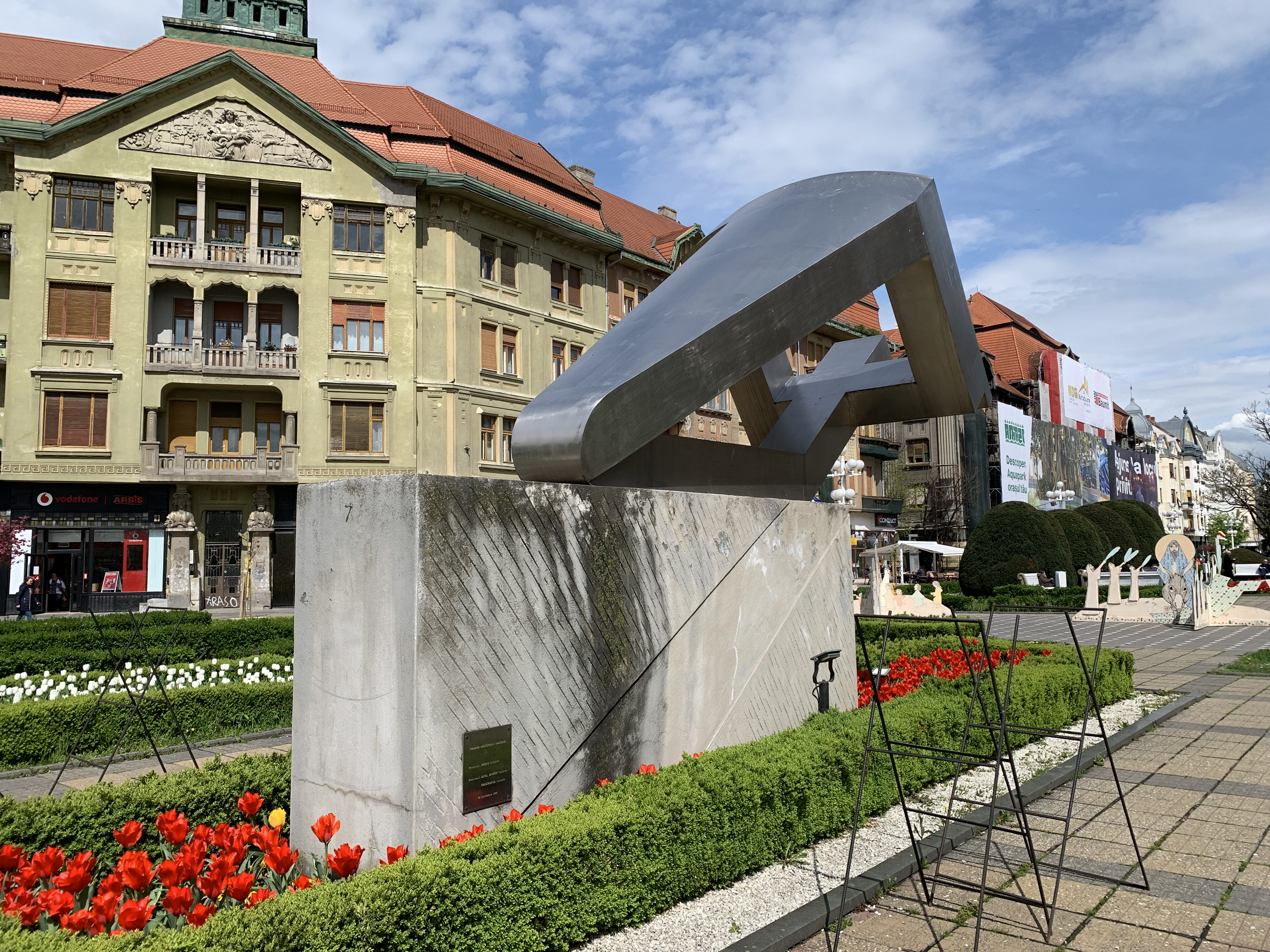
Crucificare by Paul Neagu

The "she-wolf with cubs", supported by a five-meter-high pillar, is a replica of the Capitoline Wolf, given to Timișoara in 1926 by Rome. The statue was brought down during World War II, after Romania turned against the Axis. Romanians in Timișoara decided to protest against Fascist Italy led by Benito Mussolini, who supported Hungary to obtain Northern Transylvania. The local authorities later put the statue back in its place during a visit by Nicolae Ceaușescu.

Between the Capitoline Wolf and the Opera there is the "fountain with fish", an artesian fountain built in 1957. Initially, its shape was a five-pointed star. Its name is due to the fish-shaped sculptures that decorate it.

At the end from the Cathedral, the Monument of the Crucifixion was erected in 1999. It is a stainless steel work by Romanian-English sculptor Paul Neagu dedicated to the victims of the 1989 Revolution.
