= Dauerbach Palace =

- Palatul Dauerbach
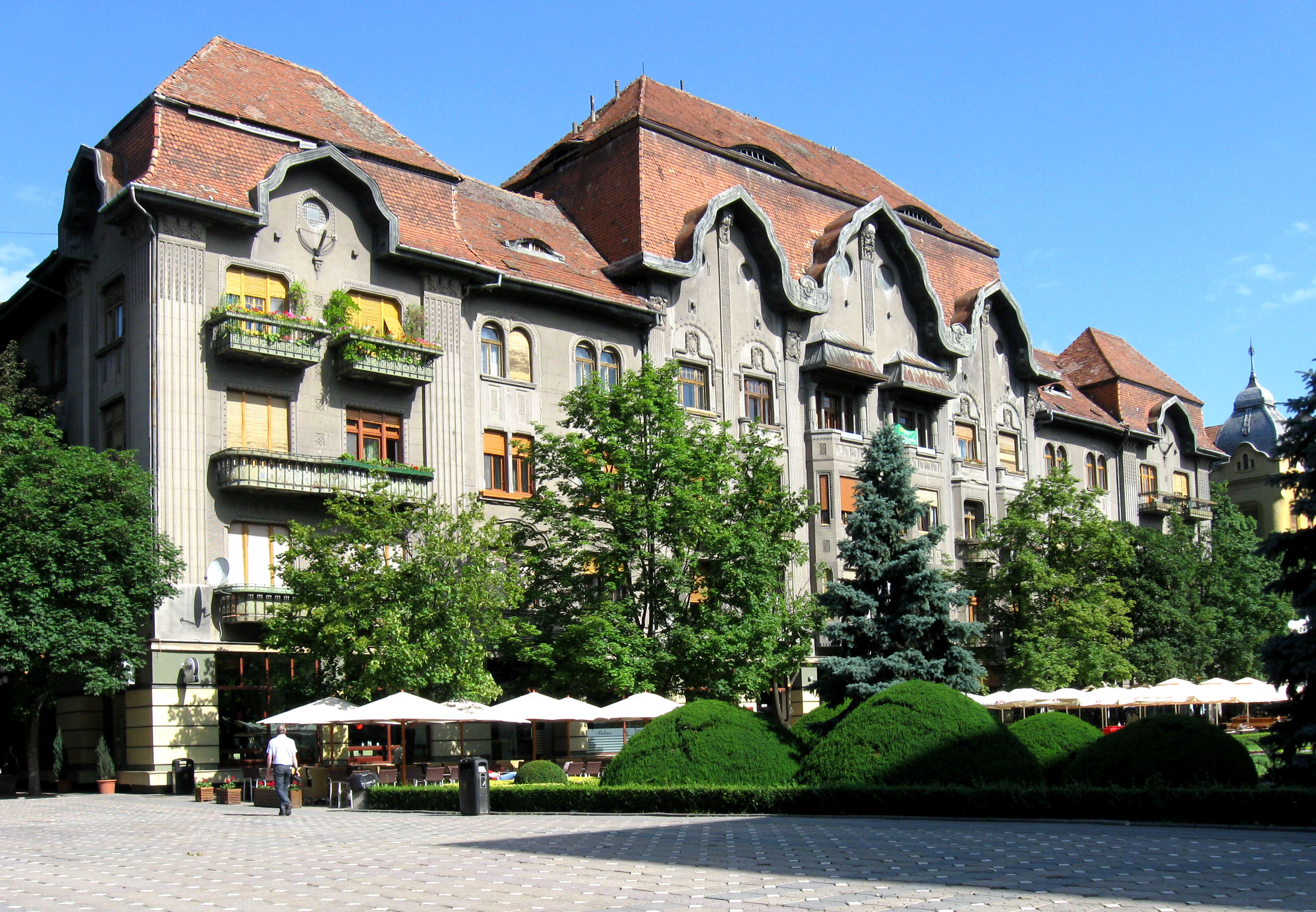
- Interactive map of the Dauerbach Palace area
- Alternative names: Palace

General information
- Architectural style: Art Nouveau
- Location: Victory Square, Timișoara
- Coordinates: 45°45′9″N 21°13′28″E
- Construction started: 1911
- Completed: 1913

Technical details
- Floor count: 5

Design and construction
- Architect: László Székely

The Dauerbach Palace (Romanian: Palatul Dauerbach), or simply Palace (from the restaurant of the same name housed on the ground floor), is a historic building in the center of Timișoara, Romania in Victory Square, built in 1913 in Art Nouveau style for Georg Dauerbach and designed by the architect László Székely. It is located in the part of the square known as Corso.

== History ==
The palace was built between 1911 and 1913, according to the plans of László Székely. The palace bears the name of the owner, Georg Dauerbach, who bought from the City Hall, in 1911, the land of about 1,240 m^{2}, at the price of 250,000 crowns, with the intention of building a house with apartments for rent.

There has been a café and a restaurant on the ground floor since the early years. The first tenant was Henric Berger, who agreed with the city council on the use of the outdoor space, the arrangement of the tables and chairs and the size of the sunshades. The Palace has long been one of the most beautiful and elegant restaurants in the city and was particularly popular with the city's youth in the first half of the 20th century for its musical performances. A pharmacy has operated on the northern corner of the building since 1913. After World War II, the restaurant was closed and used as a storage room. The Palace restaurant reopened in the late 1960s. A gambling hall was also operated here, but the establishment was closed again in the following years.

== Architecture ==
The Dauerbach Palace was built in the Art Nouveau style, and its dark, sober facade is divided into a central part and two lateral parts. The imposing building stands out for its massive and undulating roof volumes. The central part is, in turn, divided into three taller parts, with three pediments in the shape of an ogival brace at the roof level. The sides have two pilasters each, and on the upper level they have a pediment and a shorter roof.
