= Weiss Palace =

- Palatul Weiss
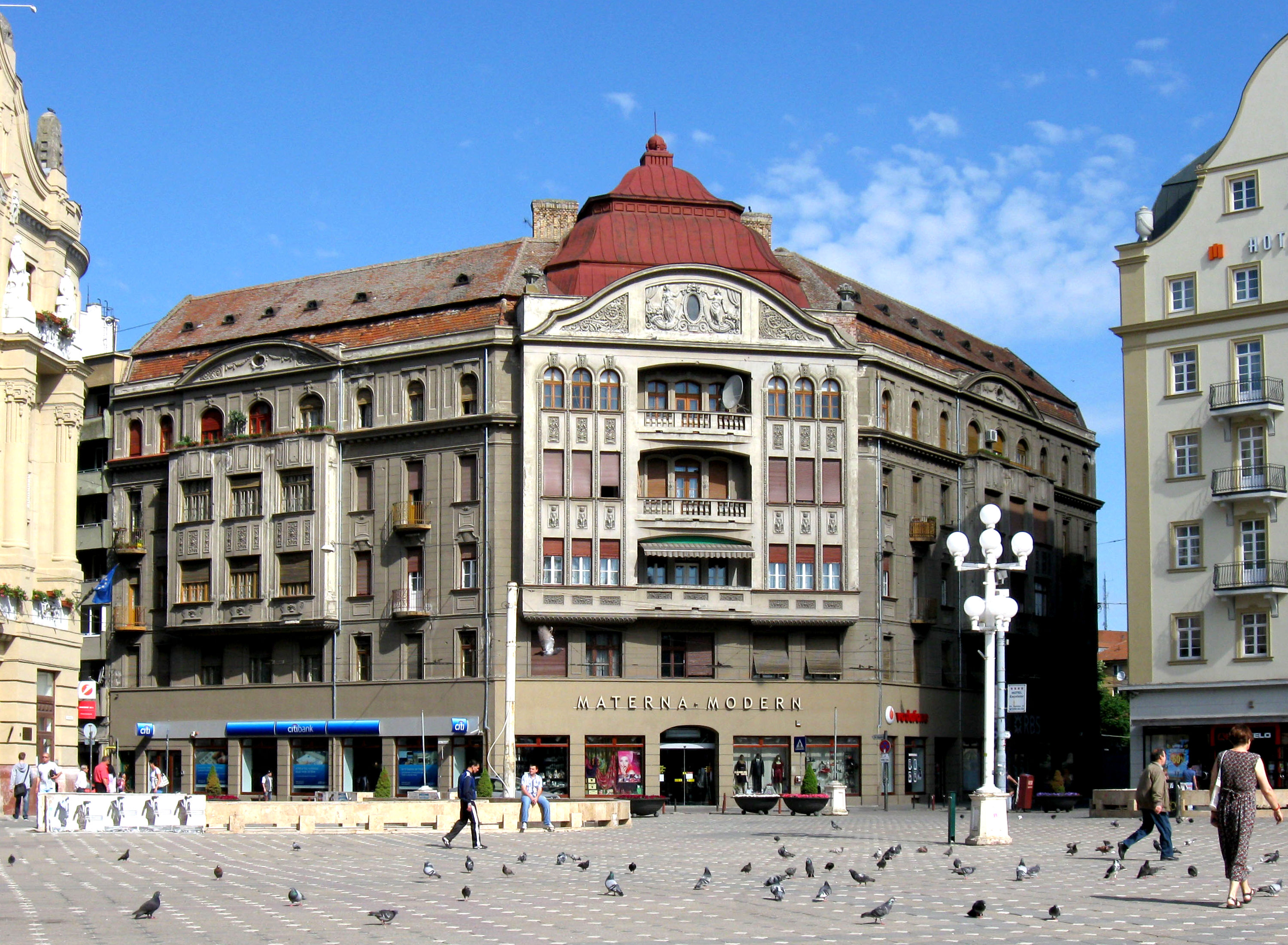
- Interactive map of the Weiss Palace area

General information
- Architectural style: Eclectic
- Location: Timișoara, Romania
- Coordinates: 45°45′14″N 21°13′29″E
- Completed: 1912

Design and construction
- Architects: Adalbert Szladek; László Székely
- Main contractor: Arnold Merbl Co.

The Weiss Palace (Romanian: Palatul Weiss) is a historic building in the center of Timișoara, Romania. It is located in Victory Square, right where the Republic Boulevard and one of the two promenades of the square begin.

== History ==
The Weiss Palace was built in 1912 by Arnold Merbl Co. according to the plans of Adalbert Szladek. The pediment was redesigned by László Székely, former chief architect of Timișoara.

As its name suggests, the palace belonged to the Weiss family. It played an important role in the life of the city, being made up of doctors, entrepreneurs, industrialists and other prominent representatives of various professions. The Weiss Palace was built for the purpose of renting out the apartments in it, and the business was a profitable one for this family.

The eclectic-style building has 27 apartments, some even with six rooms, and there are shops on the ground floor. A notable feature of the palace's architecture is that the entrance and the pediment are not aligned. The main entrance is located on St. John Street, whereas the pediment is situated on the side facing the National Theater.
