= Lloyd Palace =

- Palatul Lloyd
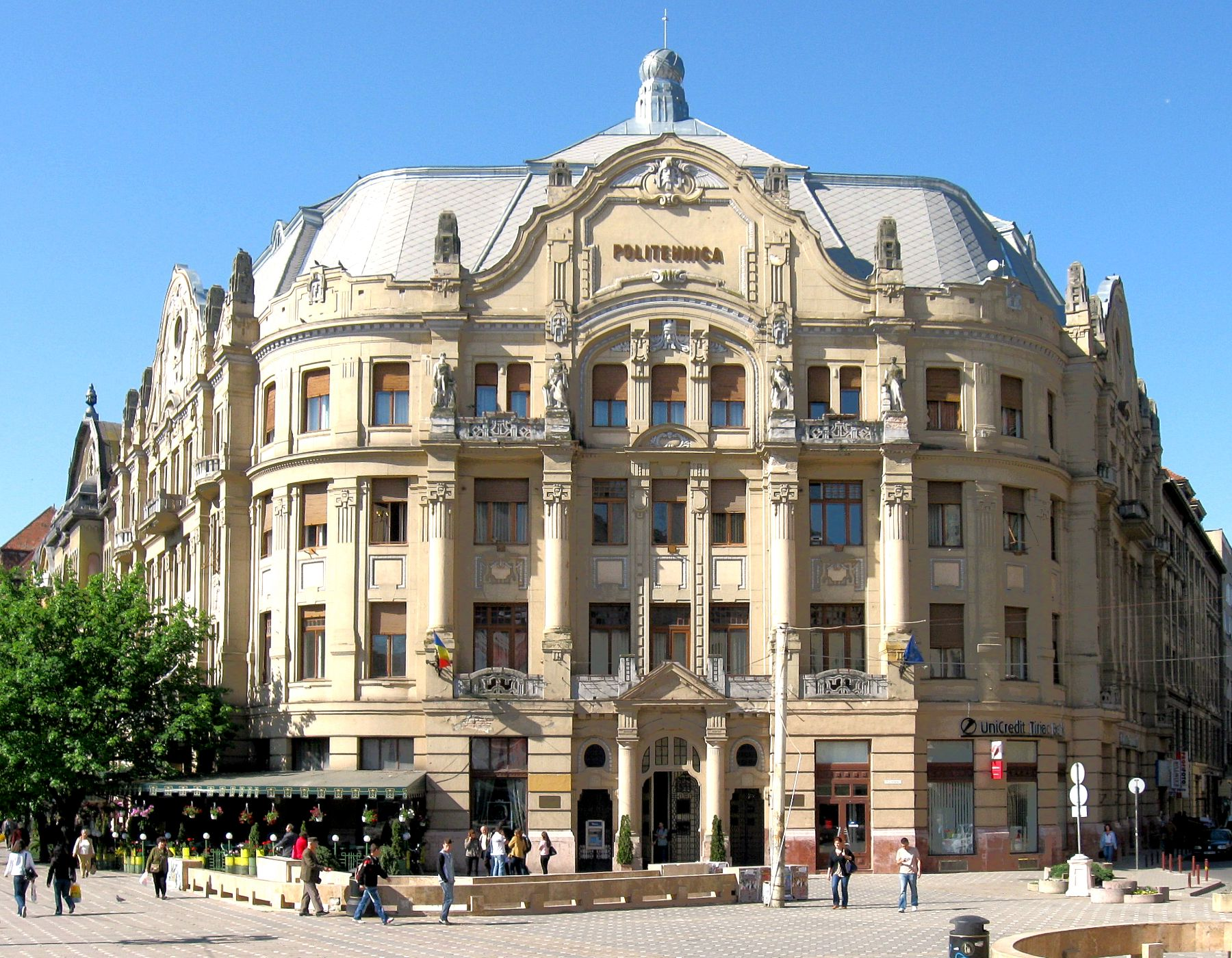
- The Lloyd Palace in 2009
- Interactive map of the Lloyd Palace area

General information
- Architectural style: Eclectic, Baroque, Secession
- Location: Victory Square, Timișoara
- Coordinates: 45°45′12″N 21°13′29″E
- Construction started: 1910
- Completed: 1912
- Owner: Politehnica University of Timișoara

Design and construction
- Architect: Lipót Baumhorn
- Main contractor: Arnold Merbl

The Lloyd Palace (Romanian: Palatul Lloyd) is a historic building in the Victory Square of Timișoara, Romania. Named after the historical Lloyd restaurant on its ground floor, it is now the seat of the Rectorate of the Politehnica University of Timișoara.

== History ==
The three-story monumental building is located on the Corso, i.e. the left part of the Victory Square. In the past, Corso (also known as Lloyd Alley) was the walking area of Timișoara's high society, a well-lit promenade with famous shops. The Lloyd Palace was built between 1910–1912 according to the plans of Lipót Baumhorn in an eclectic style with elements of the Baroque and Secession. The opening ceremony took place on 29 September 1912. The construction was financed by the Lloyd Society, established in 1866 by representatives of farmers and grain wholesalers from Banat. The Lloyd Palace was the first building built in Victory Square after the National Theatre. Timișoara architect Arnold Merbl took care of its construction.

On the second and third floors there were apartments, and on the first floor, the Lloyd Palace hosted numerous institutions and societies over time, such as the Merchandise and Agricultural Exchange of the Lloyd Society during the time of Baron István Ambrózy and the director of the Lloyd Society Salomon Sternthal, the Merchants' Union, the Lloyd Society and Club, the General State Security Inspectorate and the Police Inspectorate. In 1945, the Chamber of Commerce and Industry, which inherited the palace after the liquidation of the Lloyd Society, donated it to the newly established West University. Since 1948, the palace was nationalized and became the headquarters of the Rectorate of the Politehnica University of Timișoara.

During World War I, from 15 September to 18 October 1915, the headquarters of the German troops was installed in the Lloyd Palace. At that time, Marshal August von Mackensen, the supreme commander of the German army in the Balkans, was housed on the second floor of the building, in the apartment of a rich Jewish family, Rózsavölgyi. On 19 February 1919, the Paris Peace Conference sent an information commission led by American General Goodwin to Timișoara. He discussed with French General Farret, Serbian General Grujić and Serbian Bishop Letić, and in the great hall of the Lloyd Palace he heard all the leaders of the nationalities of Banat. As a result of this visit, the existence of the Banat Republic, which had aspired to autonomy within Hungary, ended and the decision was made to compensate Romania for the territory ceded to Serbia. This is how Timișoara came under Romanian administration.

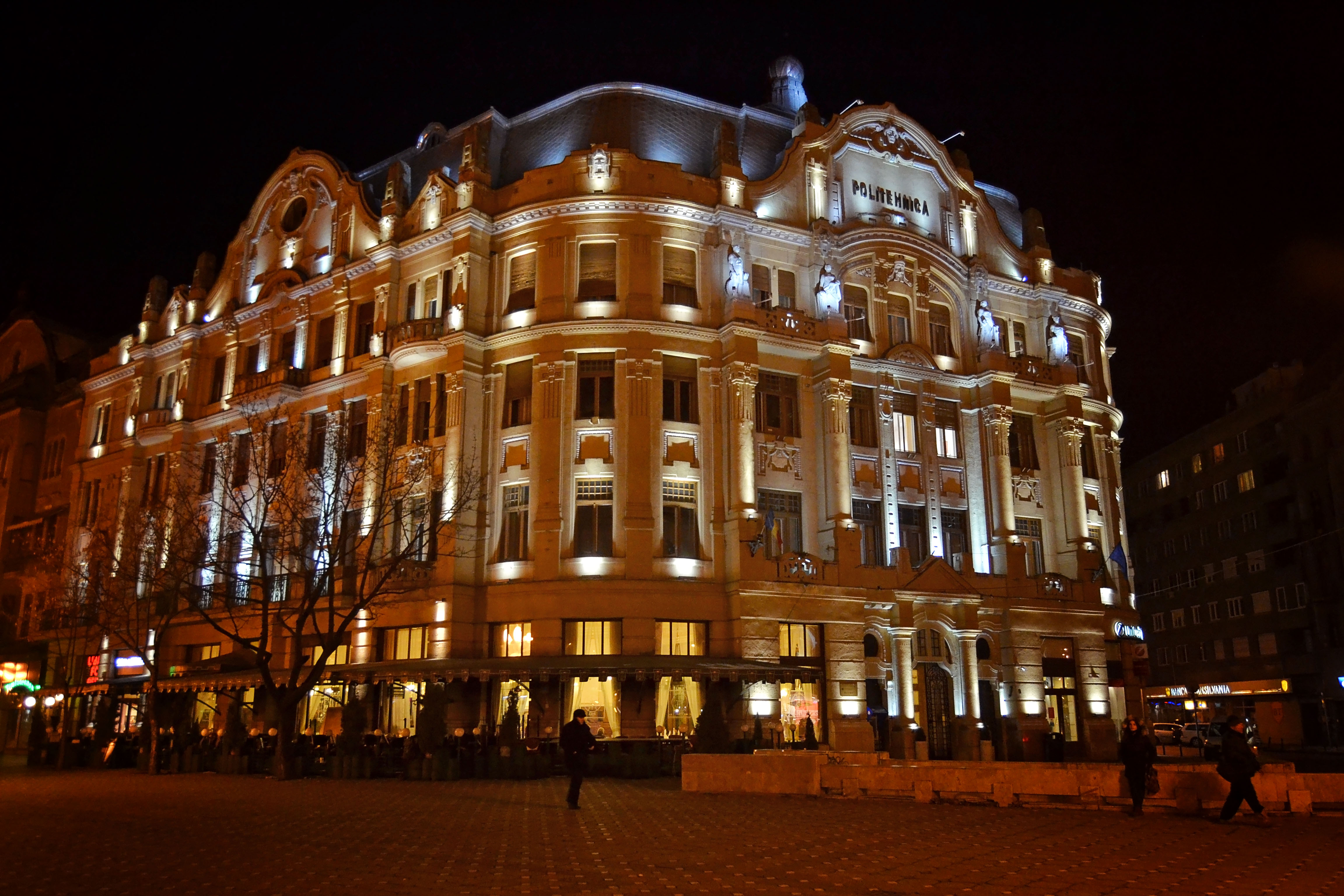
Architectural lighting on Lloyd Palace

On the ground floor of the building, Baumhorn designed the generous space of the Lloyd café, where the paneling and furniture were made by the Lehman family of craftsmen from Timișoara. This large local was a well-known meeting place of the high life of the time. In its early days it was known as Café Wien. Lloyd café opened on 26 June 1926. Schlager, operetta, dance and jazz café-concerts were held here almost daily, with performers such as accordionists Paul Schönberger and Imre Hirschl, percussionists Elemér Kohn and Paul Gerö, pianist Gheorghe Klein and violinist Andrei Wertheimer. In 1948, the restaurant began to be administered by a state enterprise, being alternately called 23 August and Bulevard. In 2000, the local took over its original name, Lloyd, and today it continues to be a popular restaurant with 120 seats and an 80-seat terrace.

== Architecture ==
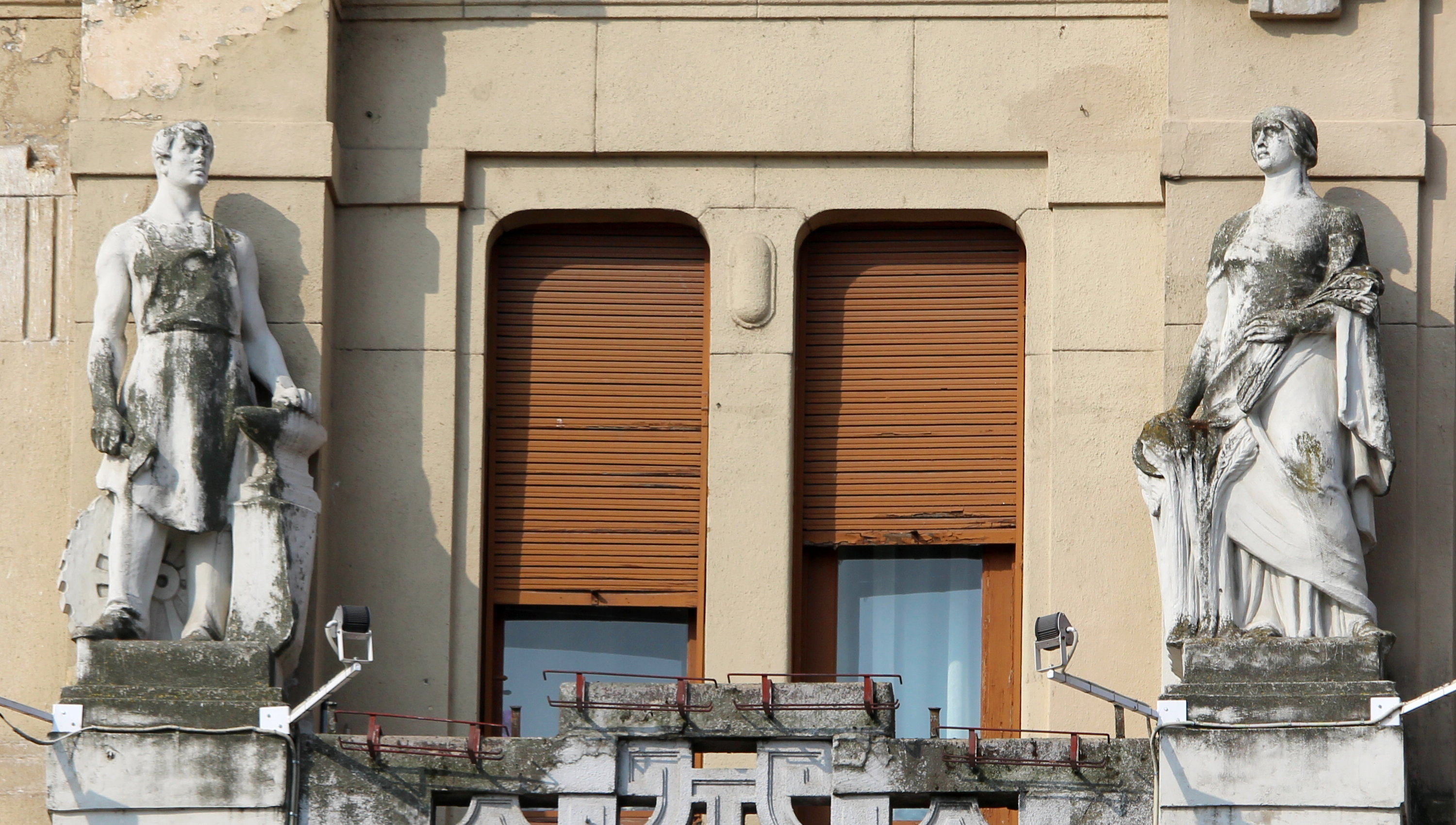
Statues on the façade of Lloyd Palace

Described as "the most beautiful house in Timișoara" by Josef Geml, former mayor of Timișoara, Lloyd Palace is distinguished by its undulating contours and rounded corners. The façade, adorned with statues, bas-reliefs, and decorative elements typical of the Secession style, is complemented by eclectic features—such as apparent columns, geometric ornaments, and a neoclassical portal—which add a note of sobriety and refined simplicity. The composition is arranged in registers that grow progressively more richly decorated, culminating in the monumental attic, whose height exceeds that of a full floor.
