= Timișoara Orthodox Cathedral =

Church in Timișoara, Romania

Orthodox Cathedral
- Catedrala Ortodoxă

Religion
- Affiliation: Romanian Orthodox
- Ecclesiastical or organizational status: Metropolis of Banat
- Patron: Three Holy Hierarchs
- Year consecrated: 1946
- Status: Active
- Administrator: Eugen Goanță

Location
- Location: King Ferdinand I Boulevard, Timișoara
- Country: Romania
- Interactive map of Orthodox Cathedral
- Coordinates: 45°45′2″N 21°13′27″E

Architecture
- Architect: Ion Trajanescu
- Style: Neo-Moldavian
- General contractor: Tiberiu Eremia
- Groundbreaking: 1936
- Completed: 1940
- Construction cost: 30 million lei

Specifications
- Capacity: 5,000
- Length: 63 m
- Width: 32 m
- Height (max): 90.5 m
- Dome: 11

The Orthodox Cathedral (Romanian: Catedrala Ortodoxă), also known as the Metropolitan Cathedral (Romanian: Catedrala Mitropolitană), is a Romanian Orthodox church in Timișoara, in Romania. The cathedral is the seat of the Archbishopric of Timișoara and the Metropolis of Banat. It is dedicated to the Three Holy Hierarchs, Basil the Great, Gregory the Theologian and John Chrysostom.

Built on an area of 1,542 m^{2}, it has 11 towers, of which the central one has a height of 90.5 m, making it the second tallest church in Romania, after the People's Salvation Cathedral in Bucharest. The cathedral is listed in the National Register of Historic Monuments.

== History ==
In July 1919, part of the Banat was united with Romania. The new Romanian administration took a series of measures to encourage Orthodoxy, neglected by the previous Austro-Hungarian administration, which was only favorable to the Catholic religion. Thus, the Bishopric of Timișoara was created, elevated to the rank of archbishopric in 1939, and in 1947 the Metropolis of Banat was established.

There was an obvious need to build a new place of worship, commensurate with the Orthodox community in Timișoara and the Romanian Banat. At the initiative of the parish of Cetate (the historic center of Timișoara), a fund for the construction of the new church was set up and an appeal was launched to parishioners for donations. In 1936, all the preconditions for starting construction already existed. The financial fund for the building was already collected, although the total amount needed was very high for those times. The necessary land, located at the crossroads of the most important arteries of the city, was donated by the City Hall, and the project of the church was entrusted since 1934 to the architect Ion Trajanescu. The project provided for a building with a capacity of 5,000 people. The City Hall provided all the bricks free of charge, and the Reșița Steel Works made a 30% discount on the purchase price of 330 tons of iron.

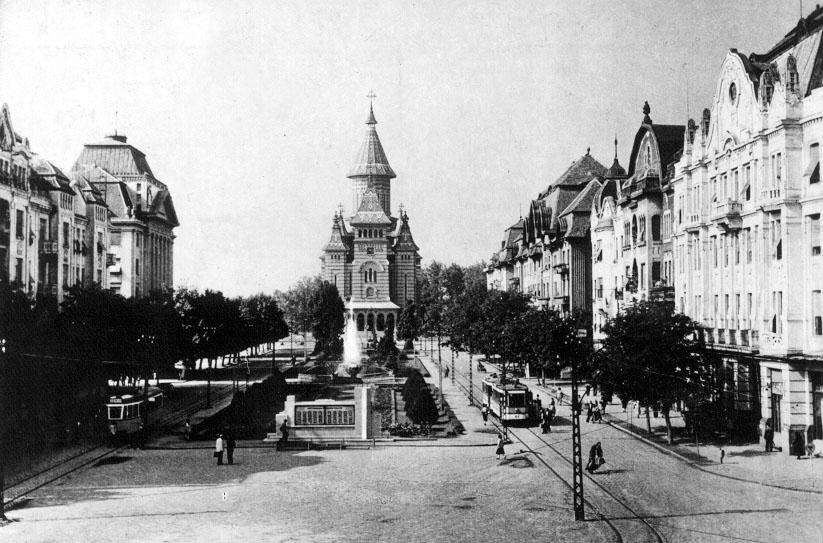
The cathedral and Victory Square in the interwar period

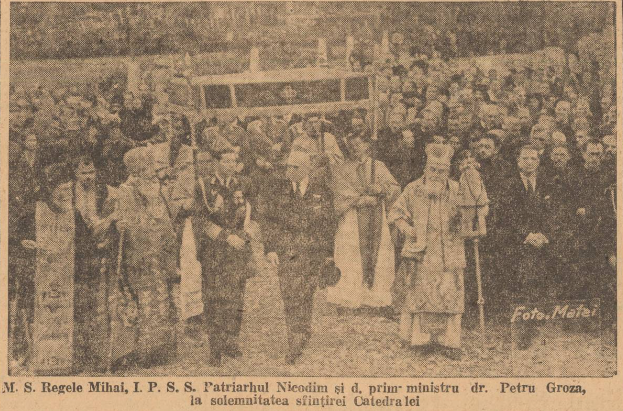
King Michael I, Patriarch Nicodim and Prime Minister Petru Groza attending the consecration service of the cathedral on 6 October 1946

The actual construction began on 16 March 1936. On 20 December of the same year, a solemn service was held, laying the foundation stone of the future cathedral (which was consecrated by Bishop Andrei Magieru of Arad). The execution of the construction works was done by Tiberiu Eremia's company from Bucharest. The church bells and crosses were consecrated on 23 August 1938. The final reception of the construction works took place on 9 July 1940, and the parish council approved this reception on 24 July. The cathedral was inaugurated on 6 October 1946 in the presence of King Michael I, Prime Minister Petru Groza, Patriarch Nicodim Munteanu, Bishop of Timișoara Vasile Lăzărescu, Metropolitan of Transylvania Nicolae Bălan and representatives of other cults, led by Roman Catholic bishop Augustin Pacha and Greek Catholic bishop Ioan Bălan. During World War II, after Romania turned its weapons against Germany, German aircraft bombed Timișoara (30–31 October 1944). Six bombs fell on the cathedral, but only one of them exploded, causing significant but limited damage. The interior and exterior painting was finished only in 1956, due to World War II and the difficult period that followed.

== Architecture ==
The dome of the Pantocrator

The building's style is neo-Moldavian, based on Romanian Orthodox, late Renaissance, Ottoman and Byzantine architecture elements, such as niches under the eaves, ribbed star vaulting in the interior and lacquered discs in a variety of colors. Such elements can be found in the old Cozia and Prislop monasteries, typical for the 14th century. The church is a fortunate "head of perspective" of the Victory Square in front of it. The style of the building is not entirely extraneous to the 1900s architecture in the square, also characterized by the ample play of roofs.

63 meters long and 32 meters wide, the cathedral owes its monumentality to the height of its middle dome – the dome of the Pantocrator (the Almighty). 52 meters high on the inside and 83 meters high on the outside, the middle dome is surmounted by a 7-meter-high cross and sustained by 10 decorative chains and golden buckles. At one point, the building was the third tallest in the country, after Casa Scânteii (104 m) and the People's House (84 m), both located in Bucharest. Due to the marshy terrain, the cathedral stands on a concrete slab supported by 1,186 reinforced concrete pillars, driven at a depth of 20 m. The built area is 1,542 m^{2}, while the total construction volume is about 50,000 m^{3}. The seven bells, cast in Anton Novotny's workshop, have a total weight of 7,000 kg and were made of an alloy of metals brought from Indonesia (Sumatra and Borneo). Their harmonization was done by the composer Sabin Drăgoi. The interior and exterior painting was executed by a group of painters led by the painter Anastase Demian. The iconostasis was carved and gilded in 22-carat gold by master Ștefan Gajo, who also made the three chandeliers, the two candlesticks and the Lord's Tomb (located in the pronaos).

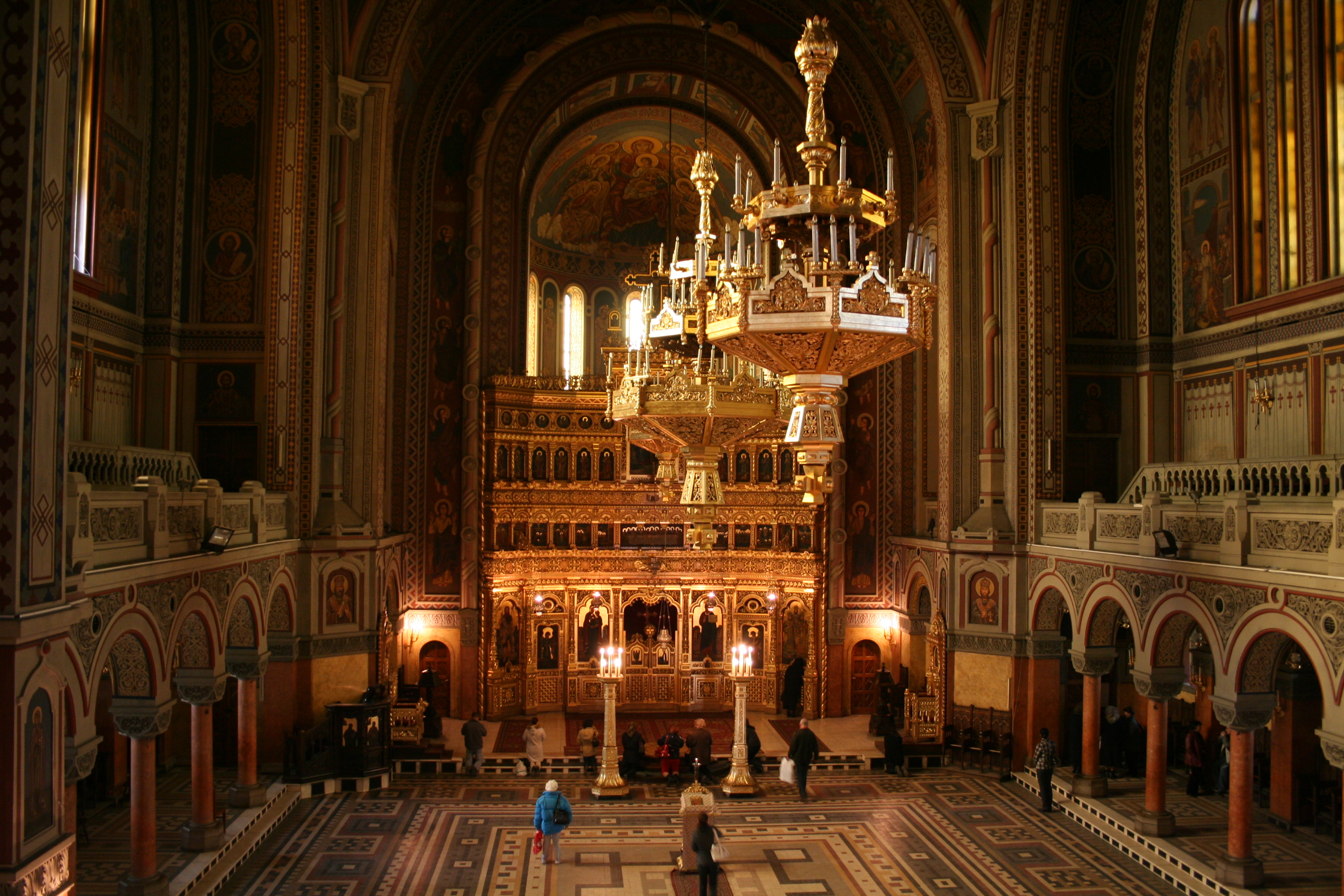
The interior of the cathedral

The plan shape of the cathedral is the typical Byzantine one, in the shape of a cross, the interior being divided into narthex, pronaos, naos and altar. On either side of the pronaos are the side galleries. Above the awning, towards the pronaos, is the balcony of the choir, which can accommodate 150 people. The interior of the cathedral is illuminated by 16 windows in the main dome and 30 side windows. The exterior walls of the church are clad in apparent red and yellow-orange brick, as well as glazed discs and painted niches. In the middle of the facade is a mosaic icon of the cathedral's patrons, the Three Holy Hierarchs. Maria Laurenția Minulescu, the daughter of the poet Ion Minulescu, executed this 5.25-square-meter mosaic. The towers are covered with glazed tiles, made in Jimbolia, which contain the colors of the national flag (red, yellow, blue) on a green background. At the top of the towers are six crosses, three miters and six "heads" of crosses. The crosses were made by Iacob Schwab's company from Timișoara. The open hallway of the cathedral is supported by six large marble columns, each placed on a square pedestal. The entrance to the church is made through three massive doors in two wings, carved both outside and inside. There are also entrance doors on the sides, also carved. The entrance doors, the rows of chairs and the entire furniture along the sides of the naos and pronaos are the works of the sculptor Traian Novac. The interior decorations (pilasters, capitals, friezes, railings, frames, cases, etc.) were made by Ioan Cristescu's company from Bucharest. The floor of the church made of mosaic tiles combines the style and color of the Banat carpets, being executed according to the sketches of the painter Catul Bogdan.

== Museum exhibitions ==
The cathedral houses the relics of Joseph the New, considered the protector of the Romanian Orthodox in Banat, former Orthodox bishop of Timișoara (1651–1655), who came from Mount Athos and then retreated to the Partoș Monastery. On 25 February 1950, the Holy Synod of the Romanian Orthodox Church decided to canonize Joseph the New, as well as to relocate his relics from the church of the Partoș Monastery to the Metropolitan Cathedral of Timișoara.

In the basement of the cathedral is the collection of religious art of the Metropolis of Banat. This collection, organized at the initiative of Nicolae Corneanu since 1962, includes objects of ancient religious art from all over Banat. The collection currently holds over 3,000 rare volumes of church books, over 800 religious icons and paintings and over 130 church objects (precious metal artifacts, clothing and ornaments). There is also a collection of early writings in Romanian. Examples include the 1648 Noul Testament de la Bălgrad ("The New Testament of Bălgrad") and the 1643 Cazania lui Varlaam ("The Homiliary of Varlaam"). The side of the basement from the altar includes the necropolis of the metropolitans of Banat. The first metropolitan buried here was Vasile Lăzărescu (metropolitan during 1947–1961).

== See also ==
- List of largest Eastern Orthodox church buildings

== See also ==
- List of largest Eastern Orthodox church buildings
- List of tallest domes
