= Queen Marie Park, Timișoara =

Park in Romania

Queen Marie Park
- People's Park
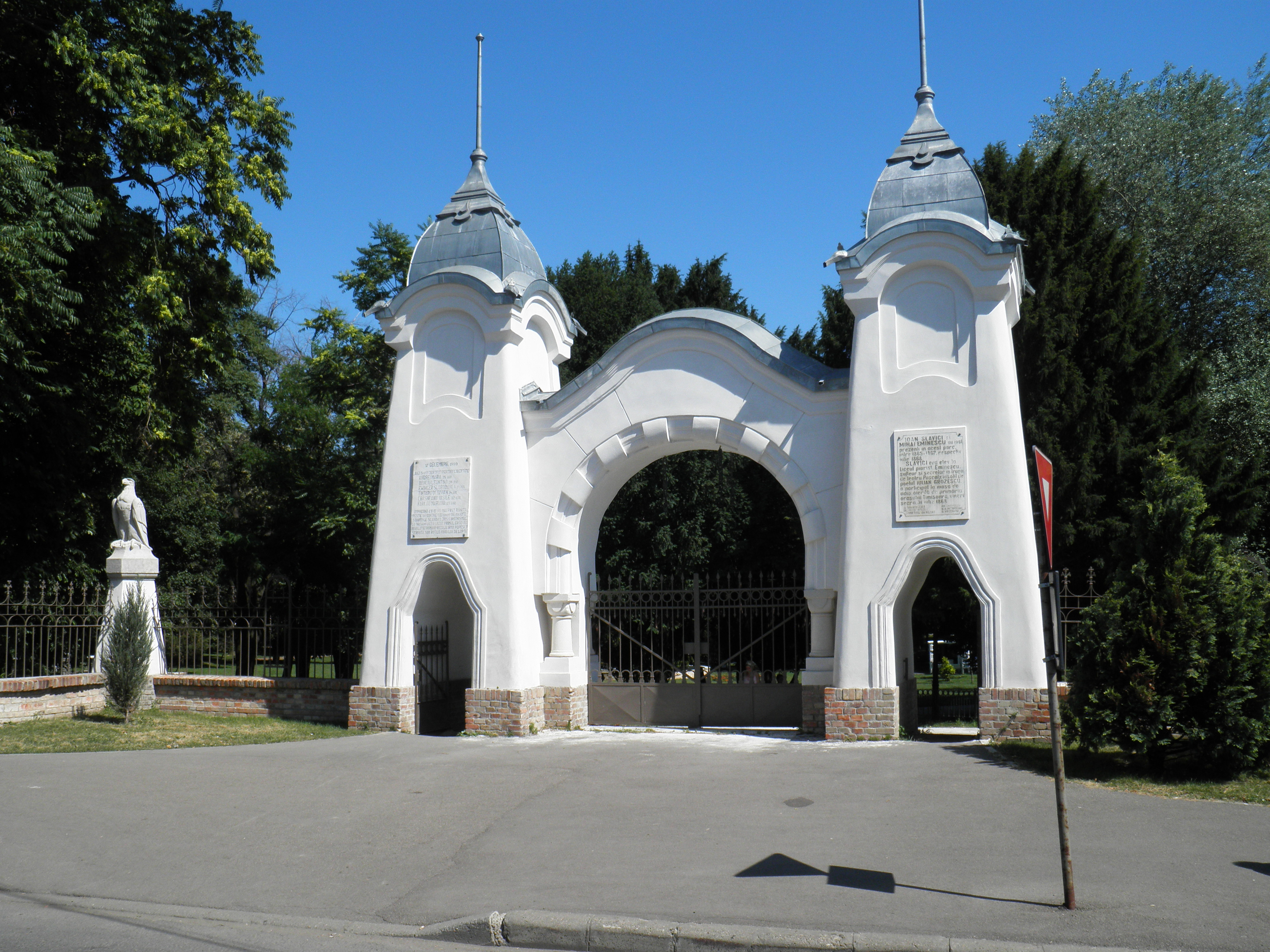
- The main entrance to the Queen Marie Park
- Interactive map of Queen Marie Park
- Type: Urban park
- Location: Timișoara, Romania
- Coordinates: 45°45′21.64″N 21°14′34.57″E
- Area: 4.51 ha
- Opened: 1859; 167 years ago
- Founder: Johann Baptist Coronini-Cronberg
- Etymology: Marie of Romania
- Administrator: Timișoara City Hall
- Public transit: Tram lines 1, 2, 4, 5, 6

Queen Marie Park (Romanian: Parcul „Regina Maria”), previously known as Coronini Park or People's Park, is the oldest park in Timișoara, located on the right side of the Bega Canal.

== Location ==
The park is located in Fabric district, between Johann Heinrich Pestalozzi Street, Dniester Way, Episcop Joseph Lonovici Street and 3 August 1919 Boulevard. It has an area of 45,100 m^{2}, of which 37,400 m^{2} represent lawn and trees, and 5,300 m^{2} are alleys, the rest being other spaces.

== History ==
Between 1849 and 1861, part of the Non ædificandi belt between Cetate and Fabric was transformed at the initiative of Johann Baptist Coronini-Cronberg, the military governor of the Voivodeship of Serbia and Banat of Temeschwar, into a park organized on a 7-jugerum (~ 2-ha) land. It was the first landscaping on a part of the so-called esplanade that surrounded the fortress, where no interventions had been allowed until then. In 1857, the First Savings House of Timișoara (Erste Temeswarer Sparkassa) contributed 200 forints to the realization of the initial project. Coronini Park, as it would be called until 1867, was inaugurated in 1859. It was taken over by the city in 1868, and in 1910 it was surrounded by an iron fence with stone pillars. After the Austro-Hungarian Compromise of 1867, the park was named Városliget, Hungarian for "City Park". Later, however, through urbanization and the construction of roads and bridges, three parks were separated from the former Városliget: the Roses Park, the Justice Park and the Cathedral Park. During the communist period, the park was known first as Youth Park and later as People's Park, a name it retained until 2011. That year marked the beginning of a comprehensive two-year rehabilitation, during which a bust of the queen was installed at the park's center and the original fence dating back to the 1910s was restored and reinforced.

In the park is the former Apollo Cinema, which was originally built in 1909 by architect Josef Ecker, Jr. and rebuilt in 1955 by architect Paul Schuster.

== Flora ==
The park extends over approximately four and a half hectares and contains a diverse range of tree species, including rare yew and pine specimens as well as centuries-old oaks. Distinctive plantings have been incorporated throughout the landscape, with individual areas featuring notable trees such as a copper beech accompanied by hydrangeas or a white poplar situated among evergreen yews.
