= Justice Park =

Justice Park may refer to:

== Places ==
- Justice Park, former name of Court Square Park in Charlottesville, Virginia
- Justice Park, Timișoara, urban park in central Timișoara, Romania
- Washington Gladden Social Justice Park, public park in the Discovery District of Downtown Columbus, Ohio
- Spirit of Justice Park, public park in Washington, D.C.

== People ==
- John Duane Park (1819–1896), chief justice of the Connecticut Supreme Court

== See also ==
- Francis Neal Parke (1871–1955), justice of the Maryland Court of Appeals
