= Caroline Charrière =

Swiss composer (1960–2018)

- Born: December 26, 1960
- Died: October 1, 2018 (aged 57)
- Era: Contemporary

Caroline Charrière (26 December 1960 – 1 October 2018) was a Swiss composer, conductor, flautist and educator. From 2000 on she concentrated on composing, creating chamber music, choral music and orchestral pieces. In 2001, she established her reputation as a composer with the oratorio Le livre de Job (The Book of Job) for mixed choir, bass, soprano and orchestra. Her works have since been performed widely in Switzerland and abroad.

== Biography ==
Born in Fribourg, Charrière studied transverse flute at the Lausanne Conservatory under Pierre Wavre, earning diplomas in teaching (1982) and concert performance (1984). She also began studying orchestration and composition in Lausanne under Jean Balissat, followed by post-graduate study at the Royal Northern College of Music in Manchester, England. She received her orchestral conducting diploma from the Lausanne Conservatory in 1994.

Charrière taught the flute at the Fribourg Conservatory, established the "Choeur de Jade", a female choir, became the director of other Fribourg choirs and composed her own works. As a result of increasing interest in her compositions, in 2000 she decided to concentrate first and foremost on composing.

In August 2017, Charrière won the second prize in the "Aufbruch" contest for female composers for her composition Awakening for wind quintet (two trumpets, a horn, a trombone and a tuba). The contest is jointly organized by the publisher Furore Verlag and Zentrum Militärmusik der Bundeswehr (the German Army Military Music Centre).

Charrière died in 2018 at age 57.
