= André Jouve =

French conductor and radio producer (1929–2019)

André Jouve (French pronunciation: [ɑ̃dʁe ʒuv]), born 1929, died 2 March 2019 was a French conductor and radio producer, active mainly in France, who left a number of recordings and was for many years associated with classical music on French Radio.

== Life and career ==
Jouve studied at the Conservatoire de Paris, and took a keen interest in baroque music in the 1950s, and notably recorded Charpentier's Messe de minuit with the Ensemble vocal de Paris, which won a Grand Prix du disque in 1954. He conducted in Paris and Stuttgart including the Orchestre de la Société des Concerts du Conservatoire. Jouve was the chorus director for the 1952 Aix-en Provence festival production of Iphigénie en Tauride, conducted by Carlo Maria Giulini, later recorded for Vox Records.

He joined the ORTF in 1969, becoming head of the musical research group (GRM) which had been founded by Pierre Schaeffer in 1958. Five years later he was running the Orchestre lyrique and the Orchestre de chambre of the ORTF which lasted until 1975. He was later the administrator of Radio France's Nouvel Orchestre Philharmonique and from 1981 he was coordinator of programming and music services at France Musique. After leaving Radio France he was part of a working group of the European Broadcasting Union. He was President of the Centre National d'Artistes Lyriques (CNIPAL) from 1995 to 2005.

== Recordings ==
Jouve's recordings include the following works, with record company labels and year given where available:

- Bach - Concertos for harpsichord, Nos. 3 & 7 (Stuttgart Opera Orchestra, Frank Pelleg) Ducretet Thomson
- Bartok - Sonata for Two Pianos and Percussion, Divertimento for String Orchestra (Stuttgart Opera Orchestra, Geneviève Joy, Jacqueline Bonneau, Pierre Naudin, Jean-Claude Tavernier) Ducretet-Thomson
- Marc-Antoine Charpentier - Messe de Minuit (Ensemble Vocal de Paris) Ducretet Thomson, 1954
- Delibes - Lakmé, three extracts (Orchestre des Concerts Lamoureux, Pierrette Alarie) Philips 1956
- Dvorak - Cello Concerto and Slavonic Dances 4 & 5 (South West German Rundfunk Baden-Baden, Guy Fallot) Ducretet-Thomson, 1950s
- Hahn - Mozart (Orchestre des Concerts Francais) Ducretet-Thomson
- Hossein - Piano concerto N° 2, Miniatures persanes, Estampe japonaise (Orchestre du Théâtre des Champs-Élysées, Geneviève Joy) Ducretet-Thomson 1956
- Mozart - opera and concert arias, from Die Zauberflöte, Exultate Jubilate, Le Nozze di Figaro, Popoli di Tessaglia!, Die Entführung aus dem Serail, Il re pastore (Orchestre du Théâtre des Champs-Élysées, Pierrette Alarie) Ducretet-Thomson Records
- Mozart - arias from Idomeneo ('Zeffiretti lusinghieri' and 'Se il padre perdei') and Die Zauberflöte ('Ach, ich fühl's, es ist verschwunden') (Teresa Stich-Randall, Orchestre du Théâtre des Champs-Élysées de Paris) Telefunken TW 30 055
- Prokofiev - The Ugly Duckling, Op. 18, Overture On Hebrew Themes, Op. 34, Summer Day Suite, Op. 65a (Orchestre du Théâtre des Champs-Élysées, Françoise Ogéas) Ducretet-Thomson 1956
- Jean-Féry Rebel - Les Éléments (Orchestre Lyrique de l'ORTF) Office de Radiodiffusion-Télévision Française (ORTF) 1974
- Vivaldi - Concertos for Bassoon, Flute and Oboe (Nouvel Orchestre de Chambre de Paris) Ducretet Thomson, 1954
- Vivaldi - Gloria Mass (Ensemble Vocal de Paris, Orchestre de la Société des Concerts du Conservatoire) Ducretet Thomson, 1954
- French Renaissance Choral Music (Ensemble Vocal de Paris) Ducretet Thomson
- Music by Benhamou, Fortner, Bosseur (Ensemble Instrumental de Royaumont) Royaumont, 1967
