= Apollo Cinema =

Defunct Romanian theater

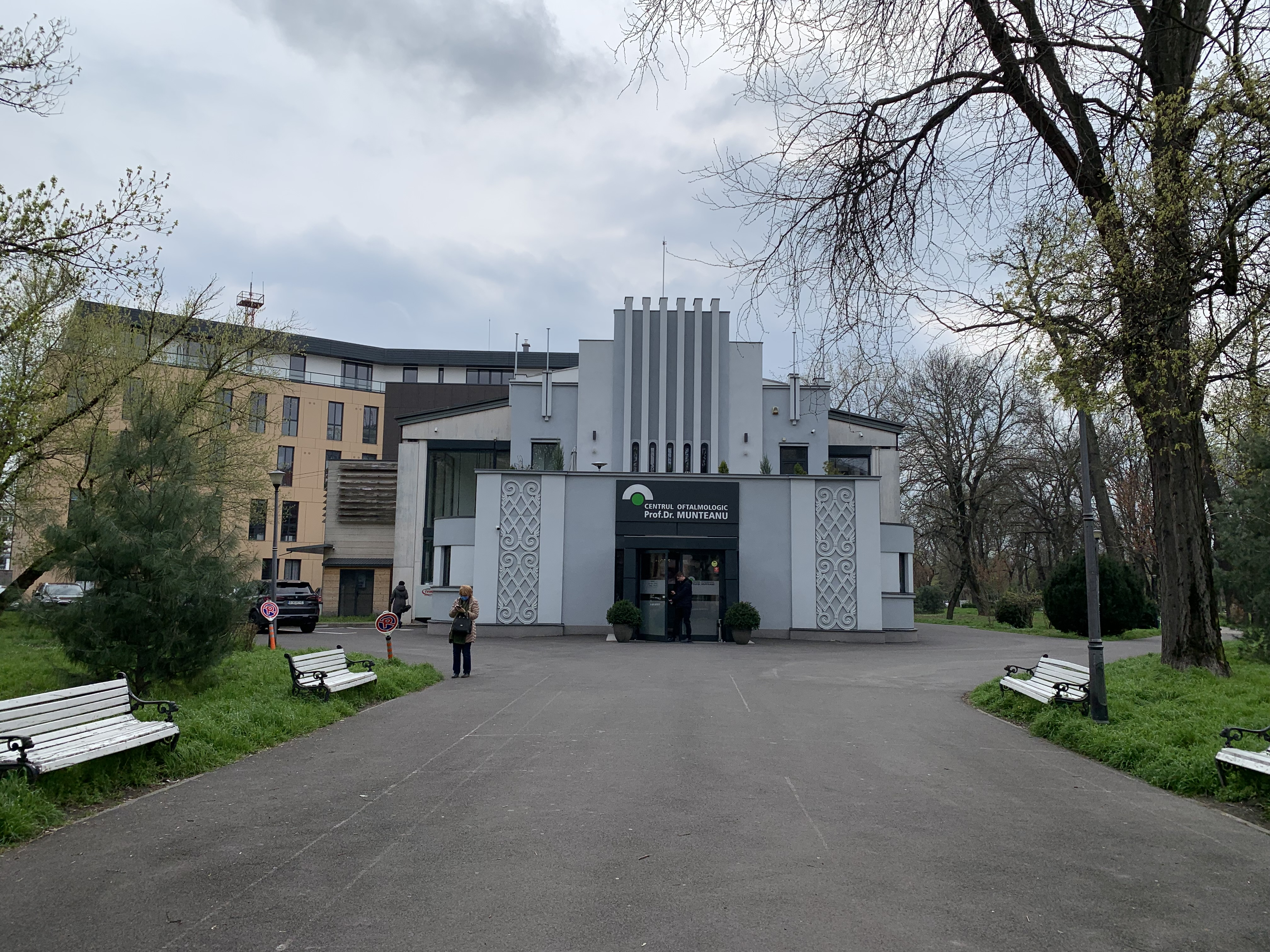
- Interactive map of Apollo Cinema
- Former names: Parc Cinema; Tineretului Cinema
- Address: 2 3 August 1919 Boulevard, Timișoara
- Coordinates: 45°45′22″N 21°14′40″E
- Type: Cinema
- Current use: Ophthalmology center

Construction
- Opened: 4 May 1909
- Renovated: 1955
- Architects: Josef Ecker Jr. (1909); Paul von Schuster (1955)

Apollo Cinema is a former cinema in the western Romanian city of Timișoara. Later known as Parc Cinema, this cinema was built in 1909 and is the second oldest in Timișoara. The original building, with its dome, decorations, and classicist pediment, was significantly modified in the 1950s by incorporating the modernist style.

== History ==
Apollo Cinema was the second cinema established in Timișoara, following the first one in Cetate. Known as the "Theatre of Moving Images," the Cetate cinema was built in 1908, while Apollo Cinema opened its doors in 1909. It was located in Coronini Park, within the Fabric district, an area now known as Queen Marie Park.

The building was designed by architect Josef Ecker Jr. and opened on 4 May 1909. Josef Ecker Jr., who also designed Timișoara's first cinema, retained ownership of that one, while the Apollo Cinema was handed over to architect Georg Pflum for management. Together, Ecker and Pflum acquired the land from the city hall and then divided the cinemas between them. Although the city hall was only allowed to repurchase the cinemas ten years after their construction, it bought both on 1 July 1913, paying 7,500 crowns for the first and 37,000 crowns for the second. The revenue generated from the two cinemas was used to support social aid programs for the Queen Marie Orphanage, the city's elderly home, and funds for impoverished families.

On 15 July 1924, the new summer cinema in Fabric was inaugurated and thereafter became known as Apollo Cinema with the Summer Garden. That same year, Timișoara had three winter cinemas and three summer cinemas located in the Cetate, Fabric, and Mehala districts. The general director of the municipal cinemas at the time was Ioan Popovici.

On 7 March 1930, the interim commission of Timișoara approved the introduction of sound films at the Capitol (in Cetate) and Apollo cinemas, aiming for the best quality equipment and a completion deadline set for that autumn. However, this plan was only realized in 1931. Both the winter and summer cinemas in Fabric were equipped with sound systems, which were rented for a 10-year period from the Klang-Film company in Berlin.

The Apollo Cinema remained in operation until 1954, when it underwent a year-long renovation and modernization led by architect Paul von Schuster. Subsequently, the cinema was renamed "Parc." Following the Revolution, the building was repurposed several times, serving as a disco, billiard club, nightclub, and ophthalmology center. The most recent renovations took place in 2005, overseen by architect Romeo Szorad.
