= Capitol Cinema (Timișoara) =

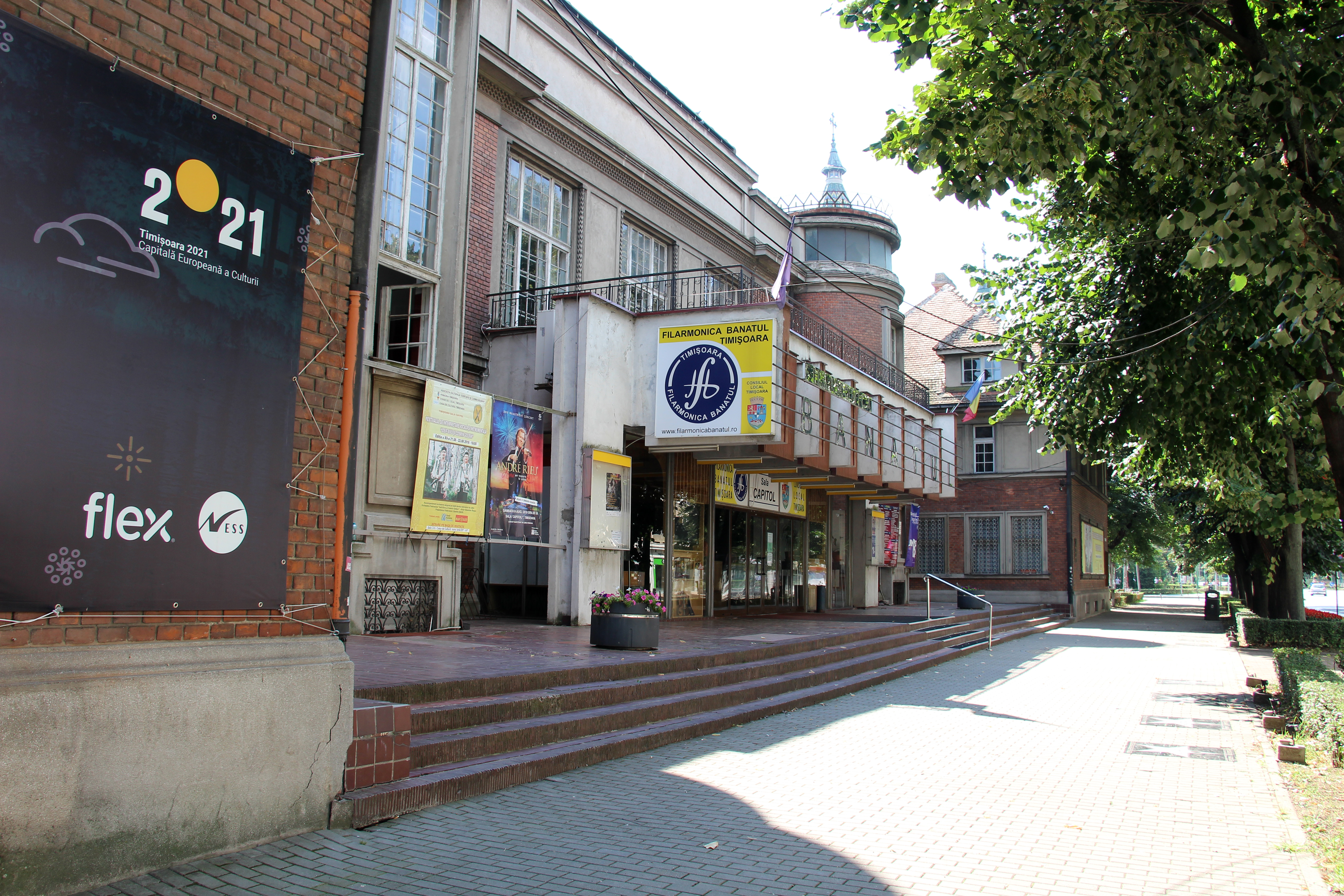
- Interactive map of Capitol Cinema
- Former names: Modern Cinema; Maxim Gorky Cinema
- Address: 2 Constantin Diaconovici Loga Boulevard, Timișoara
- Coordinates: 45°45′2″N 21°13′34″E
- Owner: Timișoara City Hall
- Operator: Banat Philharmonic
- Type: Cinema
- Current use: Concert hall

Construction
- Groundbreaking: 6 December 1929
- Opened: 25 December 1930
- Renovated: 1931, 1972
- Years active: 1930–1994
- Cost: 15 million lei
- Architect: Duiliu Marcu

Capitol Cinema is a former cinema in the western Romanian city of Timișoara. Currently, it hosts the Banat Philharmonic, and films are only screened outdoors in its summer garden.

== History ==
In 1908, Timișoara saw the opening of its first cinema, Cetate Cinema. Over time, however, the building fell into serious disrepair and required extensive restoration. Because such rehabilitation would have taken a long time, and demand for cinema performances was growing—evidenced by the increasing audiences at both Cetate Cinema and Apollo Cinema—a decision was made in 1927 to construct a new venue: Capitol Cinema.

The architectural plans were entrusted to Duiliu Marcu from Bucharest, and the construction was financed by the city hall. Initially, the cost was estimated at 20 million lei, but negotiations with the contractor brought the total down to 15 million lei. Construction began on 6 December 1929, and the cinema officially opened on Christmas Day in 1930.

Alongside the main building, a summer garden was included to host outdoor screenings—a familiar concept for locals, who had already experienced similar setups at Cetate Cinema and Apollo Cinema. The last film shown in Capitol's summer garden was in the summer of 1994.

Over the years, Capitol Cinema was also known by other names, including "Modern" and "Maxim Gorky." In 1931, it had to be rebuilt after the roof collapsed and damaged the auditorium. Another major renovation and modernization took place in 1972, during which the cinema was also expanded under the supervision of architect Șerban Sturdza.

By the year 2000, Capitol Cinema was one of seven cinemas operating in Timișoara, alongside Dacia, Timiș, Arta, Melodia, Studio, and Unirea.

Capitol Cinema, like all cinemas in Timișoara, was once part of the Autonomous Film Directorate (RADEF). However, following the Revolution, ownership was returned to the original proprietors. After a series of legal proceedings, the Capitol Cinema—along with its summer garden—was eventually reclaimed by Timișoara City Hall. Today, the building houses the Banat Philharmonic, though film screenings are still occasionally held. In 2014, the cinema's summer garden underwent a complete renovation with the help of volunteers, students, Banat Philharmonic staff, and prison inmates. Together, they restored the screen, replaced the chairs with new ones, planted flowers, and refurbished the fountain. Additionally, a new sound system was installed to enhance the viewing experience.
