= Lausanne Conservatory =

Music school in Romandy, Switzerland

Coordinates: 46.5187°N 6.6331°E

Conservatory of Lausanne
- Haute école de musique de Lausanne
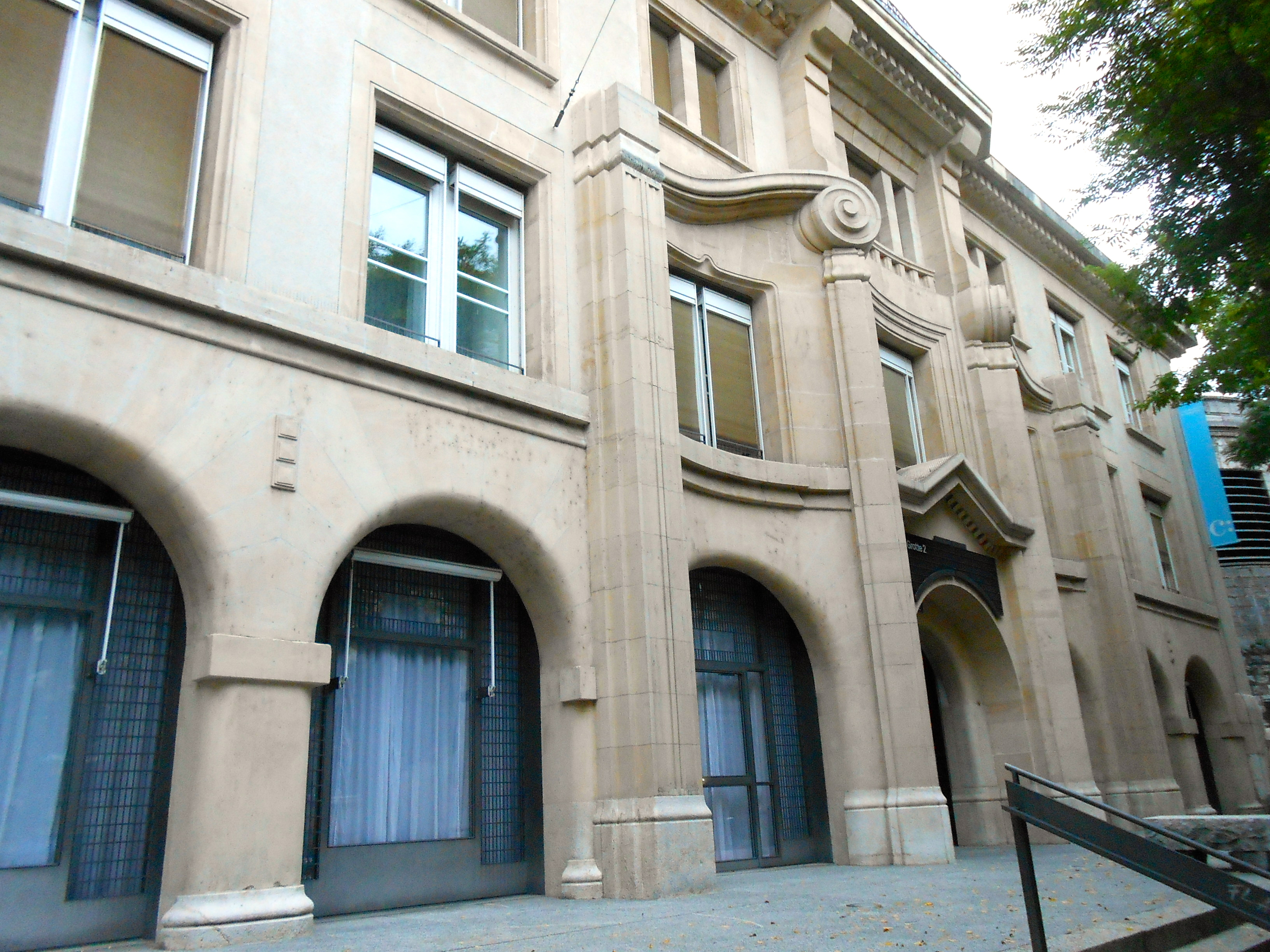
- West entrance of the Conservatory of Lausanne
- Established: 1861; 165 years ago
- Parent institution: University of Applied Sciences Western Switzerland
- Director: Hervé Klopfenstein (fr)
- Location: Romandy, Switzerland
- Language: French
- Website: www.hemu.ch

The Haute école de musique de Lausanne (HEMU, known as Institute of Advanced Musical Studies prior to 2010, founded in 1861 as Conservatoire de Lausanne) is a Swiss music school located in Romandy, the French-speaking western part of Switzerland. It is a constituent institution of the University of Applied Sciences Western Switzerland.

== History ==
Name change in 2010

Until the summer of 2010, the name, "Conservatoire de Lausanne", referred to two schools with different objectives and faculties. The Music School was public institution for educating children and young adults. The Institute of Advanced Musical Studies, based in Lausanne, Sion, and Fribourg, offered a comprehensive higher education for aspiring professional musicians. To mitigate the ensuing confusion, administrators in 2010 launched two new distinct identities. The School of Music became the Lausanne Conservatory and the Lausanne Institute of Advanced Musical Studies adopted the acronym HEMU for Haute école de musique. On 1 September 2008 the classical music schools of Sion and Fribourg integrated with HEMU.

Founding in 1861

The Haute école de musique de Lausanne was founded in 1861 as the Conservatoire de Lausanne with a mandate of training and educating aspiring professional musicians. HEMU is a comprehensive music school that offers degrees leading to accredited bachelor's and master's degrees. HEMU has a cooperative affiliation with the University of Applied Sciences Western Switzerland.

College divisions

HEMU currently has two divisions: Classical and Jazz. In 2013, approximately 300 students were enrolled in Classical and 60 in Jazz. According to the HEMU website, its jazz department is the only one of its kind in French-speaking Switzerland. Jazz at HEMU was launched in 2006.

Library

HEMU has a large music library of scores, literature, references, and recordings.

Pre-college division

Lausanne Conservatory for children and young adults has, as of 2012, an enrollment of about 1,200 students.

Theater school

In 1909, the institution launched an acting school — Section professionnelle d'art dramatique du Conservatoire de Lausanne (SPAD). As of 2003, the acting school has been located in the Haute École de théâtre ("High School of Theater" or "HESTR") in Romandy.

== Accreditation ==
The HEMU bachelor's and master's degrees are accredited by the Swiss government and the Music and Performing Arts division of the University of Applied Sciences Western Switzerland (HES-SO), Switzerland's largest institution of constituent schools and colleges involved in research, higher education, and professional training. HEMU is a member of the European Association of Conservatoires.

== Notable faculty and alumni ==
=== HEMU directors ===
- 1861–1905: Gustavus Adolphus Koella
- 1905–1908: Émile-Robert Blanchet (1877–1943), pianist
- 1908–1921: Jules Nicati (1873–1939)
- 1921–1941: Charles Troyon (1867–1948)
- 1941–1957: Alfred Pochon (fr) (1878–1959), violinist and musicologist
- 1957–1967: Carlo Hemmerling (de) (1903–1967)
- 1967–1968: Edmond Defrancesco (interim)
- 1968–1972: Rainer Bösch (born 1938), composer
- 1972–1983: Michel Rochat
- 1984–1998: Jean-Jacques Rapin (de) (1932–2015)
- 1998–2001: Olivier Cuendet
- 2001–2010: Pierre Wavre
- Since 2010: Hervé Klopfenstein (fr) (1957–), conductor, theory, flutist †

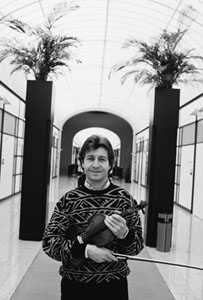
Pierre Amoyal, in the Conservatory of Lausanne

=== HEMU faculty ===
- Roger Bobo (born 1938), low-brass virtuoso
- 1947–1960: Hans Haug (1900–1967), composer
- 1904–1917: Émile-Robert Blanchet (1877–1943), pianist
- 1973–1990: Ayla Erduran (tr) (1934–2025)
- Current: Jorge Viladoms, pianist
- 1950s: Herbert von Karajan
- 2005–2010: David Bruchez, trombone
- Pierre Amoyal (born 1949), violinist
- Current: Jean-François Antonioli (born 1959), pianist, head of piano department †
- Marçal Cervera (de) (born 1928), cellist
- Guy Fallot (born 1927), cellist
- 1949: Paul Kletzki (1900–1973), conductor
- Alfred Cortot (1877–1962), conductor and pianist (taught several master classes after WWII)
- Muriel Rochat Rienth Muriel Rochat Rienth (born 1971), recorder (teaches in Fribourg)
- André de Ribaupierre André de Ribaupierre (1893–1955), violinist
- Edmond Appia (fr) (1994–1961), violinist, conductor

=== HEMU alumni ===
- Jean-François Antonioli (born 1959), pianist (diploma and 1st Prize in 1977)
- Constantin Brăiloiu (1893–1958), composer and ethnomusicologist
- Brice Catherin (born 1981), cellist
- Caroline Charrière (1960–2018), composer, flautist
- Charles Dutoit (born 1936), conductor (studied with Herbert von Karajan in 1955)
- Guy Fallot (fr) (1927–2018), cellist (studied at the Conservatory from 1934 to 1938; earning 1st Prize in 1938) †
- Rudolph Ganz (1877–1972), composer and conductor
- Eduardo Hubert, pianist
- Fabio Maffei (fr) (born 1968), pianist and composer
- Boris Mersson (de) (1921–2013), pianist and composer
- Patrick Moraz (born 1948) (student before 1968), rock keyboardist with Yes and Moody Blues
- Pat Nye (1908–1994), studied music, but became an actress
- Tedi Papavrami (born 1971), violinist (graduated 1987)
- Joseph Payne (1937–2008), organist, harpsichordist
- Brigitte Ravenel (born 1963), mezzo-soprano
- Louis Schwizgebel-Wang (born 1987), pianist
- Jorge Uliarte (born 1962), conductor
- Marcello Viotti (1954–2005), cellist, pianist, conductor
- Martin Wendel (born 1925), composer, flutist, pedagog
- Julien-François Zbinden (1917–2021), pioneer jazz pianist (1938), composer

Note: † signifies alumni and faculty

== Selected discography ==
- Inauguration du Conservatoire de Lausanne du, VDE-Gallo 630 (CD) (1990); OCLC 427853451, 715358029
1. Bach: "Erschallet, ihr Lieder, erklinget, ihr Saiten!" — Video on YouTube
2. Perrin: "Cantosenhal" — Video on YouTube
3. François Thury: "Mata-Hari" — Video on YouTube
4. Alexandra Cservený: "Les animaux chanteurs de Breme" — Video on YouTube
5. Gaudibert: "Feuillages" — Video on YouTube

Lena Hauser, soprano; Stephan Imboden, bass; Miguel Fernandez, narrator; Stéphane Borel, Maxime Favrod (fr), Jacques Hostettler, percussion
Lausanne Conservatory Chorus & Orchestra, Hervé Klopfenstein (fr), conductor
Tracks 3 and 5 are studio recordings; 1, 2, and 4 were recorded live on 5 April 1990

== Selected videos ==
- HEMU promotional video

== Publications ==
- Chronique du Conservatoire de Lausanne et institut de musique (journal); OCLC 714994011
- Règlement général de l'Institut de musique de Lausanne, 2nd ed. (1861); OCLC 717865870
- 25e anniversaire de fondation de l'Institut de musique de Lausanne: 1861–1886 — statistique et catalogue des élèves (1886); OCLC 716592061
- Conservatoire de Lausanne, Institut de musique: Jubilé cinquantenaire 1861–1911 — Notice historique (1911); OCLC 604598936
- 150 Ans en Quelques Dates: Haute Ecole de Musique et Conservatoire de Lausanne

== See also ==
- Orchestre symphonique et universitaire de Lausanne (fr)
