= Payne v. City of Charlottesville =

Lawsuit opposing the removal of Confederate monuments and memorials

- Court: Charlottesville Circuit Court - Civil Division

Payne v. City of Charlottesville is a 2017 lawsuit opposing the removal of Confederate monuments and memorials in Charlottesville, Virginia.

The plaintiffs filed the original complaint on March 20, 2017.

In May 2017 the judge stated that the statues would not be moved before November 2017 at the soonest.

In June 2018 the judge ruled that the city counselors would not have personal legal immunity for certain errors they could have made in their response to the lawsuit.

== Proposed removal ==
In an open-air press conference beside the Robert E. Lee statue in March 2016, Charlottesville's vice mayor Wes Bellamy called on Charlottesville City Council to remove the statue and rename Lee Park. He said that the statue's presence "disrespected" parts of the community, and that he had "spoken with several different people who have said they have refused to step foot [sic] in to that park because of what that statue and the name of that park represents. And we can't have that in the city of Charlottesville"

Local NAACP head Rick Turner spoke in support of removal, calling Lee a "terrorist". Others accused the city council and Bellamy of disregarding Lee's historical significance and how important he was to Virginia, of sowing division, and of trying to rewrite history. A petition to remove the statue was initiated, with wording saying the statue represented "hate" and was a "subliminal message of racism".

In April 2016, the city council decided to appoint a special commission, named the Blue Ribbon Commission on Race, Monuments and Public Spaces, to recommend to city officials how to best handle issues surrounding statues of Stonewall Jackson (Thomas Jonathan Jackson) in Court Square and Lee in Lee Park, as well as other landmarks and monuments. Early in November 2016, the Blue Ribbon Commission voted 6–3 to let both statues remain in place. On November 28, 2016, it voted 7–2 to remove the Lee statue to McIntire Park in Charlottesville and 8–1 to keep the Jackson statue in place, delivering a final report with that recommendation to Charlottesville City Council in December.

On February 6, 2017, Charlottesville's five-member city council voted three votes to two to remove the Lee statue and, unanimously, to rename Lee Park.

In response, a lawsuit was filed on March 20 by numerous plaintiffs, including the Monument Fund Inc, the Sons of Confederate Veterans, and descendants of the statue's donor and sculptor, to block the removal of the Lee and Jackson statues. The lawsuit sought a temporary injunction to halt the removal, arguing that Charlottesville City Council's decision violated a state law designed to protect American Civil War monuments and memorials, and that the council had additionally violated the terms of McIntire's gift to Charlottesville of the statue and the land for Lee Park. The city responded by asking that the temporary injunction be denied, arguing that the two statues were not erected to commemorate the Civil War and therefore the Virginia statute protecting war monuments does not apply.

In April 2017, the city council voted three to two (exactly along the lines of the February vote) that the statue be removed completely from Charlottesville and sold to whoever the Council chooses.

On May 2, 2017, Judge Richard Moore issued a temporary injunction blocking the removal of the Robert E. Lee statue for six months, in the public's interest, pending a court decision in the suit.

Sometime overnight between Friday July 7 and Saturday July 8, the statue was vandalized by being daubed in red paint. It had been vandalized before; in June 2016 the pedestal was spray painted with the words "Black Lives Matter".

== Shrouding ==
On August 20, 2017, the city council unanimously voted to shroud the statue, and that of Stonewall Jackson, in black. The Council "also decided to direct the city manager to take an administrative step that would make it easier to eventually remove the Jackson statue." The statues were covered in black shrouds on August 23, 2017. The tarp was removed in February 2018 by order of a judge.
