= Jean-François Antonioli =

Swiss pianist, conductor and piano pedagogue

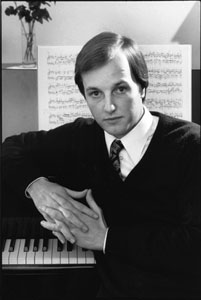
Jean-François Antonioli

Jean-François Antonioli (b. Lausanne, 25 February 1959) is a Swiss pianist, conductor and piano pedagogue.

== Biography ==
Studied piano at Conservatoire de Lausanne under Argentinian pianist Fausto Zadra and later at the Conservatoire de Paris with Pierre Sancan, also working as his assistant. Further studies include those with Bruno Seidlhofer in Vienna and Carlo Zecchi in Rome.

Performed solo or with orchestra in many musical centres in Europe, North America and Asia. He took part in international music festivals such as Montreux-Vevey, Lucerne, Bad Ragaz, Radio-France in Montpellier, Jeunesse Festival at the Vienna Konzerthaus, The Merano Festival in Italy, Dubrovnik Summer Festival, Pecs Napok in Hungary, Enescu and Lipatti in Bucharest, Lanaudičre in Montréal, Québec Festival d'Eté, Birmingham Festival of Arts, Wolf Trap in Washington and others.

He has recorded more than 20 CDs. His most famous recordings are those of Debussy's 24 Preludes, works of Ferruccio Busoni, Joachim Raff and Arthur Honegger. For the recording of Frank Martin's works for piano and orchestra, he was awarded the French "Grand Prix International du Disque de l'Académie Charles Cros" in Paris in 1986.

From 1993 to 2002, he was the Principal Guest Conductor of the Timișoara Philharmonic Orchestra in Romania, with which he toured many European countries. He specialised in the performance of complete Mozart Piano Concertos, combining conducting and playing the solo part at the same time. His orchestral recordings are highly appreciated, awarded and praised by critics worldwide. They include Concertos by Mozart and works of Jean Perrin, Carl Maria von Weber, Ferruccio Busoni, Arthur Honegger and Jean Cras.

As a pianist and conductor, he premiered many important works of contemporary composers. He has been a juror at several major international piano competitions and regularly teaches masterclasses for young pianists. He is a full-time professor at the Conservatoire de Lausanne – Haute Ecole de Musique, where he holds the position of the Head of the Piano department.
