= Bărăgan deportations =

Forced internal relocation in communist Romania, 1951–1956

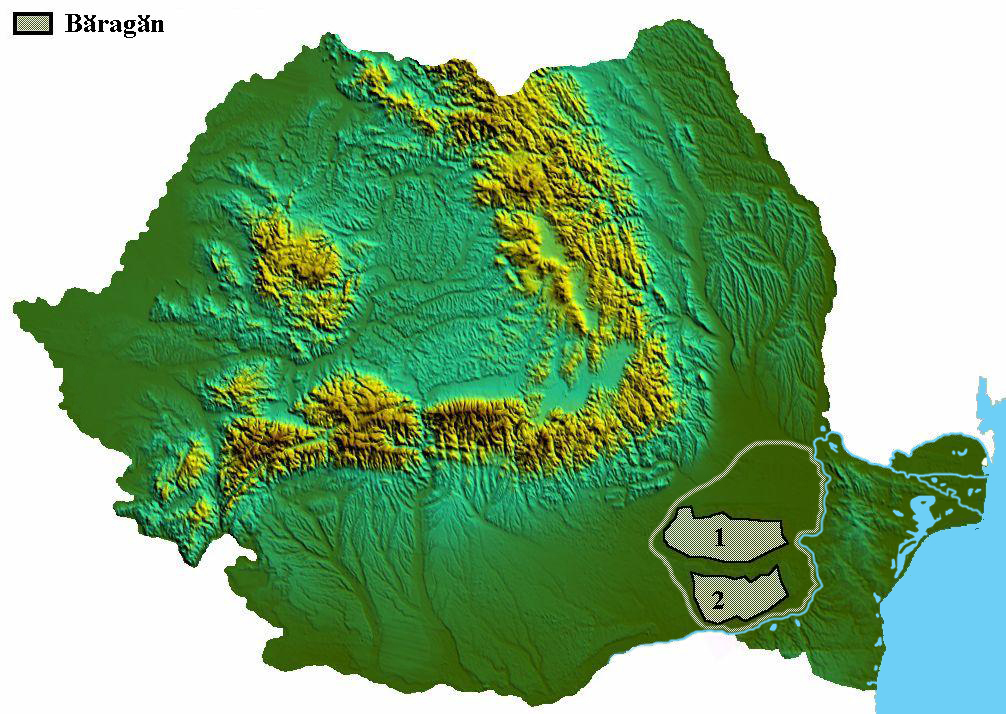
The Bărăgan Plain within Romania

The Bărăgan deportations (Romanian: Deportările în Bărăgan) were a forced internal relocation of civilians carried out by the communist regime of Romania between 1951 and 1956. On the night of 17–18 June 1951, immediately after Orthodox Pentecost Sunday, the authorities removed 12,791 families, numbering 40,320 people according to Interior Ministry records and about 44,000 according to other accounts, from a strip of territory about 25 km (15 mi) deep along the Yugoslav border, corresponding to present-day Timiș, Caraș-Severin and Mehedinți counties, and resettled them in eighteen new villages that the deportees were made to build themselves on the Bărăgan Plain. The operation followed the Tito–Stalin split of 1948 and was designed to clear the frontier zone of populations the regime classified as politically unreliable. Restrictions on the deportees were lifted in stages beginning in December 1955; most returned home in 1956, though confiscated homes were in most cases never recovered. The action was the third-largest mass deportation in twentieth-century Romanian history, after the wartime deportation of Romanian Jews to Transnistria and the January 1945 deportation of approximately 70,000 ethnic Germans to the Soviet Union. It targeted a politically and ethnically heterogeneous population of the Banat and southwestern Oltenia that included Romanians, Banat Swabian Germans, Serbs, Banat Bulgarians, Aromanian, refugees from Bessarabia and northern Bukovina, and a range of socio-economic categories such as wealthy peasants (chiaburi, the Romanian equivalent of kulaks), former officers, and individuals suspected of sympathy with Tito.

== Background ==
=== The Tito–Stalin split and the border zone ===
On 28 June 1948 the Cominform resolution expelled the Communist Party of Yugoslavia, opening the so-called Informbiro period of confrontation between Stalin-aligned states and Josip Broz Tito's Yugoslavia. The Romanian–Yugoslav frontier, which ran through ethnically mixed Banat, became a securitized zone, and the population living adjacent to it came to be regarded by Bucharest as a reservoir of potential cross-border sympathy and "Titoist heresy". An initial plan for the evacuation of "dangerous elements" from a 25 km strip along the border was drafted on 14 November 1950; it envisaged dispersing the deportees across several regions of the country, and the Bărăgan was selected as the destination only later.

=== Earlier mass deportations ===
The June 1951 action was the second mass deportation carried out on Romanian territory after the overthrow of Ion Antonescu. In January 1945, on Soviet orders, ethnic Germans from Romania (men aged 17–45 and women aged 18–30) had been deported to forced labour in the Soviet Union; estimates of their number range from about 70,000 to over 90,000. Between 10,000 and 20,000 of them are estimated to have died in the camps, and the survivors were released gradually, most between 1947 and 1949 and the last only in the early 1950s.

== Legal framework ==
The legal basis for the 1951 action was Council of Ministers decision H.C.M. no. 1,154 of 26 October 1950, as amended on the proposal of Interior Minister Teohari Georgescu by H.C.M. no. 344 of 15 March 1951, which authorised the Ministry of Internal Affairs to remove and assign obligatory residence (domiciliu obligatoriu) to broad categories of persons. The amended article read:

The Ministry of Internal Affairs may, by decision, order the removal from crowded centres of any persons whose presence in those centres is unjustified, as well as the removal from any locality of those who, through their conduct towards the working people, harm the construction of socialism in the Romanian People's Republic. Obligatory residence may be established for the persons concerned in any locality.

On this basis the ministry issued the classified M.A.I. Decision no. 200/1951, the operational order that defined the categories to be removed from the frontier zone and that was read out to the affected families on the night of the deportation. A further secret government decision, H.C.M. no. 326/S of 1951, contained instructions on the establishment of the new settlements for the deported families. The operation was modelled on Soviet practices of internal exile and category-based deportation.

== Targeted categories ==
A strictly secret directive divided those to be removed from the 25 km frontier strip into three groups: citizens of "imperialist" states and of Yugoslavia together with purged officials and cashiered officers not native to the zone; a second, much larger category comprising refugees from Bessarabia, "Macedonian" (Aromanian) refugees, former members of German SS units, Titoists, smugglers and border guides, relatives of persons who had fled abroad, supporters of the armed resistance, wealthy peasants and innkeepers, former merchants with foreign ties, industrialists and landowners; and a third category of former common-law convicts guilty of serious offences. Internal statistics reproduced in the study coordinated by Silviu Sarafolean for the deportees' association give the following breakdown of the 40,320 persons targeted under the operation:

Category	Persons
Wealthy peasants (chiaburi) and innkeepers	19,034
Refugees from Bessarabia	8,447
Refugees from the Macedonia region (mainly Aromanians)	3,557
Persons who had served in German military units during the war	2,344
Foreign nationals	1,330
Relatives of persons who had fled abroad	1,218
Persons classified as "Titoist sympathisers"	1,054
"Enemies of the socialist regime"	731
Persons resident outside the frontier zone	590
Persons who had aided the anti-communist resistance	367
Convicted common-law criminals	341
Germans (separately listed)	257
Former landowners and industrialists	162

The deportees formed an ethnic cross-section of the border zone. Banat and Oltenian Romanians made up the largest group; Germans (Banat Swabians), some of them only recently returned from Soviet labour camps, accounted for about a quarter of the total; refugees from Bessarabia and northern Bukovina for roughly a fifth; and the remainder included Serbs, Banat Bulgarians, Aromanian and Macedo-Romanian refugees, Hungarians and others.

== Operation ==
The operation was launched in the night of 17 to 18 June 1951, one day after the Pentecost Sunday in the Orthodox calendar. The frontier zone, stretching from Beba Veche in Timiș County to Gruia in Mehedinți County, contained 203 localities (Note: The figure of 203 localities is given by IICCMER and by the historians Mircea Rusnac and Liubomir Stepanov. Other accounts give 258 or 297 localities.) and was divided for the operation into twelve raioane (districts), seven in Banat (Sânnicolau Mare, Timișoara, Deta, Reșița, Oravița, Moldova Nouă and Almăj) and five in Oltenia (Turnu Severin, Strehaia, Baia de Aramă, Vânju Mare and Plenița). The number of troops participating in the operation is estimated between 11,000 and 20,000 and included border guards who sealed the frontier, as well as troops and officers of the Interior Ministry, Securitate units, border guards, Militia and firefighters, who carried out the round-up. The operation was coordinated by the Ministry of Internal Affairs under Teohari Georgescu and directed by a central commission composed of deputy ministers Alexandru Drăghici and Marin Jianu, generals Mihail Burcă and Vladimir Mazuru, and Militia commander Pavel Cristescu, with Drăghici supervising the action from Timișoara. Affected families were woken during the night and generally given between two and four hours to gather portable possessions before being taken to railheads, where each family was allotted part or all of a freight wagon. According to Interior Ministry figures, 2,656 railway wagons and 6,211 trucks were used to move the deportees eastwards; the journeys in the cattle wagons lasted up to two weeks. Goods left behind were to be inventoried and bought up by state commissions at derisory prices, but the commissions arrived late or not at all in many localities, and many deportees were never paid.

== Settlements in Bărăgan ==
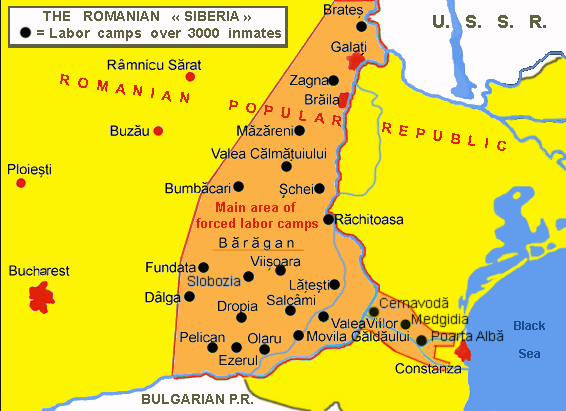
Area of labor camps

Eighteen new villages were laid out on previously uncultivated steppe land in the Ialomița and Galați regions, in the districts of Călărași, Brăila, Călmățui, Galați, Slobozia, Lehliu and Fetești. The deportees were set down in open fields, on plots marked out with numbered stakes, and ordered to build their own houses of adobe and earth: Brateș, Bumbăcari, Dâlga, Dropia, Ezerul, Fundata, Lătești, Măzăreni, Movila Gâldăului, Olaru, Pelican, Răchitoasa, Rubla, Salcâmi, Schei, Valea Viilor, Viișoara and Zagna. To explain the settlers' isolation, the Securitate spread the rumour among the surrounding population that the newcomers were Korean refugees. Movement was restricted to a radius of 15 km around each village and required prior authorisation by the local Militia; the deportees worked on neighbouring state and collective farms and on irrigation and construction sites, under constant surveillance and among informers recruited by the Securitate from their own ranks. Living conditions, especially in the first winters, were severe: shelter was improvised, drinking water scarce and often contaminated, and medical care minimal, with typhoid fever, hepatitis and dysentery among the recorded diseases. A nominal register compiled by the Sighet Memorial's researchers documents 1,688 deportees who died during the period of forced residence, including 175 children, of whom about 150 died before reaching the age of one; the oldest victim had been deported at the age of ninety-five. A narrower count of 629 deaths in the Banat-origin cohort has been used in some studies of counterinsurgency administration.

== Return and rehabilitation ==
The death of Stalin in 1953 and the subsequent easing of repression in the Eastern Bloc led to the gradual lifting of restrictions. A Council of Ministers decision of December 1955 rescinded the residence orders for the majority of persons deported under Decision no. 200/1951, and most deportees left the Bărăgan settlements during 1956. Confiscated houses were in most cases not returned. After 1956 the villages built by the deportees were used as places of obligatory residence for released political prisoners regarded as insufficiently "re-educated"; after the general amnesty of 1964 the houses were demolished and the land ploughed over. The regime did not publicly acknowledge the deportations until 1972, when Nicolae Ceaușescu described them as "mistaken measures" that had damaged the party's national policy. After the Romanian Revolution of 1989, Decree-Law no. 118 of 30 March 1990 recognised persons subjected to deportation and obligatory residence as victims of political persecution and granted them a monthly indemnity for each year of forced residence, together with healthcare and pension entitlements; the law was repeatedly amended in subsequent decades.

== Commemoration and memory ==
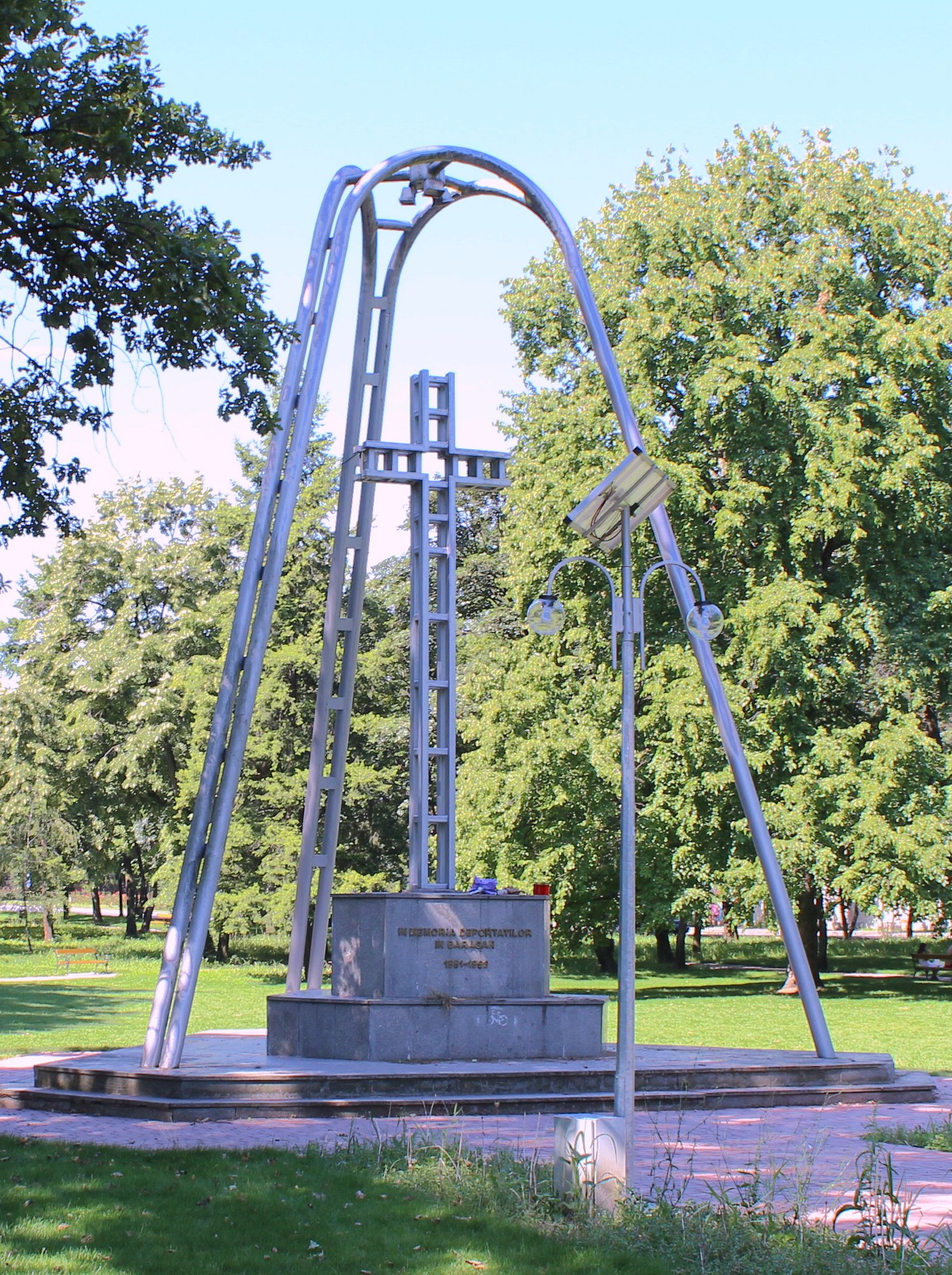
Memorial to the Bărăgan deportees in Justice Park, Timișoara

The Association of Former Bărăgan Deportees (Asociația Foștilor Deportați în Bărăgan), founded in Timișoara in 1990, has published documentation, archived records and testimony, and organised annual commemorations of the deportation. In 1996, on the forty-fifth anniversary of the operation, the association erected the Deportation Monument in Justice Park in Timișoara, and it later built a replica of a deportee's rammed-earth house in the Banat Village Museum. The Sighet Memorial of the Victims of Communism and of the Resistance dedicates Room 47 of its permanent exhibition to the deportation, displaying photographs and objects donated by the association. By Law no. 125 of 10 July 2020, 18 June is observed in Romania as the Day of the Victims of Deportation during the Communist Regime; it was first marked in 2021. The deportation has been the subject of sustained scholarship in Romania and in the diaspora communities most affected, beginning with the oral history programme conducted in the 1990s by Smaranda Vultur and the Timișoara oral history group. Documentary work in Banat Swabian memory has been led by the Haus des Deutschen Ostens in Munich, whose fiftieth-anniversary volume gathered survivor testimony, photographs and archival material. Survivor interviews are also collected in the digital archive Biblioteca Memoriei (deportatiinbaragan.ro), and recent geographical scholarship has drawn on them to examine how the "wounded" memory of the deportations grounds present-day claims for social justice at the former Bărăgan sites. Studies of everyday life under deportation have analysed the regime's control of work, schooling and family life in the new villages and the deportees' strategies of resistance.

== Subsequent events ==
Following the death of Joseph Stalin in March 1953 and the subsequent Yugoslav–Soviet rapprochement, the Romanian government gradually reversed the anti-Yugoslav policies that had helped create the immediate geopolitical context for the deportations. Romania and Yugoslavia resumed diplomatic relations on 19 June 1954, and communications between the two countries reopened that August. The two governments exchanged ambassadors, took steps to restore trade and concluded agreements concerning border incidents, customs, border crossings, cultural exchanges, postal services and rail, air and Danube transport. The Romanian authorities also ended the activities of the Romanian-based Union of Yugoslav Patriots, reduced hostile propaganda against Yugoslavia, permitted deported inhabitants of the frontier region, particularly members of the Serbian minority, to return and released people convicted in connection with the anti-Titoist campaign after 1948.

The compulsory-residence restrictions imposed on most of the original Bărăgan deportees were lifted in December 1955, and most returned to their former localities during 1956. Their property claims were regulated through several measures. Council of Ministers Decision no. 2694 of 7 December 1955 applied to ethnic Serbian families displaced from the Timișoara region, while Decision no. 29 of 1955 and Decision no. 623 of 1956 covered displaced families of other nationalities. The measures provided for the restitution of houses and other property or, where restitution was impossible, limited compensation and special credit for replacement housing. Implementation was nevertheless uneven: some houses had been destroyed, occupied by state or collective institutions or allocated to other residents, and some returning families received a different house rather than the one they had lost. For the Serbian cohort from the Timișoara region, 588 of the 661 confiscated houses were returned in full and 25 were returned only partially. Survivor accounts describe returnees finding their former homes occupied, damaged, stripped of building materials or otherwise uninhabitable. Some families could not afford the return journey, while refugees originally displaced from Bessarabia and Northern Bukovina and others who no longer had homes in western Romania remained in the Bărăgan settlements.

The political reconciliation was consolidated during Josip Broz Tito's official visit to Romania from 23 to 26 June 1956. At the railway station in Timișoara, Tito told members of the Serbian minority that their situation had met with understanding from the Romanian leadership and urged them not to allow their friendship with Yugoslavia to undermine their loyalty to Romania. His remarks publicly connected the treatment of the Serbian minority with the restoration of Romanian–Yugoslav friendship.

The return of the original deportees did not immediately end the use of the Bărăgan as a location of internal exile. Beginning in 1956, some of the purpose-built settlements were used to accommodate former political prisoners who had completed their prison sentences but were subsequently assigned to domiciliu obligatoriu (“compulsory domicile”). This practice continued until the releases of 1964. Beginning in 1958, the authorities ordered several of the deportee settlements to be merged with neighbouring communes or dismantled, and most had been demolished by the end of the 1960s. Fundata, Dâlga and Valea Călmățuiului, also known as Rubla, were among the settlements that survived in some form. In 1967, Ceaușescu publicly characterized the earlier deportation of Romanian citizens as illegal and unconstitutional, after which compulsory-domicile designations ceased to appear in identity documents. This condemnation occurred more than a decade after most of the original deportees had been permitted to return.

Public discussion of the deportations remained restricted during the communist period. Only after the Romanian Revolution of 1989 did the Bărăgan deportations become the subject of sustained historical research and public memorialization. Published survivor testimonies, oral-history projects, local monuments, archival research and digital-history initiatives subsequently brought the experiences of the deportees into wider Romanian scholarship and public memory.

== See also ==
- Forced settlements in the Soviet Union
- Hortobágy labor camps
- Goli Otok
