= Brigitte Ravenel =

Brigitte Ravenel is a mezzo-soprano singer based in Nyon, Switzerland.

== Biography ==
Ravenel was born in Nyon in 1963. A lyrical artist with a mezzo-soprano range, she leads an independent career, and performs across Europe, either as a soloist or part of the Radio Suisse ensemble, accompanied by the orchestra I Barocchisti, under the leadership of Diego Fasolis. The precision of her intonation and vocal power allows a varied repertoire: traditional orchestral works by Giovanni Battista Pergolesi, Francesco Cavalli, Antonio Vivaldi, Giacomo Carissimi, Henry Purcell, as well as the masterpieces of Johann Sebastian Bach, and numerous other cantatas. She sings songs by Brahms, Schumann, Mahler, Wolf, and others, as well as tunes by Debussy, Honegger, Poulenc, Barber, De Falla, Weill, F. Martin and numerous other contemporary Swiss composers, such as J-P Lavanchy, J-F Bovard, M. Hostetteler and Thüring Bräm, as well as Betty Roe and Sofia Goubaïdoulina.

Trained at the Conservatoire de Lausanne, in the same class as Philippe Huttenlocher, she studied under a range of notable professors, including F. Cavalli in Milan and Maarten Koningsberger in Amsterdam. Her meetings with Christa Ludwig and Armin Jordan were decisive in setting out her career.

Brigitte Ravenel has performed at numerous national and international festivals, such as the Festival international de musiques sacrées in Fribourg (CH), La Bâtie-Festival de Genève (CH), La Folia – Festival de musique ancienne in Rougemont (CH), the Festival de musique de La Chaise-Dieu (FR), the Festival international Jean-Sébastien Bach de Saint-Donat-sur-l'Herbasse (FR), the Settimana musicale in Turin (IT), La Sagra Malatestiana in Rimini (IT), the festival de Musique ancienne in Bruges (BE), as well as in Utrecht (NL).

She has also initiated the creation of musical cultural exhibitions. Notably, she founded and organised the annual events Pleine Lune en Duo and Les Intimes à Nyon, where different styles and musical universes mix and there is a range of musical interpretation, talks, and video projection.

== Discography ==
- Arthur Honegger - Mélodies et pièces pour clavier 1915 – 1923 (2003);
- Arthur Honegger - Mélodies et pièces pour clavier 1939 – 1946 (2005);
- Kurt Weill – Les Inédits avec le quatuor «Dites-le-moi Tuba» (2007);
- Popolémoi – 8 duos pour contrebasse et voix de mezzo-soprano (2010);
- Cinq chansons noires - 5 duos pour voix et instrument de Thüring Bräm sur des textes d'Aloïse (2011);
- Le Chant d’Amour et de Mort du Cornette Christoph Rilke de Rainer Maria Rilke, musique de Frank Martin, première version mondiale pour chant et piano, avec le pianiste Francesco Libetta (2012)

== Sources and references ==
- Article in the Tribune de Genève, 8 July 2011
- Le Temps, 29 March 2007
- Journal La Côte
- Radio Télévision Suisse, 14 July 2011
