= Jorge Uliarte =

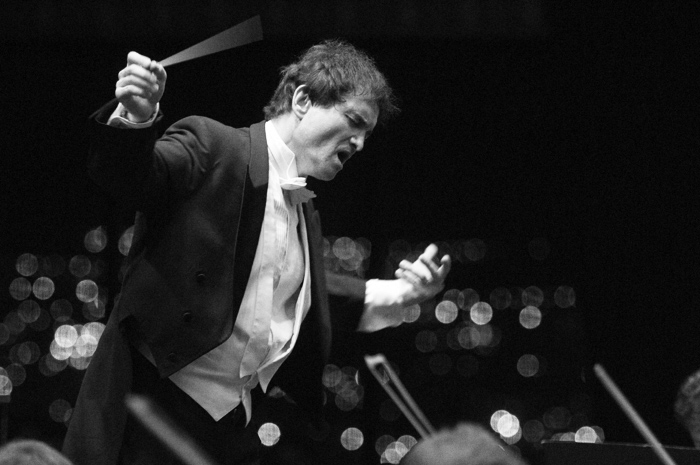
Jorge Uliarte en Ushuaia - Facundo Santana

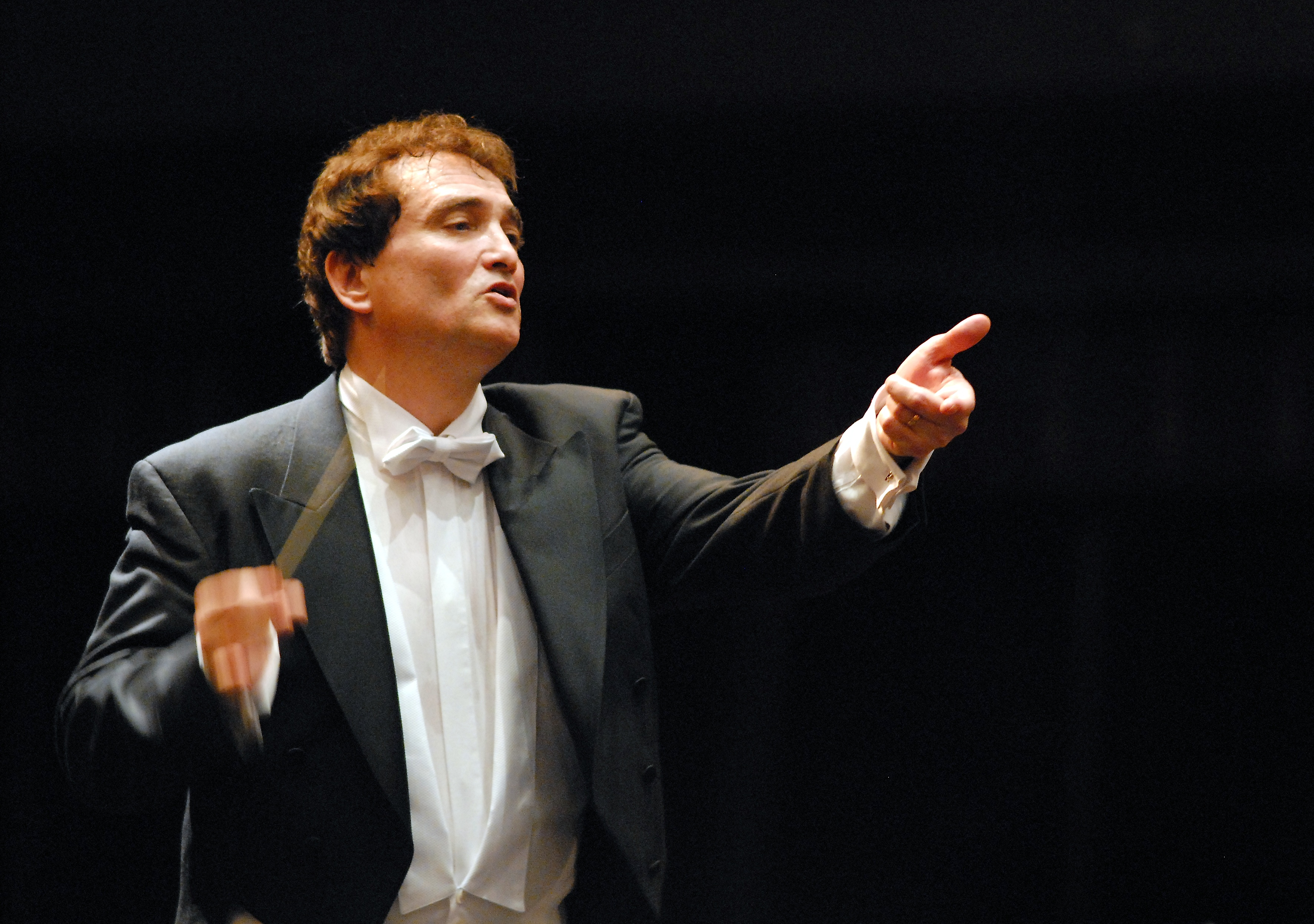
Jorge Uliarte, 2007

Jorge Uliarte is an Argentinian conductor and is principally known as the artistic director of the International Festival of Ushuaia in Tierra del Fuego, Argentina. In 2011 he began a sister festival in Orvieto, Italy.

Uliarte was born in Cordoba, Argentina. He attended the Music Conservatory in Córdoba, Buenos Aires, Lausanne, Santa Cecilia, Rome and Belgium. Uliarte received the diploma in orchestral conducting at the University of Concepcion and completed the "Post-graduate Fellowship" as a conductor at the university of the Royal College of Music, Manchester.

At 16 he debuted as a pianist at the Teatro Colón, Buenos Aires. He won the international Ravel-competition of South America. In 1990 he founded the "Pan American Youth Orchestra" which headquarters are in Buenos Aires. With the "Pan American Youth Orchestra" he worked as a conductor as well as a pianist. In London, Sir Georg Solti took notice of Uliarte and invited him to the Salzburg Festival as his assistant.

In 2005 Uliarte has founded the southernmost music festival in the world in Ushuaia, Tierra del Fuego, Argentina. Uliarte is the artistic director of the festival. The festival is held under the auspices of the city and province of Salzburg.

In 2006 Uliarte worked with the "Prague Symphony Orchestra Dvorak". In 2007 with the Berliner Symphoniker which was invited for 10 concerts in Argentina. In 2008 Uliarte founded his own orchestra, under the title "Orquesta Filarmonica de Ushuaia", which played 10 concerts in Argentina. In March 2008, a major highlight of his career took place when Uliarte conducted the Berliner Symphoniker. In November 2008 Uliarte led a tour of five concerts of the orchestra in Argentina, the highlight of the tour was an open-air concert in the center of Buenos Aires - at the obelisk - the city's landmark. This concert was also broadcast on television via satellite, reaching more than 30 million viewers.

In April 2009 Uliarte conducted a total of 10 concerts with the Moscow Symphony Orchestra in Argentina and 7 additional concerts at the International Music Festival of Ushuaia from 25 April to 9 May 2009.

In April and May 2009 Jorge Uliarte conducted 10 concerts with the Moscow Symphony Orchestra in Argentina. More than 20.000 visitors attended the concerts. As the artistic director Uliarte was responsible for a total of 28 concerts during the International Music Festival of Ushuaia. In 2010and 2011 he realized a successful tour with the Moscow Symphony Orchestra through China and Moscow, also in Orvieto/Italy and in 2012 the international music festival in Ushuaia was transmitted for the first time via live-stream on YouTube - worldwide. In 2013 he conducted the Lithuanian National Symphony Orchestra.

In 2017-2019 Jorge Uliarte published 3 books at #Amazon (Spanish language) Title: Ushuaia, capital de Malvinas, relato de mi utopía, Pajaro de füego, una aventura onírica, EN EL ORIENTE DEL ESTE :.: Diario de un musikante

The 3 books are available online or as print-version.
