= Gheorghe Costin =

Romanian conductor and composer

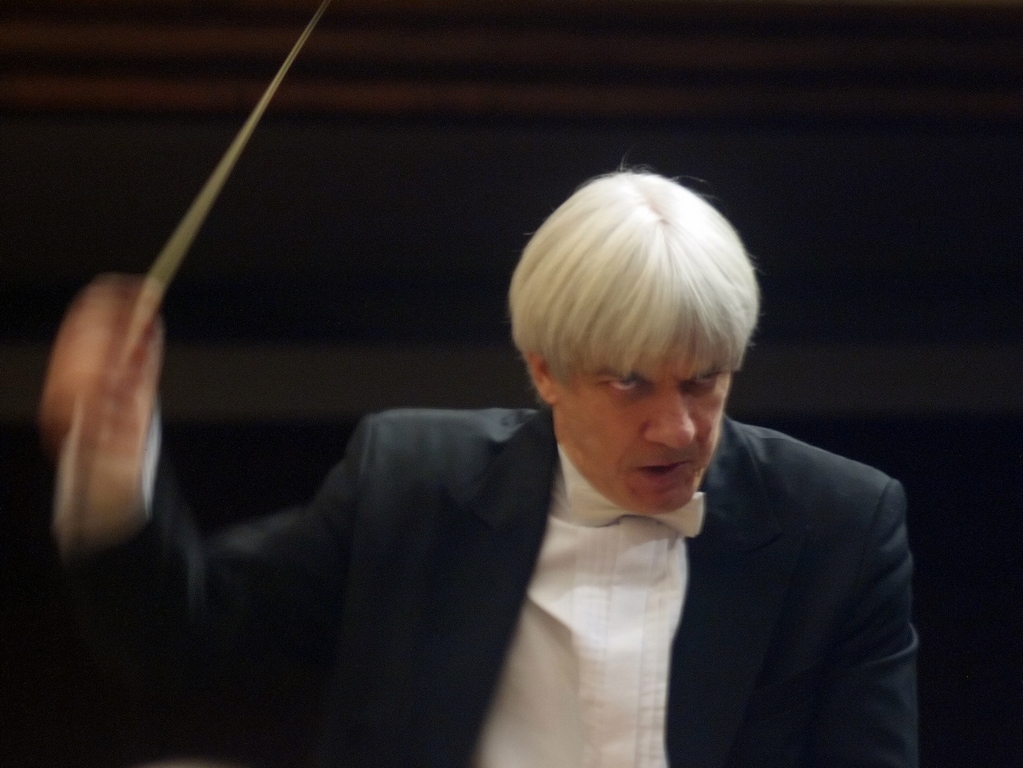
- Born: 1 May 1955 (age 69); Baia Mare, Romania
- Occupations: Conductor; Composer
- Known for: Banatul Philharmonic of Timișoara's Principal Conductor

Gheorghe Costin (born 1 May 1955 in Baia Mare) is a Romanian conductor and composer.

A disciple of Constantin Bugeanu in Bucharest's Music Academy, he spent two years at the head of the Târgu Mureş Philharmonic before he was appointed Principal Conductor of the Iaşi State Philharmonic, where he would remain for thirteen years (1988–2001).

At present, Gheorghe Costin is one of the Banatul Philharmonic of Timișoara conductors. He has been a member of the Romanian Composers' and Musicologists' Union (UCMR) since 1984.
