= Les Élémens (Rebel) =

Baroque period ballet by Jean-Féry Rebel

- simphonie nouvelle
- by Jean-Féry Rebel
- Composed: 1737–1738
- Dedication: Prince of Carignano
- Duration: About 25 minutes
- Movements: 10
- Scoring: Instrumental ensemble

Premiere
- Date: 27 September 1737
- Location: Palais des Tuileries, Paris

Les Élémens, simphonie nouvelle is a ballet of the late Baroque period composed for instrumental ensemble in 1737 and 1738 by Jean-Féry Rebel (1666 – 1747).

== Composition ==
The theme of the ballet was most likely inspired by the opéra-ballet Les élémens, which Rebel conducted in 1721 at the Palais des Tuileries.

The work consists of ten movements.

1. Le cahos (spelling from the engraved score) or chaos
2. Loure I: La terre et l'eau
3. Chaconne: Le feu
4. Ramage: L'air
5. Rossignols
6. Loure II
7. Tambourins I & II
8. Sicilienne
9. Rondeau: Air pour l'Amour
10. Caprice

"Le cahos" or chaos. This 127-bar prologue is an undanced instrumental piece. "Le cahos" is divided into seven parts referring to the seven days of the creation of the world as described in the Genesis creation narrative in the Bible. The first chaos, marked "très lent", begins with a dissonant tone cluster which includes all the notes of the D harmonic minor scale (D, E, F, G, A, B♭, C♯), which is held for two measures by the strings, the bassoon and the harpsichord, in dynamics indicated "fort" (loud) then "doux" (soft, i.e. a decrescendo), followed by a silence. This chord is held in the following bars with rhythmic acceleration of Quarter note, Eighth note, and Sixteenth note, with a high A held by the piccolo at the end of the 3rd measure. Four themes are presented in the second chaos: "l’eau" (water) in the flutes, represented by a descending melodic movement, which then ascends gradually in regular joint values; "l'air" (air) in the piccolos, represented by a high B♭ Trill (music). This occurs at the same time as "le feu" (fire) in the violins, represented by high jerks. The last theme of the second chaos is "la terre" (earth), in the bass instruments, represented in the following measure by long notes. These themes are developed in the following chaoses. The shorter seventh chaos is generally more peaceful, without the harmonic and rhythmic irregularities of previous chaos; it ends with a long Cadence music in D major.

The rest of the symphony comprises dances and pieces of varied instrumentation, from 2 to 5 parts, including horns and oboes, in which the elements are evoked without the harmonic audacity of the introduction.

== Instrumentation ==
The engraved edition is presented as a reduction comprising two parts for violins, two for flutes and a bass, but includes indications allowing richer instrumentation. A score and handwritten separate parts that were probably used in the performance indicate the participation of Bassoon, Hunting horn, Oboe, and a Double bass. Certain passages are played by piccolos. Parts of trumpets and horns are given for the finale (caprice) of the symphony.

This first edition is preceded by an introduction, Warning, in which the composer describes his approach.

"The elements painted in dance and in music seemed to me susceptible of a pleasant variety, as much in relation to the different genres of music as in relation to the dancers. The introduction to this symphony was natural, It was Le cahos even, this confusion which reigned between the Elements before the moment when subjected to invariable laws they took the place which is prescribed to them in the order of nature. To designate, in this confusion, each element in particular I used the most popular conventions. The bass expresses the earth through notes linked together and which are played by jerks. The Flutes, by lines of song, which go up and down, imitate the course and the murmur of the water. The air is painted by outfits followed by cadences that form the small flutes. Finally, the violins, in lively and brilliant lines, represent the activity of fire. These distinctive characters are recognized, separated or confused, in whole or in part, in the various occasions, which I call by the name of Cahos and which mark the efforts which the Elemen make to get rid of each other. In the 7th cahos, these efforts decrease in proportion as the entire resourcefulness approaches. This first idea took me further. I dared to undertake to join to the idea of the confusion of the elements of Harmony. I hazarded to hear first all the sounds mixed together or rather all the notes of the Octave united in a single sound. These notes then develop while going up in Unison in the progression which is natural for them, and, after a Dissonance, one hears the perfect chord. I finally believed that this would make the Cahos of harmony even better, if by walking through the different Cahos on different strings, I could without shocking the ear, make the final tone indecisive, until he returned determined at the time of the final examination."

== Performances ==
The work was performed with dancers on September 27, 1737, without "Le cahos".

"Le chaos" was performed by the Académie Royale de Musique, alone and not danced, on the 17 and 22 March 1738, following sung pieces by other composers. According to the brief report of the Mercure de France of March 1738, the harmonic daring of the composition does not seem to have repelled the audience: "The Académie Royale de Musique gave [...] two performances of the Opera Cadmus with a very large audience; this piece was followed by [...] and by Sr Rebel, the father's Cahos, which is assessed by the greatest connoisseurs to be one of the finest symphony pieces that exist of its genre".

"Le chaos" and excerpts from Les Élémens were again played in a concert in July 1740.

After two centuries of obscurity, the ballet was performed in 1950 at the Théâtre de la Reine with choreography by Serge Lifar by an orchestra conducted by Roger Désormière. Since then, the symphony has been periodically performed in instrumental versions by baroque ensembles and symphony orchestras. A relatively early recording dates from 1974, by the Orchestre Lyrique De L'ORTF conducted by André Jouve.
