= Émile-Robert Blanchet =

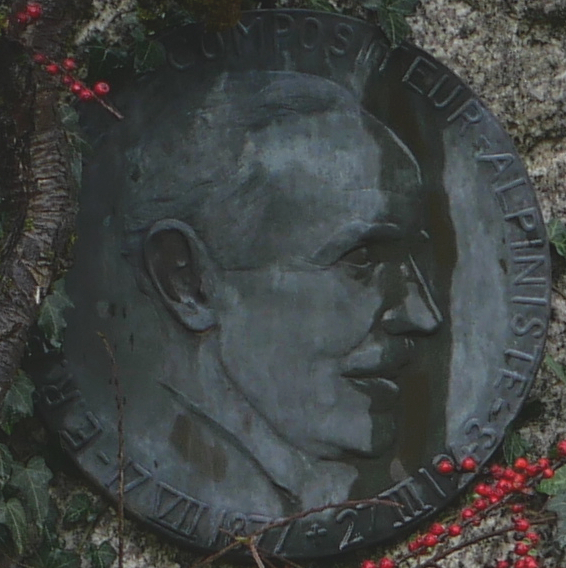
- Medallion on Blanchet's tombstone at the cemetery of Pully.

Émile-Robert Blanchet (17 July 1877 in Lausanne, Switzerland – 27 March 1943 in Pully, Switzerland) was a French-speaking Swiss pianist, composer and mountaineer.

== Life ==
He was taught by his father, Charles Blanchet, the organist of a cathedral in Lausann and a pupil of Ignaz Moscheles, and Hauptmann. He later attended Cologne Conservatory and was a pupil of Busoni in Weimar and Berlin. He was professor of piano 1904-1917, then director 1905-1908 of the Lausanne Conservatory. He continued teaching there until 1917.

In 1917 he resigned and spent time on climbing on which he would write 2 books. He composed a lot of pieces, especially for piano.

== Recordings ==
- On Kaleidoscope Marc-André Hamelin

There is a CD at this address where a piece of his is recorded.

- On Columbia Masterworks Ervin Nyiregyházi, available on YouTube as well.
