= Court Square Park =

Park in Charlottesville, Virginia

- Interactive map of Court Square Park
- Location: Charlottesville, Virginia
- Coordinates: 38°1′54″N 78°28′31″W
- Area: 0.4 acres (0.16 ha)
- Created: 1919
- Operator: City of Charlottesville
- Status: Open all year

Court Square Park (formerly Jackson Park and Justice Park) is a public park in Charlottesville, Virginia.

Court Square Park is 0.4 acres bounded by Jefferson Street, Fourth Street N.E., High Street and the Albemarle County Court Building. Paul Goodloe McIntire established the park in 1919 by donating the land to the city of Charlottesville.

The park was originally named Jackson Park after Confederate general Stonewall Jackson. A statue of Jackson on horseback, Thomas Jonathan Jackson, was placed there in 1921.

In November 2016 the Blue Ribbon Commission on Race, Memorials and Public Spaces published a report recommending transforming the statue into a monument for remembering racial oppression and to change the name from Jackson Park. In June 2017, the city council voted to change the name to Justice Park, and in July 2018, the name was changed again to Court Square Park.

The statue was removed on July 10, 2021.
