= Guy Fallot =

French cellist

Guy Fallot (1927 – 25 July 2018) was a French cellist born in Nancy.

== Biography ==
Guy Fallot's father, Paul Fallot – a geologist and professor at the Collège de France – was also a great music lover and played the violin. The mother of Guy Fallot was a recognized amateur organist and held the organ of the cathedral of Nancy. Guy Fallot naturally began to learn the piano with his mother. She was very close to Guy Ropartz, hence the choice of the first name Guy for his son.

He entered the Lausanne Conservatory at the age of 9, and obtained the virtuosity prize at 14. One year later, with his sister Monique, he won the first prize at the Geneva Sonata Competition. At the Conservatoire de Paris, he obtained the first prize in the class of Paul Bazelaire in 1946.

He taught mainly at the Geneva and Lausanne conservatories, where he trained many pupils.

He pursued an international career, interrupted for some time because of a hand problem, and played all over the world, in sonata with pianist Rita Possa, also his accompanist for his classes at the conservatory. Among his recordings is one from the 1950s of the Dvořák Cello Concerto with the South West German Rundfunk Baden-Baden, conducted by André Jouve on the Ducretet-Thomson label.

Fallot died in Lausanne in 2018, aged 91.
