= Jean Perrin (composer) =

Swiss composer and pianist

Jean Perrin (September 17, 1920 – September 24, 1989) was a Swiss composer and pianist. He composed in a neo-classical style, sometimes approaching polytonality, and his music shows the influence of Stravinsky and Poulenc.

He began studying piano in Lausanne, where he was born, and later studied with Franz-Joseph Hirt in Bern and Edwin Fischer in Lucerne. Eventually he went to Paris to study piano with Yves Nat. In Paris he also studied composition with Nadia Boulanger and Darius Milhaud. After returning to Lausanne he taught piano and also edited program notes for the Lausanne Chamber Orchestra for over 20 years.

He died in his sleep in Lausanne the night before the worldwide broadcast on French-speaking radio of the world premiere of his string quartet.

== List of selected works ==
Perrin wrote over 50 compositions, some of which are listed here:

- Concerto grosso for piano and orchestra, op. 6b (1952)
- Sonatas(1953-6):
  - for horn and piano, op. 7
  - for violin and piano, op. 8
  - for piano, op. 10b
  - for cello and piano, op. 11
  - for flute and piano, op. 12b
- Symphony No. 2, op. 15 (1959)
- Mass for four soloists, chorus, and orchestra, op. 19 (unfinished)
- Piano Quartet, op. 23 (1965)
- Symphony No. 3, op. 24 (1966)
- Drei deutsche Lieder (Bertolt Brecht, A. Goes, G. Politzer) for alto and orchestra (1967-8)
- De profundis for four soloists, chorus, and orchestra, op. 26 (1968–70)
- Concerto for cello and orchestra, op. 27 (1972)
- Introduction and Allegro for trombone and orchestra, op. 30 (1973)
- Canticum laudis for 4 violins, flute, oboe, clarinet, 2 bassoons, trumpet, trombone, and double bass, op. 32 (1974)
- Marche funèbre for orchestra, op. 38 (1978)
- Concerto for piano and orchestra, op. 41 (1978)
- Six préludes for piano, op. 45 (1980–81)
- Concerto for violin and orchestra (1986)
- String Quartet (1988)

== Selected recording ==
- De profundis, Cello Concerto • Timişoara Banatul Philharmonic; Jean-François Antonioli, conductor. (See Timişoara Banatul Philharmonic for recording details.)
- Musique Concertante, Concerto for piano and orchestra, op. 41, Concerto for violin and orchestra, Introcuction and Allegro for trombone and orchestra, Concerto for cello and orchestra • Brigitte Meyer, piano; Tanja Becker-Bender, violin; David Bruchez, Trombone; Emil Rovner, cello; Kammerphilharmonie Potsdam; Jean-François Antonioli, conductor. (DIVOX CDX-20906-6)
- Symphony No. 3, Op. 24; German Lieder, Op. 25; Concerto grosso, Op. 6b; String Quartet; Musikszene CTSP 45.
