= Banatul Philharmonic of Timișoara =

Musical institution in Timișoara, Romania

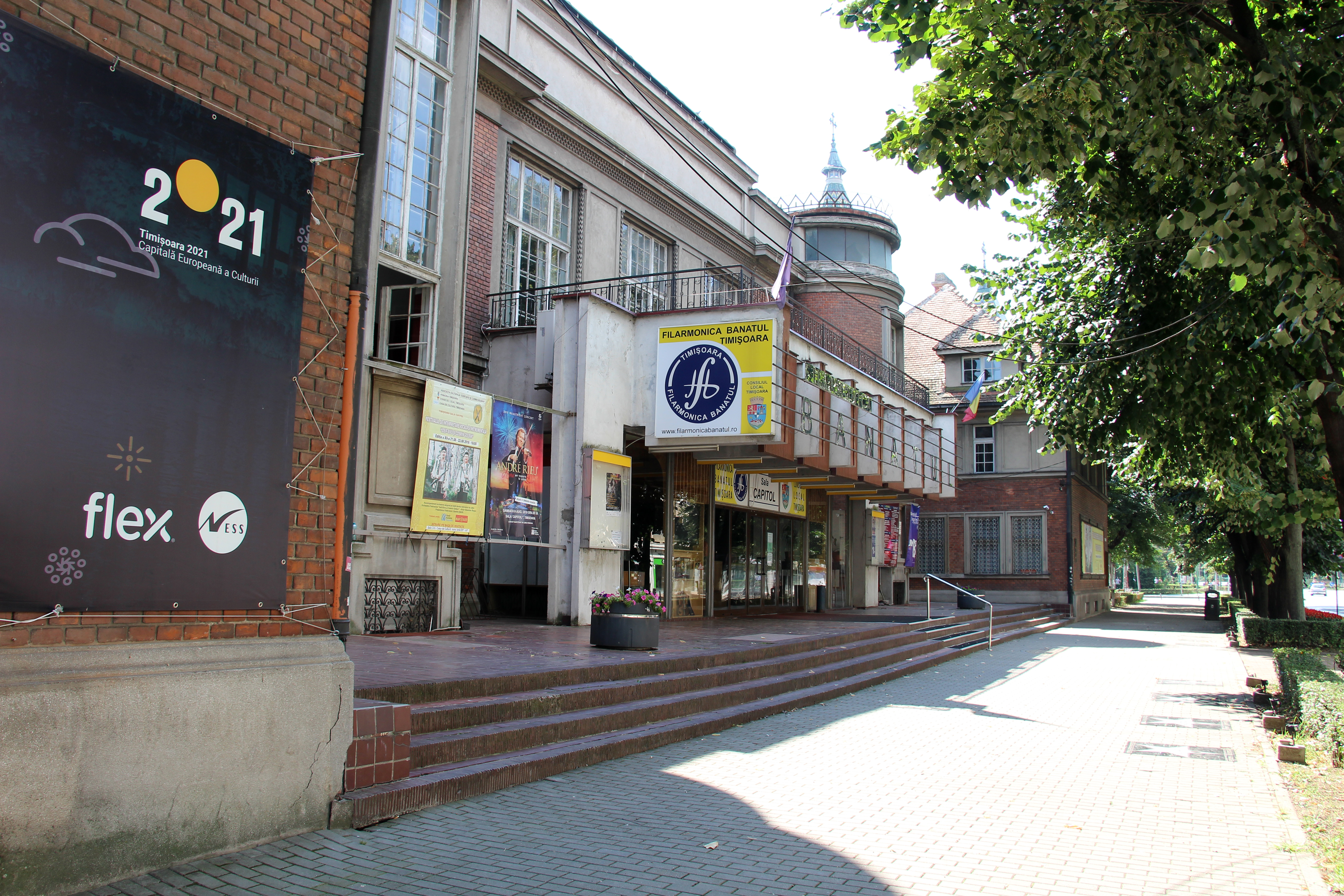
The current headquarters of the Banatul Philharmonic, built in 1929 with municipal funds

The Banatul Philharmonic (Romanian: Filarmonica Banatul) is a musical institution in Timișoara, Romania. Established in 1871, it now comprises a symphony orchestra, professional chorus and various chamber groups. The Banatul Philharmonic operates in the projection hall of the former Capitol cinema, built by the mayor's office in 1929, which was nationalized in 1956, so that in 2007 it would be taken over by the municipality of Timișoara, by a special law.

== History ==
=== 1871–1947 ===
Before having a proper music society, like other cities in the country, in Timișoara there was the choral association Temeswarer Männergesangverein, founded in 1845. It seems that it was the first music society in the city, but did not survive in the context of 1848–1849 events. It was re-established in 1858, and its activity is recorded as meritorious, contributing in various ways to the musical life of the city. The repertoire of this chorale included works of great popularity, belonging mainly to German romantic music.

At one point, the chorus and orchestra disbanded. Therefore, the musical landscape of the city increasingly felt the need to resume similar initiatives. As a result of this desideratum, eleven music-loving enthusiasts met on 21 October 1871 in Auguste Pummer's house, deciding to establish a men's choral society called "Timișoara Philharmonic Society" (German: Temeswarer Philharmonische Verein). The minutes of the first meeting were written at the constituent meeting and a committee consisting of Auguste Pummer, Heinrich Weidt and Franz Wilhelm Speer was elected. On this occasion, the work Die Träne was sung, which later became the motto of the chorus. The inaugural concert took place on the stage of the Communal Theater on 8 December 1871 and was performed with the help of the Timișoara Opera Orchestra and some blowers from the 29th Infantry Regiment. The concert activity that followed was mainly focused (in the beginning) on a cappella and chamber music.

Performers in Timișoara during this period included pianists Béla Bartók and Johannes Brahms; baritone Gheorghe Dima; cellist David Popper; and violinists Leopold Auer, George Enescu, Joseph Joachim, Jan Kubelík, František Ondříček, Pablo de Sarasate and Henryk Wieniawski.

In 1947 the orchestra was renamed the Banatul State Philharmonic, and eventually simply the Banatul Philharmonic. The first symphonic concert took place on 8 June 1947 with Timișoara-born French conductor Charles Bruck and French pianist Monique de La Bruchollerie. The opening of the first season took place on 26 October 1947.

=== Conductors ===
Conductors of the Banatul Philharmonic have included George Pavel (1947), Mircea Popa, Nicolae Boboc, Alexander Šumski, Remus Georgescu, Paul Popescu and Peter Oschanitzky. Gheorghe Costin and Radu Popa are the current permanent conductors. Guest conductors have included Kurt Adler, Roberto Benzi, Anatole Fistoulari, Kiril Kondrashin, Stanisław Wisłocki and Adone Zecchi. Jean-François Antonioli was Principal Guest Conductor from 1993 to 2002.

=== Guest soloists ===
Guest soloists with the orchestra have included pianists Dimitri Bashkirov, Julius Katchen and Rudolf Kehrer; violinists Ivry Gitlis, Gidon Kremer, Yehudi Menuhin, Vladimir Spivakov and Josef Suk; and cellists Miloš Sádlo and Daniil Shafran. Other performers in Timișoara have included pianists Annie Fischer, Artur Rubinstein, Alexandra Vizman and Carlo Zecchi; violinists Bronisław Huberman, Fritz Kreisler, Jacques Thibaud and Eugène Ysaÿe; and cellists Pablo Casals and Gregor Piatigorsky. The orchestra has visited many European countries, including Austria, Bulgaria, France, Germany, Greece, Italy, the Netherlands, Spain, Switzerland and the former Yugoslavia.
