= Jean-Féry Rebel =

French Baroque composer and violinist

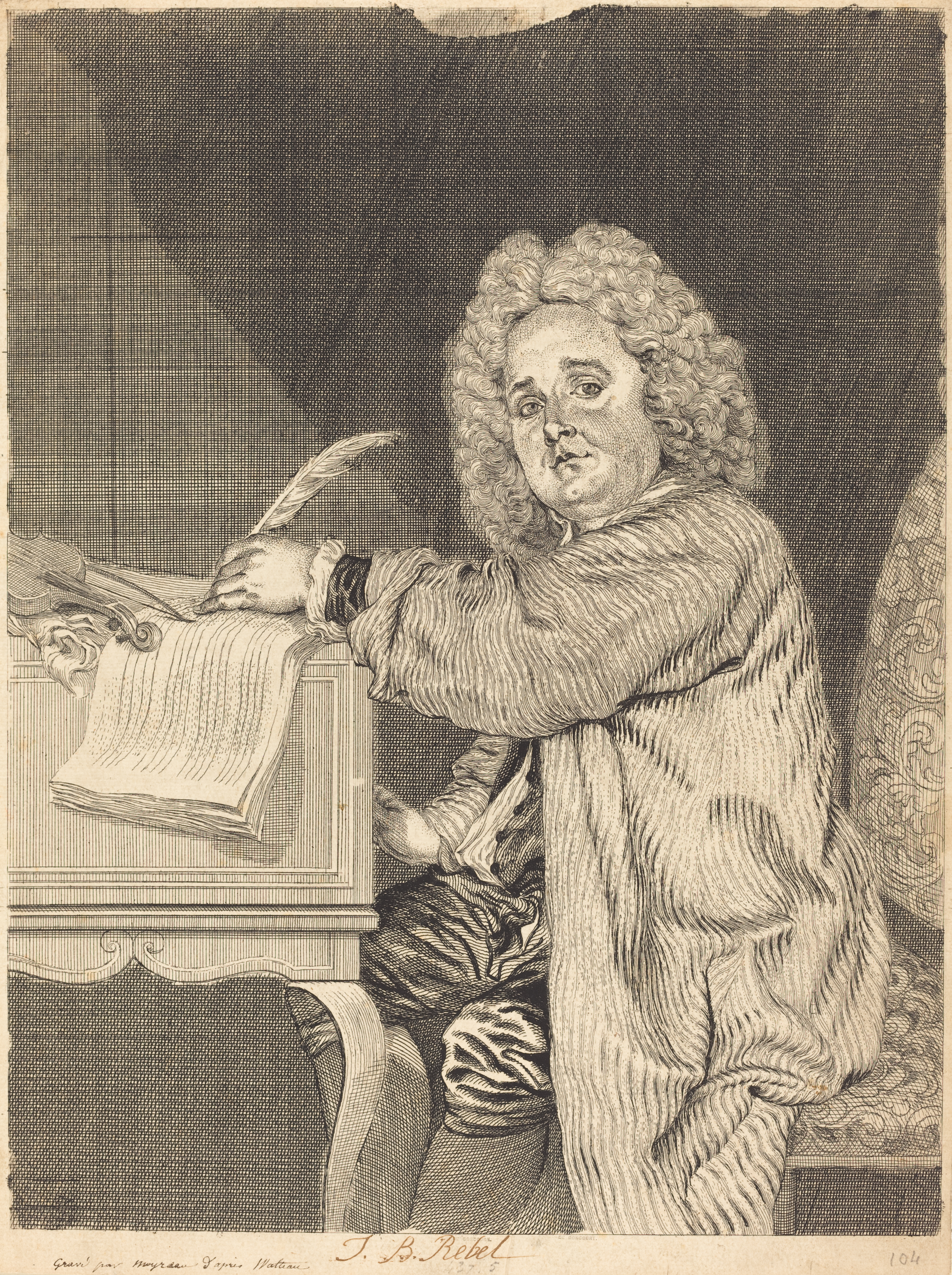
- Portrait print by Jean Moyreau after Antoine Watteau, c. 1730
- Born: 18 April 1666; Kingdom of France
- Died: 2 January 1747 (aged 80); Paris, Kingdom of France
- Era: Baroque

Jean-Féry Rebel (18 April 1666 – 2 January 1747) was an innovative French Baroque composer and violinist.

== Biography ==
Rebel, a child violin prodigy, was the most famous offspring of Jean Rebel, a tenor in Louis XIV's private chapel. He later became a student of notable violinist, singer, conductor, and composer Jean-Baptiste Lully.

By 1699, at age 33, Rebel became first violinist of the Académie royale de musique (also known as the Opéra). He travelled to Spain in 1700. Upon his return to France in 1705, he was given a place in the prestigious ensemble known as the Les Vingt-quatre Violons du Roi. He was chosen Maître de Musique in 1716. His most important position at court was Chamber Composer, receiving the title in 1726. Rebel served as court composer to Louis XIV and maître de musique at the Académie, and directed the Concert Spirituel (during the 1734–1735 season).

Rebel was one of the first French musicians to compose sonatas in the Italian style. Many of his compositions are marked by striking originality that include complex counter-rhythms and audacious harmonies that were not fully appreciated by listeners of his time. His opus Les caractères de la danse combined music with dance, a French tradition, and presented innovative metrical inventions. The work was popular and was performed in London in 1725 under the baton of George Frideric Handel. In honour of his teacher, Rebel composed Le tombeau de M. Lully (literally, "The Tomb of Monsieur Lully"; figuratively, "A Tribute to Lully"). Some of Rebel's compositions are described as choreographed "symphonies." Among his boldest original compositions is Les Élémens ("The Elements") which describes the creation of the world – the beginning, "Le Chaos", is surprisingly modern. The opening dissonant chord of "Le Chaos" is a tone cluster and includes all the notes of the D harmonic minor scale.

His son François Rebel (1701–1775) was also a composer, noted violinist, and member of the "Vingt-quatre violons du roi". He co-wrote and co-directed operas with François Francœur.

The Rebel Baroque Orchestra, formed in 1991, was named in his honour.

== Compositions ==
=== Aria ===
- Receuils d'airs sérieux et à boire, airs for voice (1695–1708)
- Leçons de Ténèbres (Lost)

=== Ballet ===
- Caprice, ballet d'action (ballet-pantomime) (1711)
- Boutade (1712)
- Les Caractères de la danse (1715)
- La Terpsichore (1720)
- Les Plaisirs champêtres (1724)
- Fantaisie (1729)
- Les Élémens (1737)

=== Opera ===
- Ulysse, tragédie lyrique (1703)

=== Trio Sonata ===
- Recueil de douze sonates à 2 ou 3 parties, Book of twelve sonatas in 2 or 3 parts (composed in 1695, published in Paris in 1712)
  - (includes: Le tombeau de M. de Lully, en hommage à son maître)

=== Violin Sonata ===
- 12 Sonates à violon seul mellées de plusieurs récits pour la viole, 12 sonatas for violin solo mixed with récits for viol, (Paris 1713)
