= Gisella Orphanage =

- Orfelinatul Gisella
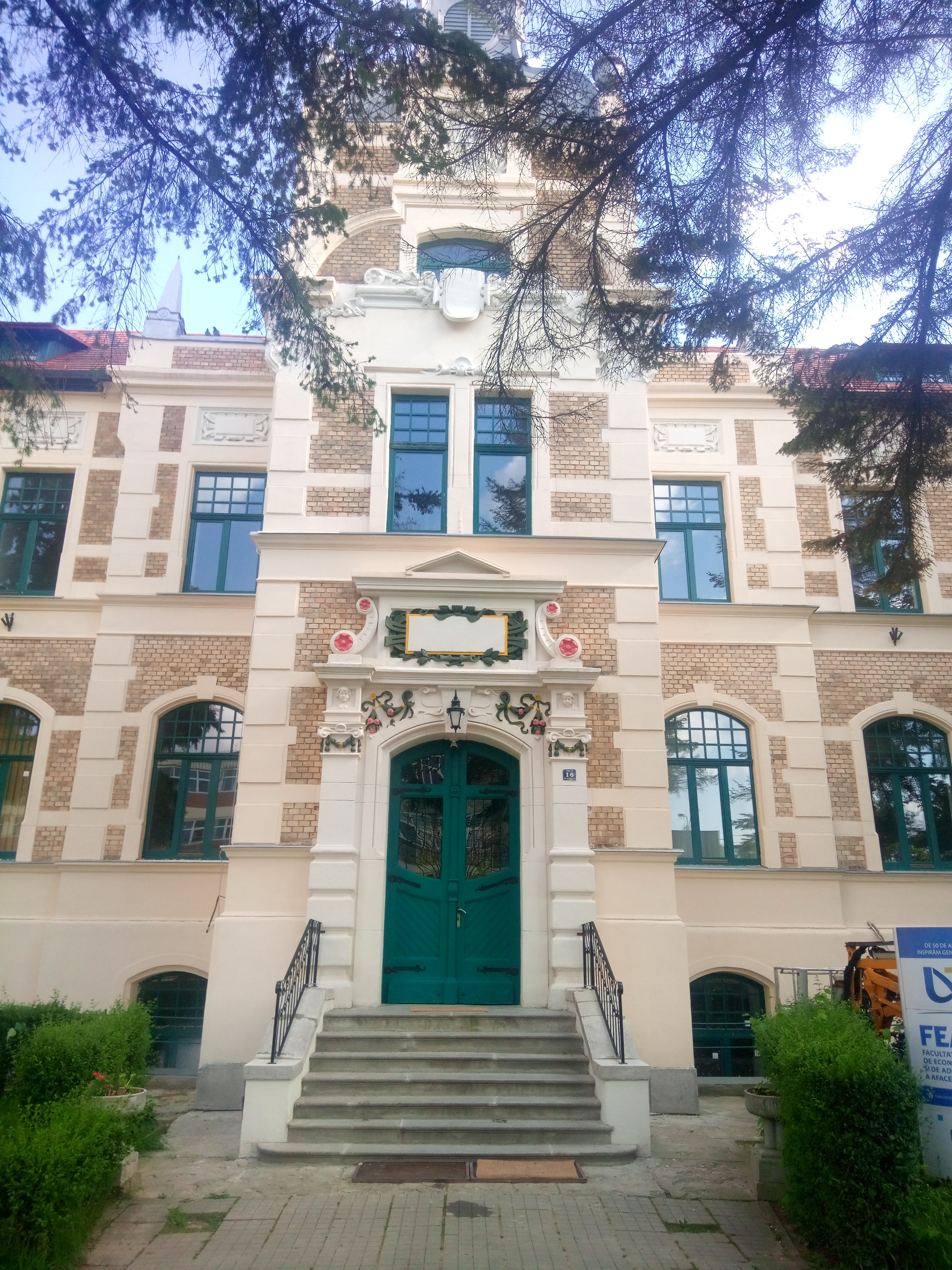
- Former names: Queen Marie Communal Orphanage

General information
- Architectural style: Eclectic
- Address: 16 Johann Heinrich Pestalozzi Street, Timișoara, Romania
- Coordinates: 45°45′15″N 21°14′41″E
- Completed: 1901
- Owner: Faculty of Chemistry, Biology, Geography

Technical details
- Material: Brick

Design and construction
- Architect(s): Ernst Gotthilf
- Main contractor: József Krémer Sr.

The Gisella Orphanage (Romanian: Orfelinatul Gisella) is a historical building in Timișoara, Romania, currently housing the Faculty of Chemistry, Biology, Geography of the West University.

== History ==
The Gisella Orphanage was established in 1873 by a resolution of the municipal council to commemorate the marriage of Princess Gisella and Prince Leopold of Bavaria. The council approved the creation of a foundation valued at 20,000 crowns. Archduchess Gisella Louise Marie of Austria, the second daughter of Emperor Franz Joseph I and Empress Elisabeth (Sissi), was known for her strong philanthropic efforts and deep concern for the underprivileged. She played a key role in founding several charitable organizations aimed at supporting the poor and people with disabilities.

The Gisella Orphanage opened its doors on 20 March 1877, in the former home for the disabled in the Fabric district, on Graben Street (now Gloriei and Ștefan Octavian Iosif). The building was designed to accommodate 40 orphans. From the outset, municipal councilor Anton Suchan took on the supervision of the institution and remained deeply committed throughout his life. As curator and protector of the orphans, he showed unwavering dedication—so much so that he eventually left his entire estate, including two houses in Fabric, to the orphanage.

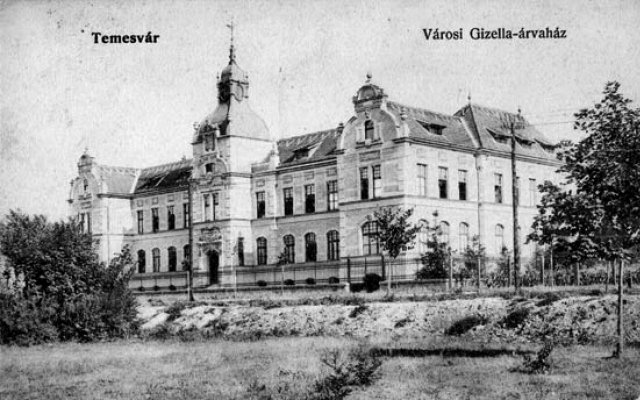
Gisella Orphanage in 1907

The new orphanage building, built in 1901, now serves as the headquarters of the Faculty of Chemistry, Biology, Geography of the West University of Timișoara. Designed by architect Ernst Gotthilf, this impressive building was funded partly by the institution's own resources and a substantial loan.

The single-story building, designed to accommodate up to 80 orphans, was divided into two separate wings—one for girls and the other for boys. The basement housed the dining area and domestic facilities. Children living in the institution had access to a courtyard, a large garden, and a gymnasium, and they attended local public schools. The director resided on-site at the orphanage, which was overseen by a supervisory commission that appointed a curator from among its members—a role held for many years by Anton Suchan. The orphanage accepted children from the age of five, with boys remaining until age 14 and girls until age 16. Upon leaving, they were placed "according to their abilities and desires" into other boarding schools, factories, or apprenticeships—girls often becoming milliners, seamstresses, or, in less favorable cases, maids or chambermaids.

Following World War I, the orphanage was renamed the Queen Marie Communal Orphanage (Romanian: Orfelinatul Comunal Regina Maria) and placed under municipal administration, continuing its mission to support orphaned children from Timișoara and the surrounding region.

== Architecture ==
The Gisella Orphanage Palace showcases an eclectic architectural style, highlighted by a striking central pediment that incorporates a tower adorned with intricate decorative details. The structure features exposed brickwork paired with ornamental plaster accents, creating a bold and visually appealing contrast. The lower section of the building is marked by arched windows that lend it a refined, classical character, while the upper windows are more understated yet seamlessly blend into the overall design. The central tower rises above the roofline, contributing a sense of verticality to the building's composition.
