= Timiș Cinema =

- Interactive map of Timiș Cinema
- Address: 1 Vasile Alecsandri Street, Timișoara
- Coordinates: 45°45′6″N 21°13′30″E
- Owner: Timișoara City Hall
- Capacity: 529
- Type: Cinema

Construction
- Built: 1980s
- Years active: 1980s–2017, 2023–present

Website
- cinematimis-tm.ro

The Timiș Cinema is a multifunctional space for films, concerts, and cultural events in Timișoara, Romania. It is managed by the Timișoara City Hall through the Project Center.

== History ==
Situated in Victory Square at the heart of Timișoara, Timiș Cinema was constructed in the 1980s and remained in operation until 2017 under the management of RADEF. It was the last of the city's traditional cinemas to close. In its basement, Club 30 hosted live concerts and retro music parties, gaining recognition as a popular nightlife venue.

Following an extensive renovation project of approximately 4.5 million euros that began in February 2022, it was reopened in October 2023 and included in the city's cultural circuit. In the first year after reopening, the large hall had 323 film screenings and other cultural events open to the general public, which attracted a total of over 54,000 spectators.

Since 2024, the cinema has become a member of the Europa Cinemas network.

== Amenities ==
Cinema Timiș offers a range of versatile spaces designed for cultural, educational, and social events. The main hall, with a capacity of 529 seats, is equipped with a fixed cinema screen, digital projector, cinema-grade sound system, and an auxiliary audio setup, making it suitable for film screenings, concerts, and various large-scale events.

In the basement, the former Club 30 space has been transformed into a multifunctional hall that can accommodate up to 120 people. This venue features a retractable screen, video projector, professional sound system, and modular furniture, allowing for flexible event setups.

Additionally, the cinema includes three smaller rooms—measuring 50, 40, and 35 square meters respectively—each fitted with interactive screens and modular furniture. These rooms are ideal for hosting workshops, courses, or events with a limited number of participants.

Cinema Timiș also features an entrance hall and a spacious foyer of over 100 square meters. Complementing the venue are two social areas: a street-level café and a bar located in the basement.
