= Alpinet Park =

Park in Timișoara, Romania

- Parcul Alpinet
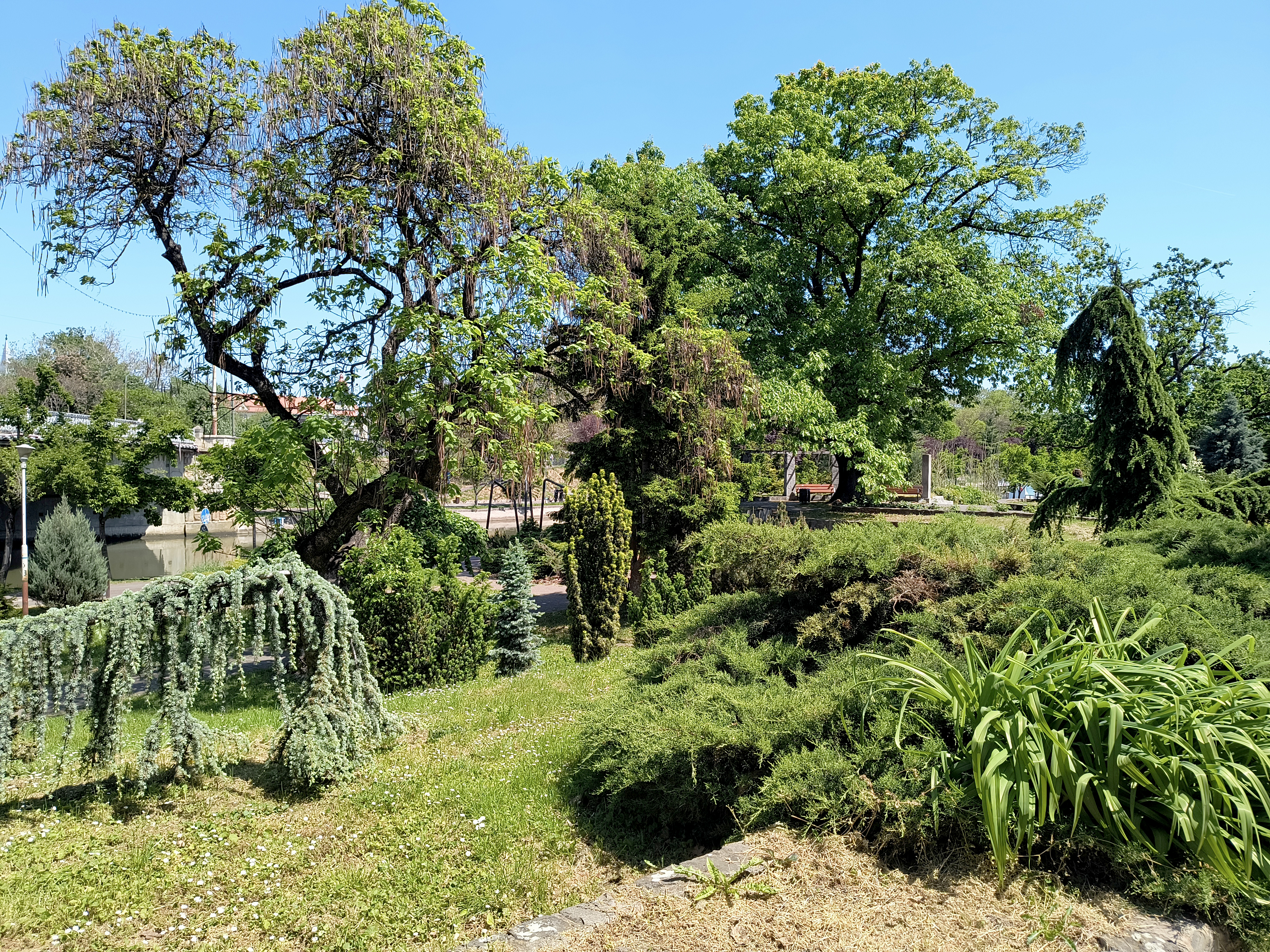
- Interactive map of Alpinet Park
- Type: Urban park
- Location: Timișoara, Romania
- Coordinates: 45°44′55″N 21°13′22″E
- Area: 2.07 ha
- Established: 1934
- Designer: Mihai Demetrovici (1934); Ștefan Iojică (1967)
- Administrator: Timișoara City Hall
- Species: 68

Alpinet Park (Romanian: Parcul Alpinet), also known in the past as the Arboretum, is an urban park along the Bega River in Timișoara. Alpinet Park is one of the young parks of the city, being arranged in the 20th century.

== Location ==
The park is located in Elisabetin, on the left bank of the Bega River and extends between Trajan Bridge and Michael the Brave Bridge.

== History ==
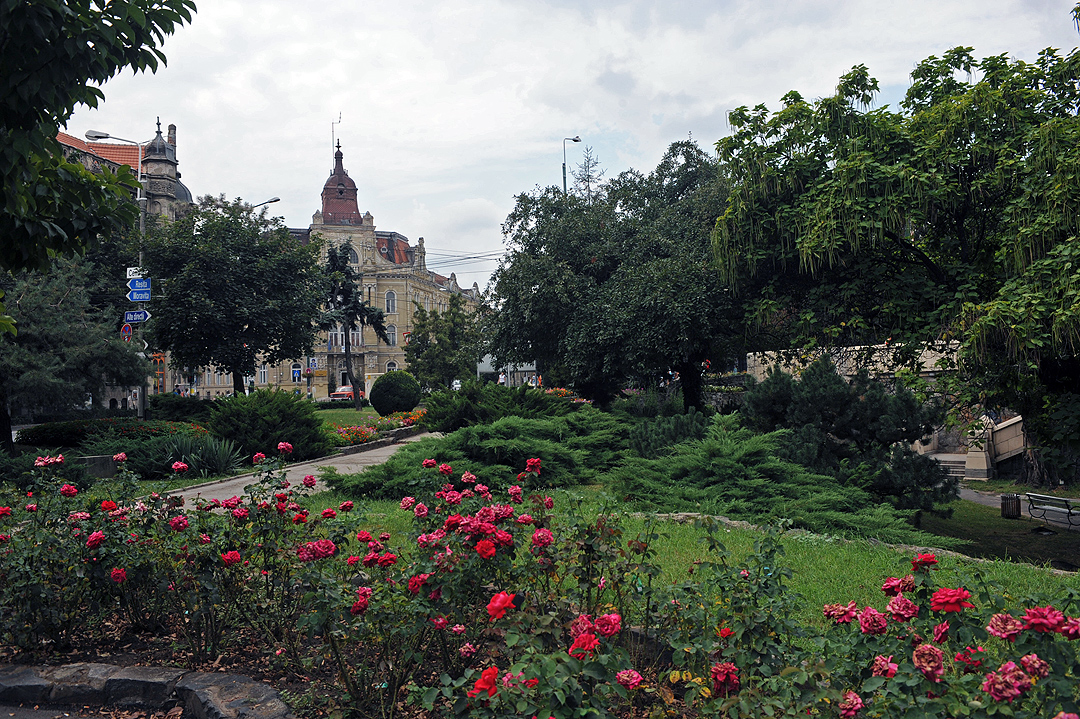
Alpinet Park before the modernization works of 2017–2018

The first arrangements were started in 1930–1934, on an area of 2.2 ha, by architect Mihai Demetrovici, the then director of the horticultural service of the city. Initially, the park was called Arboretum, then Alpinet. The name Alpinet is inspired by the uneven appearance of the land that created terraces with stone walls and by the variety of alpine and subalpine plants.

The park has undergone repeated improvements and changes over time. The current version belongs to architect Ștefan Iojică, made in 1967 on the occasion of a flower exhibition. In 1984, during the sculpture camp "The City Born from Water" organized in Timișoara, ten sculptures created by some of the most renowned Romanian sculptors of that period were installed in this location. Crafted from Viștea limestone, the works include the following:

1. "The Wave" – Sava Stoianov (1951–2016); 2. "Lacustrine" – Ștefan Călărășanu (1947–2013); 3. "Metope" – Nicolae Kruch Jr. (b. 1954); 4. "Knoll" – Aurel Cucu (b. 1954); 5. "Waterfall" – Béla Szakáts (1938–2022)	1. "The Hearth of Time" – Victor Gaga (1930–2003); 2. "The House of Water" – Neculai Băndărău (b. 1949); 3. "Libation" – Florentin Tănăsescu (b. 1953); 4. "The Pillow" – Adrian Ioniță (b. 1952); 5. name and author unknown

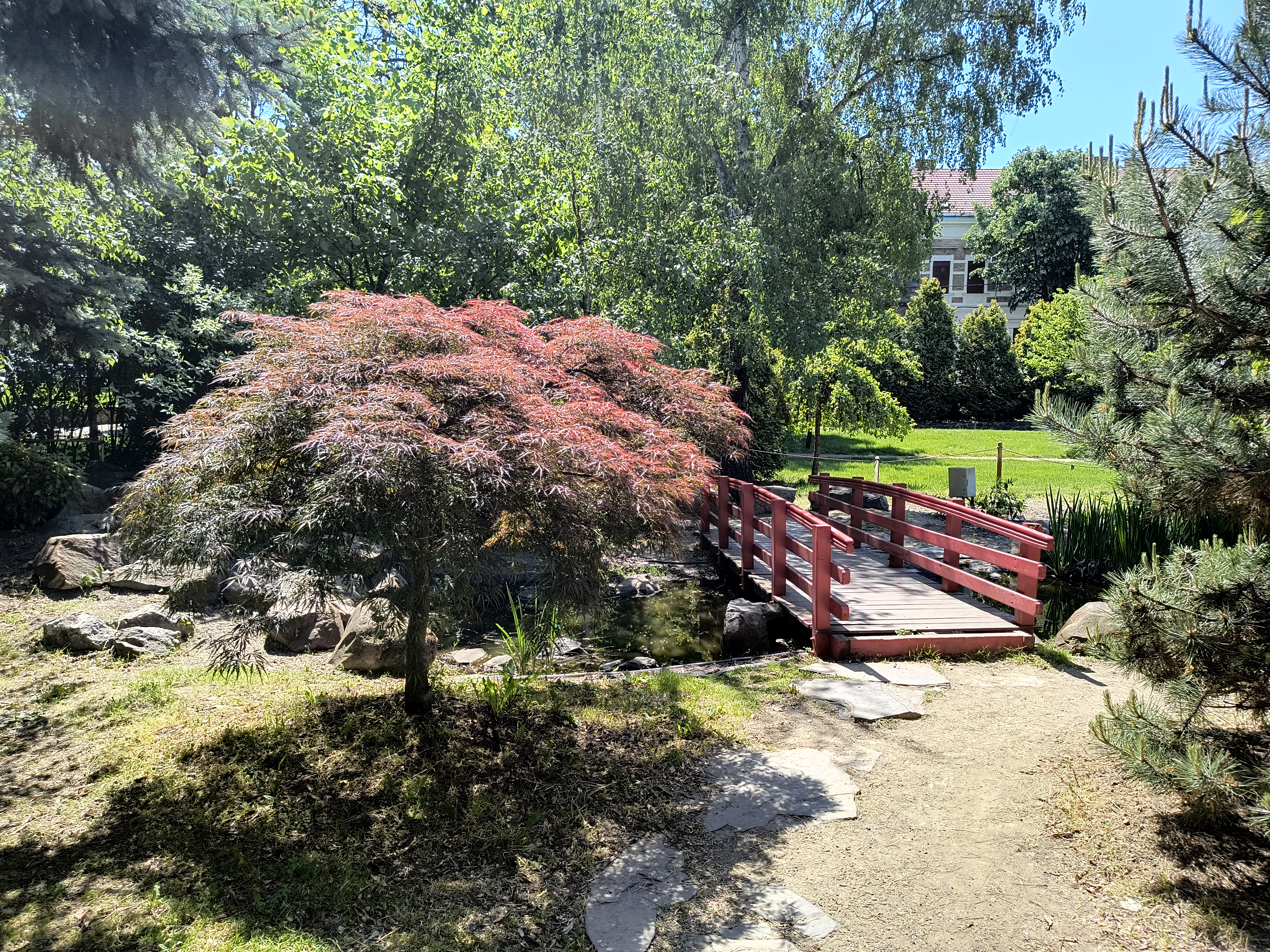
The Japanese Garden

In 2003, the park was refitted by planting dozens of magnolias that replaced the specimens of pyramidal poplars on the river wall. Between 2017–2018, it was rehabilitated and modernized on an area of 14,000 m^{2}. The vegetation was diversified with new species of shrubs, trees and perennials, the alleys were rebuilt, the urban furniture and planters were changed and completed, and the lighting and irrigation systems were modernized. Small lakes and artificial "rivers" stocked with fish were also created in what is today known as the Japanese Garden.
