= Justice Park, Timișoara =

Urban park in Timișoara, Romania

Justice Park
- Parcul Justiției
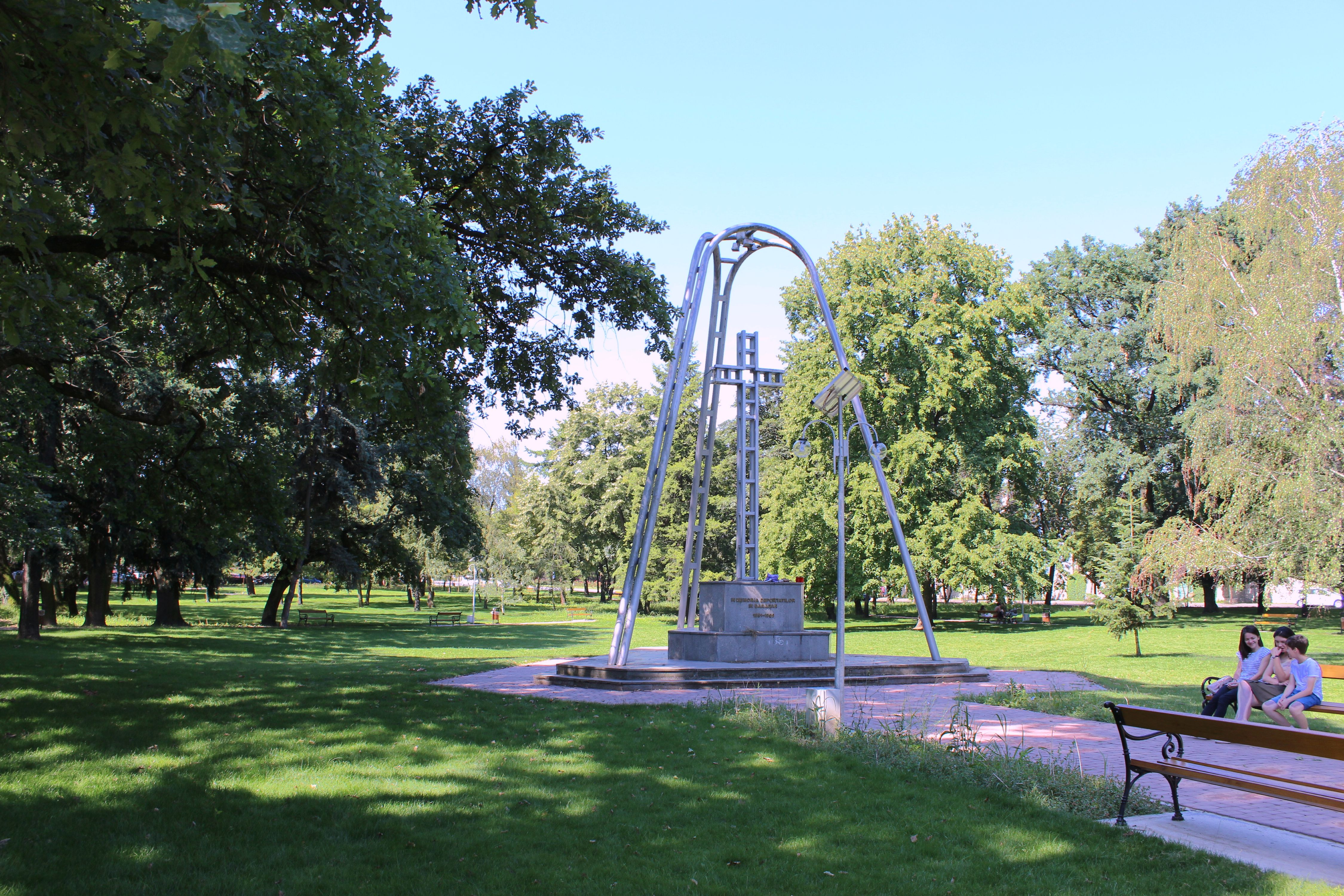
- The Justice Park with the Monument of Deportees in Bărăgan
- Type: Urban park
- Location: Timișoara, Romania
- Coordinates: 45°44′58″N 21°13′37″E
- Area: 3.27 ha
- Administered by: Timișoara City Hall
- Species: 80

The Justice Park (Romanian: Parcul Justiției), previously known as the People's Council Park, is an urban park in central Timișoara.

== Location ==
The Justice Park is located in the center of Timișoara, on Constantin Diaconovici Loga Boulevard, north of the Bega River, opposite the City Hall. It makes the connection between the Cathedral Park and the Roses Park.

== History ==
The park was built in the first decades after World War I. A first arrangement of the park is mentioned in 1934–1935, when many trees and shrubs were planted, but a small glade was maintained inside, giving the impression of a forest inside the city. Its name comes from an old construction project in the area of the Palace of Justice, a project that was eventually abandoned.

In 1996, in the middle of the park, a monument was erected in memory of the people deported to Bărăgan between 1951–1956. Work of the architect Sorin Gavra, the monument was erected by the Association of Former Deportees in Bărăgan, at the time of the commemoration of 45 years since the deportations.

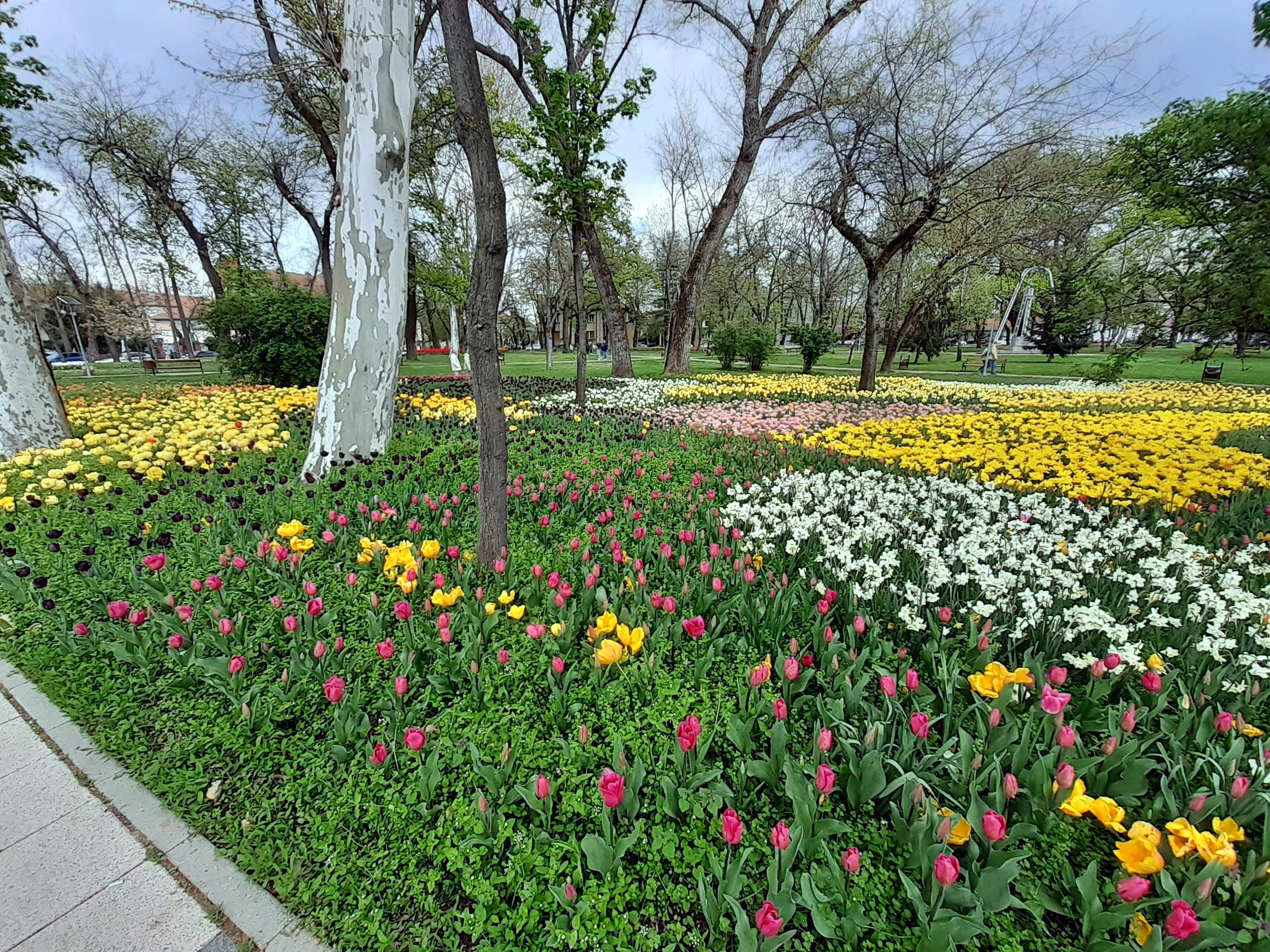
Tulips in Justice Park

In 2015, the park was modernized, being equipped with a photovoltaic lighting system and a camouflaged irrigation system. With the modernization of the park, the fence that surrounded it was demolished. Also, almost 110,000 bulbs of different floral varieties (tulips of different colors, snowdrops, forget-me-nots, pansies, hyacinths) and 60 trees and shrubs were planted, in addition to the existing birches.
