= Cathedral Park, Timișoara =

Park in Romania

Cathedral Park
- Parcul Catedralei
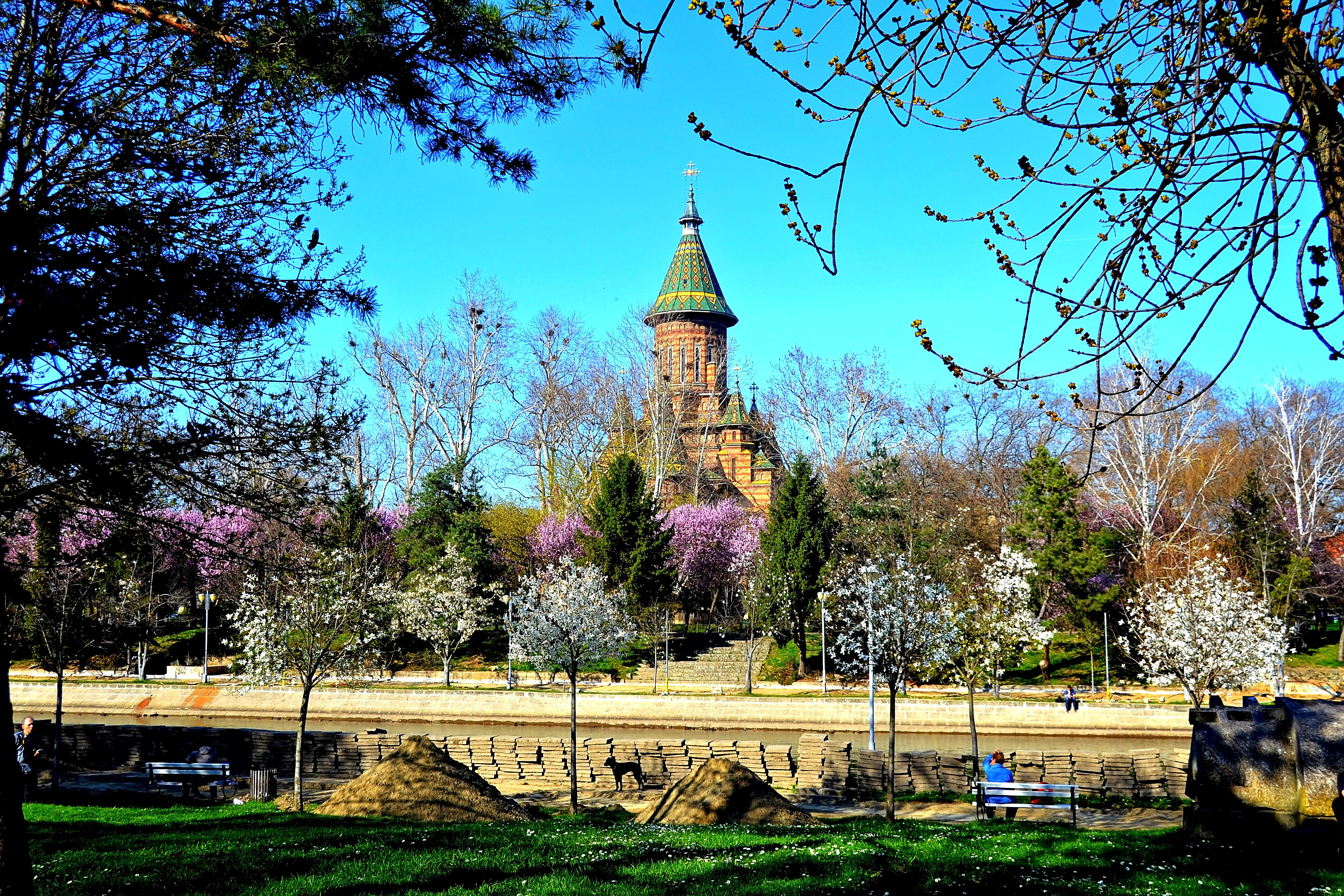
- The Cathedral Park seen from the Alpinet Park
- Interactive map of Cathedral Park
- Type: Urban park
- Location: Timișoara, Romania
- Coordinates: 45°45′0″N 21°13′24″E
- Area: 4.54 ha
- Established: 1967
- Designer: Ștefan Iojică
- Administered by: Timișoara City Hall
- Species: 69

The Cathedral Park (Romanian: Parcul Catedralei) is an urban park in Timișoara. It is located behind the Metropolitan Cathedral, across the Anton Scudier Central Park and covers an area of 45,400 m^{2}.

== Location ==
The Cathedral Park is located behind the Metropolitan Cathedral, between the Bega Canal, King Ferdinand Boulevard and 16 December 1989 Boulevard, with a total area of 45,400 m^{2}, of which 38,000 m^{2} of lawn and trees and 2,900 m^{2} of alleys.

== History ==
The land where the park now stands was until the end of the 18th century a swampy area, between the wandering arms of Bega River in the south of the Timișoara Fortress.

The first arrangement started in 1967 with the contribution of architect Ștefan Iojică. In order to achieve a style unity, the arrangement of the river wall of the Cathedral Park took place simultaneously with the arrangement of the Alpinet Park, located on the opposite bank of the Bega Canal. In that period, the embankment was reshaped, the paved promenade on the river wall, the stairs, the fountains, the lighting and the first plantings were executed.

== Flora ==
In the park there are specimens of planes over 100 years old, the existing trees here being mostly deciduous. Initially many more, they were repeatedly affected by storms, breaking their tops or even the entire crown due to their isolation, in alignments, not being protected by a well-closed massif, the rest of the woody vegetation having much lower heights. Also here can be found alignments of yews, chestnuts, locusts, as well as alignments of Magnolia kobus on the waterfront, firs, birches, pines, spruces, elms, cherry plums, willows, Forsythia, maples, oaks, lilacs.
