= Jean Balissat =

Jean Balissat (May 15, 1936 – September 16, 2007) was a composer, a professor of music and the conductor of various Swiss orchestras.

== Biography ==
Jean Balissat was born in Lausanne, Switzerland. He studied counterpoint and harmony with Hans Haug in Lausanne. In 1954, he moved to Geneva, where he studied the orchestration of Andre-Francois Marescotti and course management with Samuel Baud-Bovy. He also studied percussion with Charles Peschier and the horn with Robert Faller.

From 1972 to 1983, he was professor of composition and orchestration at the University of Geneva. Since 1979, he also served as a professor at the University of Lausanne. Moreover, he was from 1960 to 1983 in the conductor of various brass orchestras, including 12 years at the helm of La Landwehr in Fribourg.

Balissat died in September 2007 in Corcelles-le-Jorat, Switzerland.

== Works ==
- Adagio et fugue (1956) pour violon et piano
- Sept variations pour octuor (1971)
- Fête des vignerons (1977) sur un livret d'Henri Debluë
- Rückblick (1980) pour violon et orchestre
- Incantation et sacrifice (1981) essai pour une harmonie bicéphale
- Bioméros (1982) pour orchestre de chambre
- Le Chant de l'Alpe (1994) pour orchestre à vents
- Gli Elementi (1998) pour orchestre d'harmonie
- Le premier jour pour orchestre d'harmonie
- Les Gursks pour orchestre d'harmonie
- Petite ouverture romantique pour orchestre à vents
- Preludio Alfetto pour orchestre à vents
- Second Sinfonietta For Band pour orchestre de cuivres
- Sinfonie pour orchestre d'harmonie
- Songes d'automne pour orchestre d'harmonie
- Statterostrob pour piano seul
- Variations concertantes pour trois percussionnistes et orchestre
