= Blue Ribbon Commission on Race, Memorials and Public Spaces =

Committee in Charlottesville, Virginia, US

The Blue Ribbon Commission on Race, Memorials and Public Spaces is a committee in Charlottesville, Virginia which the city established in 2016 to address the Charlottesville historic monument controversy.

In August 2016 Sue Lewis accepted an appointment to the commission.

By September 2016 various city projects had aligned with the work and research of the commission.

In November 2016 the commission published a recommendation to keep the monuments in place. Charlottesville mayor Michael Signer said that he supported and sought to follow the commission's "transform in place" recommendation.
