= List of festivals in Timișoara =

This is a list of festivals in Timișoara, Romania.

== Music ==
- Citadel Organs International Festival (organ music)
- CODRU Festival – music, art and environmental protection festival
- Flight Festival (world music) – the largest music, art and technology festival in western Romania
- JAZZx (jazz music)
- Musical Timișoara International Festival (symphonic music) – the oldest music festival in Timișoara, first organized in 1969 under the patronage of Nicolae Boboc and Ion Românu
- Opera and Operetta Festival
- Timișoara Baroque Festival (baroque music)
- Timișoara Early Music Festival (classical music)
- Timișoara Music Awards

== Theatre and film ==
- Ceau, Cinema! Film Festival
- Diogene Bihoi Theatre Week – organized by the Thespis Theatre of the Student Culture House
- European Film Festival
- Eurothalia European Theatre Festival – organized by the German State Theatre
- FEST-FDR – organized by the Mihai Eminescu National Theatre
- Festival du Film Français
- German Film Days
- Hungarian Film Days
- Italian Film Festival
- Les Films de Cannes à Timișoara
- Nordic Film Festival
- Taifas Festival – Balkan film and culture festival
- TESZT – organized by the Csiky Gergely Hungarian State Theatre
- Timishort Film Festival
- Très Court International Film Festival

== Art, culture and technology ==
- Bega Boulevard Festival – festival comprising concerts, painting, drawing, facepainting, juggling and theatre workshops and culminating with a rubber duck race on the Bega Canal
- Beta – Timișoara Architecture Biennial
- Festival of Lights
- Festival of the Ethnicities
- Festival of the Hearts
- Fisart International Street Art Festival
- Huniade Castle Medieval Festival
- ISWinT – intercultural festival for worldwide university students
- Launmomentdat în parc – pop up and vinyl fair with DJ set
- LitVest – organized by the Sorin Titel County Library
- PLAI Festival – outdoor festival comprising musical presentations, film screenings, theatre performances and artistic workshops
- Simultan Festival – festival comprising live concerts, film screenings, conferences and contemporary art demonstrations
- StudentFest – international student festival of art and culture
- Timișoara Fashion Days
- Timișoara International Dance Festival
- Timișoara Pride Week – LGBT festival also including a pride parade
- Timișoara Refugee Art Festival

== Gastronomy and handicrafts ==
- LA PAS Festival – sustainable food and culture festival
- Street Food Festival
