= Timișoara Palace of Culture =

Palace of Culture
- Palatul Culturii
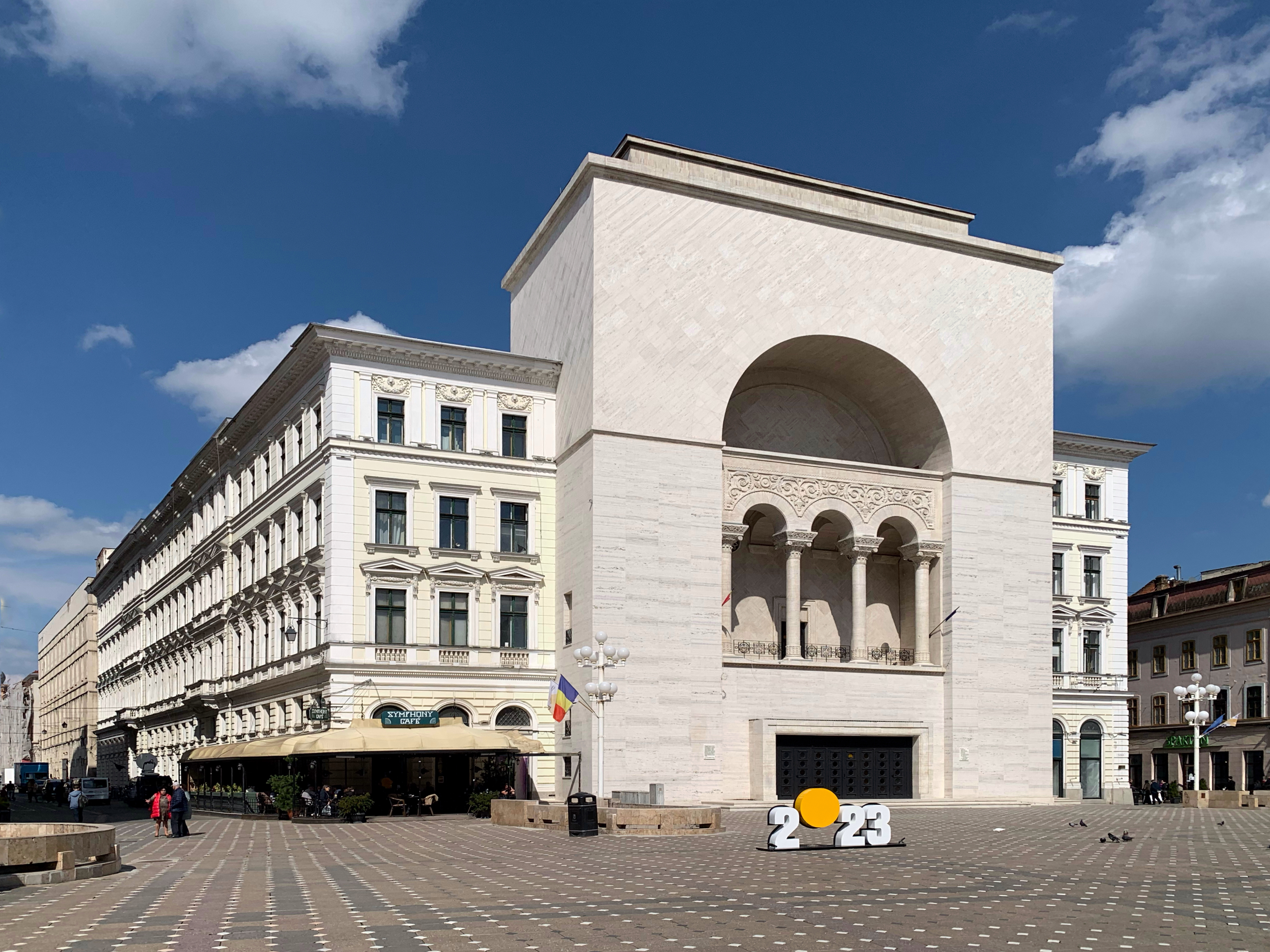
- The palace in 2023
- Interactive map of the Palace of Culture area

General information
- Architectural style: Renaissance Revival (1875); International (façade, 1936)
- Location: Victory Square, Timișoara
- Coordinates: 45°45′15.23″N 21°13′33.65″E
- Current tenants: Romanian National Opera; Mihai Eminescu National Theatre; Csiky Gergely Hungarian State Theatre; German State Theatre
- Construction started: 1872
- Completed: 1875
- Renovated: 1928, 1936
- Cost: ƒ1.44 million
- Renovation cost: 2.66 million lei
- Owner: Timișoara City Hall

Technical details
- Floor count: 4

Design and construction
- Architecture firm: Fellner & Helmer
- Main contractor: Színház-, Hotel- és Vigadóépítő Rt

Renovating team
- Architect: Duiliu Marcu

The Palace of Culture (Romanian: Palatul Culturii) is an emblematic building in Timișoara, Romania. It hosts a number of cultural institutions, including the Romanian National Opera, the Mihai Eminescu National Theatre, the Csiky Gergely Hungarian State Theatre and the German State Theatre. On 31 October 1918, the unification of Banat and Romania was agreed upon in the Kronprinz Rudolf restaurant, located on the ground floor, by a group led by Aurel Cosma. On 20 December 1989, during the Romanian Revolution, the Democratic Romanian Front was founded in the Palace of Culture and Timișoara was declared free from communism. The building is a historical monument of national importance, listed under LMI code TM-II-m-A-06118. It occupies the northern side of Victory Square and is one of the main landmarks of the city.

== Background ==
Theatre in Timișoara has been recorded from as far back as 1753. From 1761, plays took place at the Serbian magistrate's headquarters, on today's Gheorghe Lazăr Avenue (where the Nikolaus Lenau High School now stands), in a theatre run by Joseph Hasenhut. The auditorium had 155 seats in the stalls, 26 seats in the ground floor boxes, 26 in the boxes on the first floor, 21 in the boxes on the second floor and a balcony. In 1766 the building burned down and had to be rebuilt. Following the merging of German and Serbian magistracies in 1781, the building was used exclusively as a theatre. The theatre building was destroyed during the siege of 1849 and rebuilt in 1852.

== History ==
=== Before World War I ===
The 1852 structure proved to be too small to continue hosting the theatre, so talks about constructing a new building started. At Mayor Károly Küttel's initiative, the Company for the Construction of the Theatre, Redouta Hall and Hotel in Timișoara was created in 1860, to raise funds through selling theatre boxes and accessing a bank loan. The new building would be erected inside the city walls, in a place where the Barracks of the Petrovaradin Gate (also known as the Grenadiers' Barracks) were previously located. Plans were drawn up by Ferdinand Fellner the Elder's architecture firm in Vienna and were approved in 1871. Fellner the Elder died the same year, and construction work began in 1872. During his visit on site on 7 May 1872, Franz Joseph I, the Emperor of Austria, agreed that the theatre would bear his name. From 1873, Ferdinand Fellner the Elder's son of the same name partnered with Hermann Helmer, and their firm oversaw the construction by Színház-, Hotel- és Vigadóépítő Rt (Theatres, Hotels and Entertainment Venues Builder Co.), which was completed in 1875. There were 900 seats in the theatre auditorium. The building also hosted the Kronprinz Rudolf hotel and the Redouta dancing hall. On the side of Rudolf Street (now Alba Iulia Street) was a café, a lecture hall, a bowling alley and a small club used mainly by card players. The total cost was 1,440,000 forints. The building was formally opened on 22 September 1875, and the first play staged was a work by the leading Hungarian dramatist Ede Szigligeti.

A fire broke out in the evening of 30 April 1880, destroying the auditorium. Part of the wardrobe, a piano and the library could be saved. As the company that owned the building had been bankrupt for two years, the city authorities purchased it for 150,000 florins and invested an additional 120,000 florins for renovation work, which closely followed original plans. The reopening took place on 12 December 1882. Slowly, the city bought all the theatre boxes back from their owners.

It was planned that four statues be installed on theatre's façade in dedicated niches around 10 meters above ground: Thalia, the muse of comedy; Melpomene, the muse of tragedy; Euterpe, the muse of lyric poetry; and Terpsichore, the muse of dance and choral music. Each of them weighed approximately 900 kg and measured almost three meters in height. At the building's opening the statues were missing; it is believed that they were sold for 200 florins to Mathias Stein, who have used them to decorate his house in the Elisabetin district, although two of them appear in their niches in photographs dating from 1891 and later.

A massive restoration project was carried out in 1890. Interior furniture was refurbished by carpenter Ferenc Gungl, the main hall was gilded by Jenő Sprang, and sculptures were repaired by Alajos Heine. The heating system was upgraded, and the toilet facilities were upgraded. An electric motor was installed for the iron front curtain, which was an innovation in itself, serving as an anti-incendiary mechanism by containing fire; at the time fires in theatres usually originated from the stage. Additionally, two water pools were built, and the roof was repaired.

=== After World War I ===
The first Romanian language performance – a translation of one of Otto Ernst's works – was performed on 7 August 1919 by a group of artists from Craiova.

On 31 October 1920, another fire broke out. It was more powerful than the one of 1880 and took several days to extinguish. The main building was completely destroyed. The iron front curtain could not be lowered, which fuelled theories that foul play may have been involved. Only the wardrobe, the library, two sets and, among the musical instruments, only two cellos could be saved.

Due to the difficult circumstances in Romania in the aftermath of World War I, the restoration of the building dragged on. It began on 15 July 1923, when architect Duiliu Marcu was entrusted with drawing up plans. King Ferdinand I laid the foundation stone of the reconstruction on 12 November 1923. Marcu did not drastically alter the façade of the building, although the main entrance was widened by abandoning the three separate doors and demolishing the pillars between them and a console canopy was provided above the entrance. Laterally, on the risalti, two display windows have been set up. A half-dome was provided on the roof, covering a concrete basin containing water for firefighting purposes. The pool was separated from the main hall by a strong concrete wall. In order to increase the capacity of the main hall, 23 rooms were taken from the former Kronprinz Rudolf hotel (at that time Hotel Ferdinand). Following the reorganization, the number of seats in the auditorium reached 982. The theatre, now named the "Communal Theatre", reopened on 15 January 1928 with the show Red roses by Zaharia Bârsan. The name "Palace of Culture" dates back to the 1930s when the building housed the Banat Museum (between 1937 and 1951), the Academy of Fine Arts and the Banat–Crișana Social Institute, as well as the theatre.

At the beginning of the 20th century nearby buildings included Lloyd Palace (built in 1912), Löffler Palace (1913), palaces on the nearby Corso and, most notably, immediately to its right, the Palace of Băncile Bănățene Reunite (1933), a consortium of local Swabian banks. All these buildings were taller than the theatre, which was the focus of the view down Ferdinand Boulevard, so it was felt necessary to update its façade. This was again entrusted to Duiliu Marcu, who raised the façade by placing a travertine-clad "triumphal arch" around the entrance and the balcony on the first floor. In order to standardize the style of the façade, the windows on the sides of the arch were blocked up. The reconstruction of the façade cost 2,660,023 lei.

In the 1970s, on the corner between Mărășești and Victor Vlad Delamarina streets, a building in the modern post-war style was built following a project by architect Tiberiu Selegean, which housed the theatre's warehouses. In 2003 the sides of the main façade regained their initial appearance in a restoration project managed by architect Marcela Titz.

=== Present day ===
The following institutions are active in the building today: Romanian National Opera, Mihai Eminescu National Theatre, Csiky Gergely Hungarian State Theatre and German State Theatre. The Opera and the National Theatre organize their shows in the Great Hall, and the Hungarian- and German-language theatres use the Redouta Hall. The building also houses an urban planning workshop, the city's tourism information center and various shops.

== Architecture ==
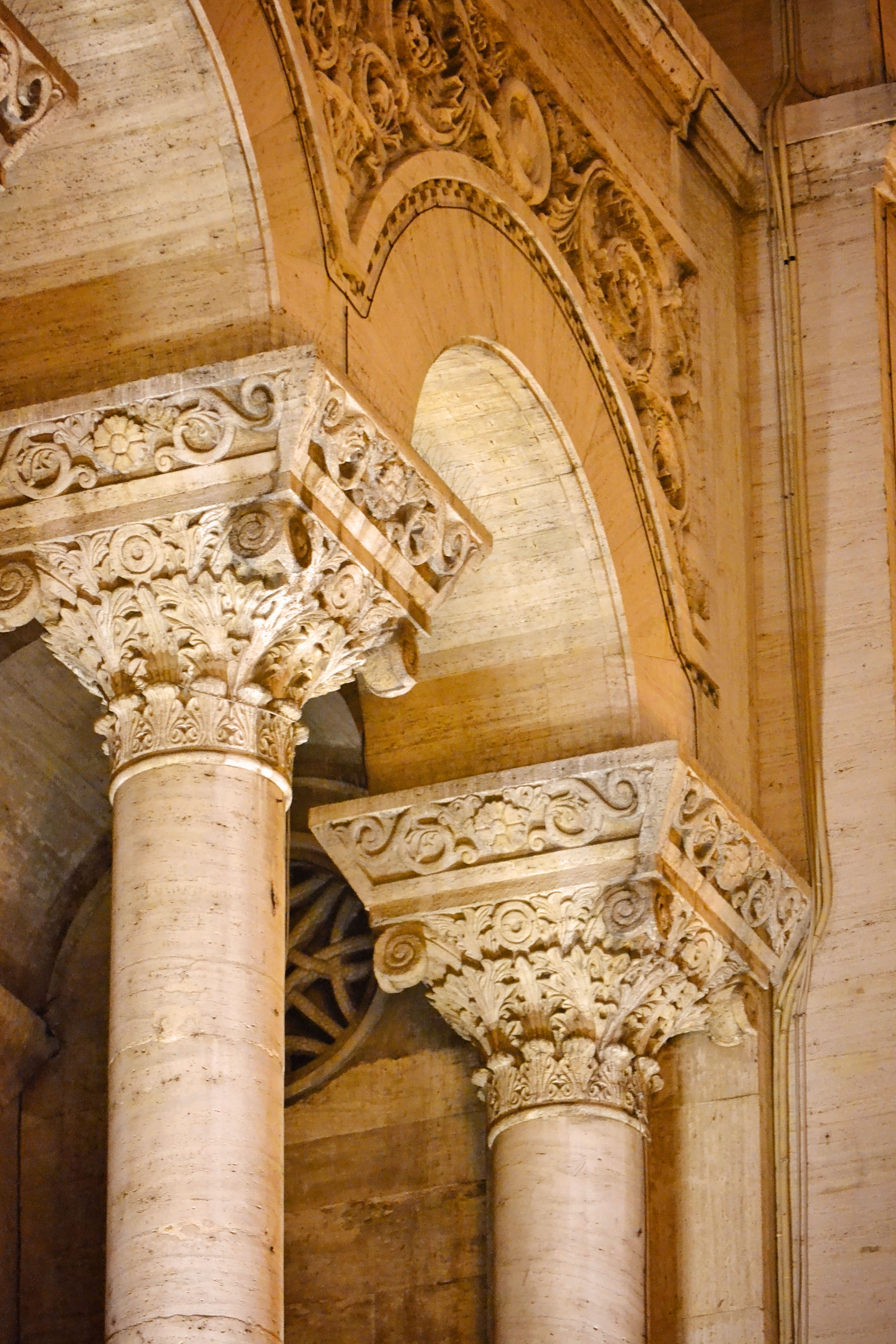
Architectural details of the balcony

The style of Fellner & Helmer's project was historicist eclecticism, with classicist and neo-Baroque elements, a style known at the time as Italian Renaissance. The original façade was characterized by the entrance with three full-arched openings and a low-pitched roof. Inside, the auditorium offered about 900 seats and was decorated with caryatids. The ceiling was decorated with four paintings each inscribed in a circle, made by Heinrich Schwemminger of Vienna, representing the muses Melpomene, Thalia, Eutherpe and Terpsichora.

After the fire of 1920, except for the front doors, the façade was restored in its original style. The auditorium was enlarged by recovering the space of the 23 rooms that had belonged to the Ferdinand Hotel, bringing the number of seats to 982. The interior of the theatre was completely rebuilt in neo-Romanian eclectic style, with neo-Byzantine and Art Deco ornaments. The ceiling was decorated with frescoes made in 1926 by Theodor Kiriakoff-Suruceanu who reproduced characters from the history and fairy tales of the Romanian people.

There are three performance halls in the building. The main hall, known as the "Great Hall", has a capacity of 722 seats: 330 in the stalls, 107 in the lodges, 40 on the first balcony (in front of the lodges), 160 on the second balcony (above the lodges) and 85 in the gallery. Of these, 686 places are for advance tickets, seven places are reserved for staff and 29 are spare. There is a standing zone in the gallery, so the capacity of the hall is 982 spectators. The stage is 23 × 13 m. An Ovidius quote is displayed on the central lodge: Ars ultimam mores animumque effingere poset, pulchrior in terris nulla tabella foret. Si bene quid facias, cito fac; nam si cito factum, gratum erit, ingratum gratia tarda facit. Si vox est, canta; si mollia brachia, salta; et quaqumque potes arte placere, place: Ovidius (If art could depict the manners and the soul, no painting would be more beautiful on earth. If you do something right, do it quickly, because if it is done quickly, it will be pleasant; late gratitude produces dissatisfaction. If you have a voice, sing; if you have tender limbs, dance, and through any art, if you can produce pleasure, produce. Ovidius).

The Redouta Hall has a capacity of 126 seats and facilities for translating shows in Hungarian and German. The Uțu Strugari Studio Hall (formerly Studio 5) is located on the third floor, and has a capacity of 50 seats.

=== Controversies regarding the façade ===
Between 1934 and 1936 the main façade was changed. The style of the pillars of the balcony, of the capitals and of the decorations above was changed to Romanian Revival style, and the façade received a monumental aspect, characteristic of the time, but which did not match the style of the surrounding buildings, sparking contemporary protests. It was said that Duiliu Marcu, admiring the Italian architect Marcello Piacentini, designed the façade in fascist style, and that it should be returned to the pre-1928 version, which was partially done in 2003, when the sides of the façade were restored to their original shape, but with the central element left unaltered.

There is debate as to whether the facade should be returned to its original form; revolutionaries oppose it because a symbol of the Romanian Revolution would be damaged. It was also proposed that only the arch be changed, with the balcony left as it is. However, the façade cannot be completely restored to its 1928 condition. The old façade was believed to be intact under the travertine slabs and it was hoped that the statues on the original façade would be discovered, recovered and displayed in front of the building.

Changes to the façade over time
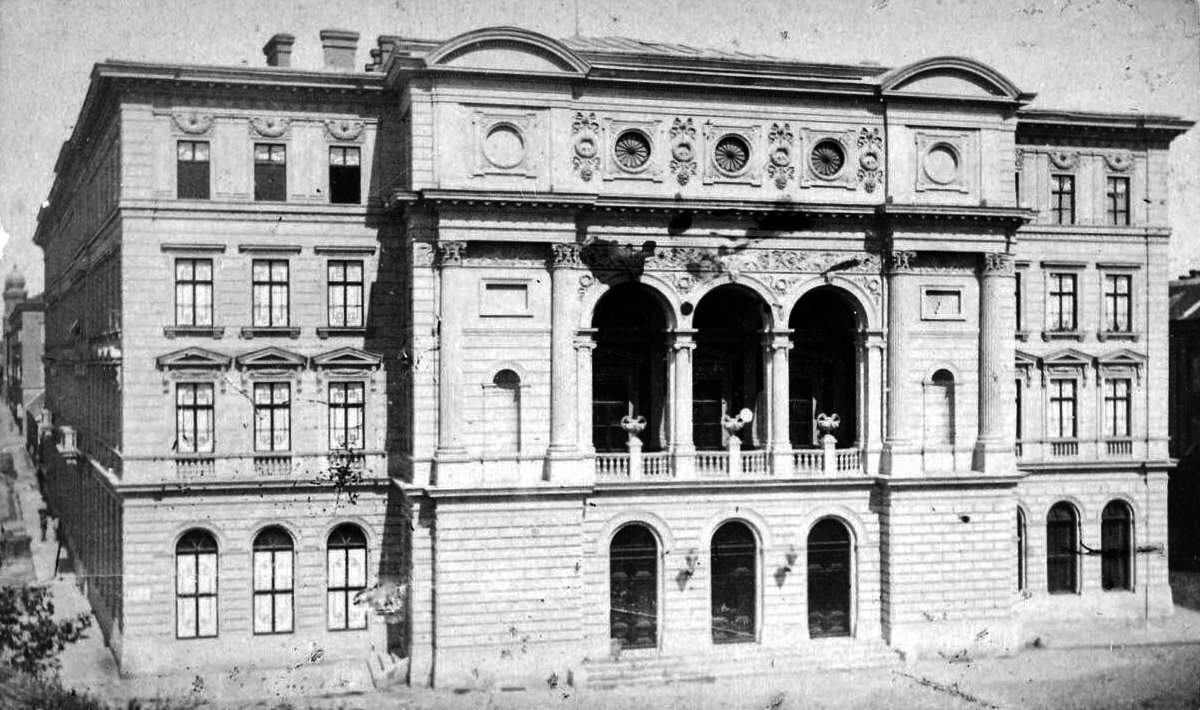
Before the fire of 1880

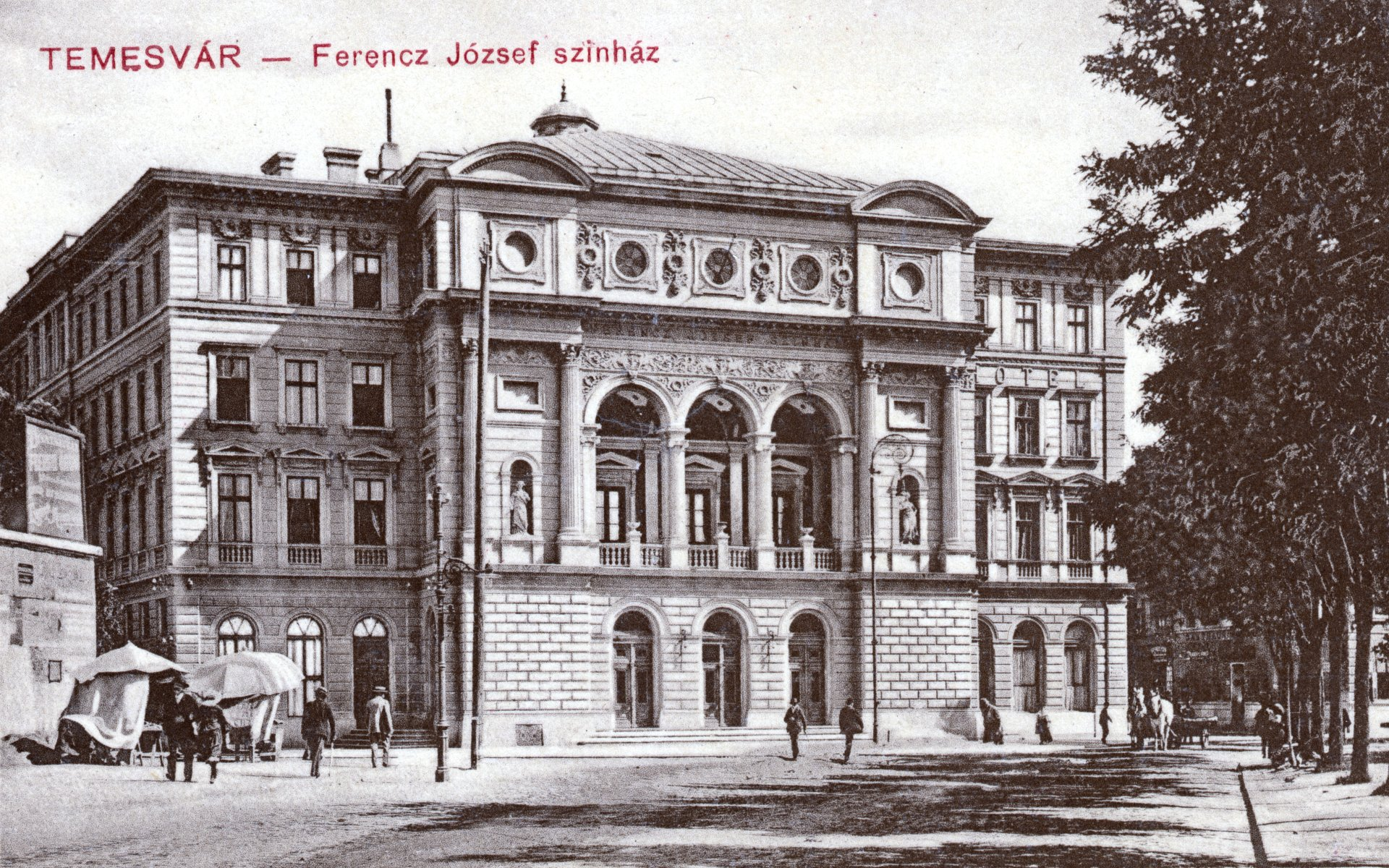
1882–1920

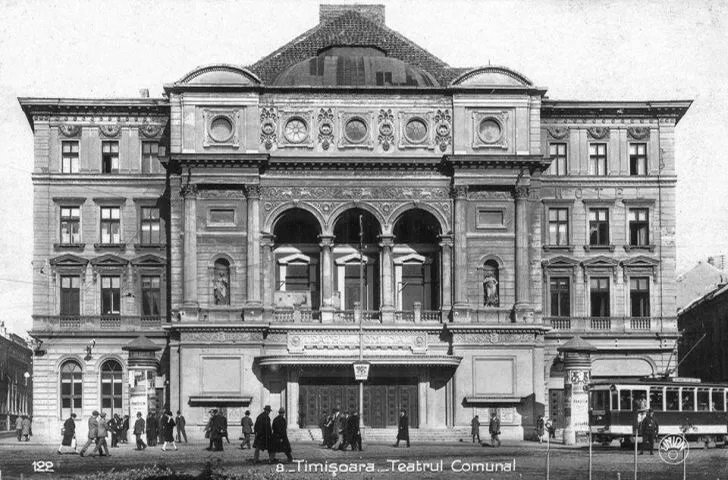
1928–1936

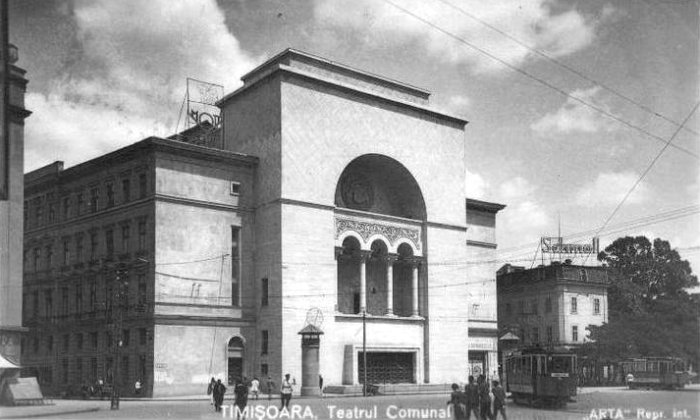
1936–2003

== Historical events ==
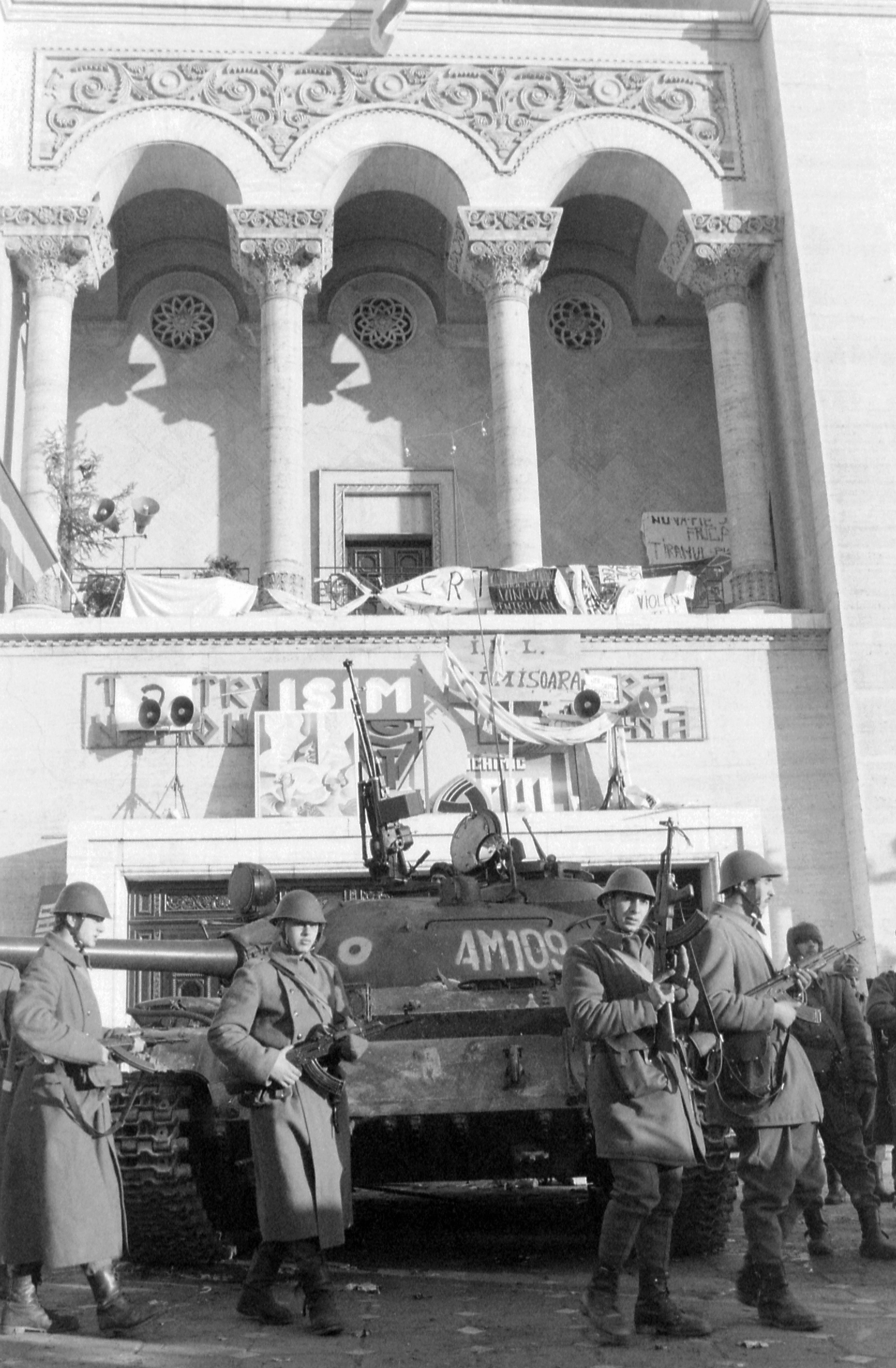
Soldiers and tanks in front of the Palace of Culture during the Romanian Revolution

In addition to the visits of the two sovereigns, Franz Joseph and Ferdinand, various historical events took place in the building:

- On 31 October 1918, after Otto Roth had declared in the Great Hall of the Military Casino in front of the officers summoned there the establishment of the Banat Republic and the attachment for the new Hungarian government, Aurel Cosma went up to the rostrum and declared that the Romanians would not comply with the Budapest directives and asked the Romanian officers to leave the hall. They went to the Kronprinz Rudolf restaurant, where they formed the Romanian National Military Council, to militate for the union of Banat with Romania.
- In 1940, the refugee National Theatre and the Romanian Opera of Cluj were temporarily housed there.
- On 20 December 1989, the Romanian Democratic Front was established there; the same day that on the theatre's balcony Timișoara was declared free from communism.
