= National Museum of Banat =

Romanian museum

- Muzeul Național al Banatului
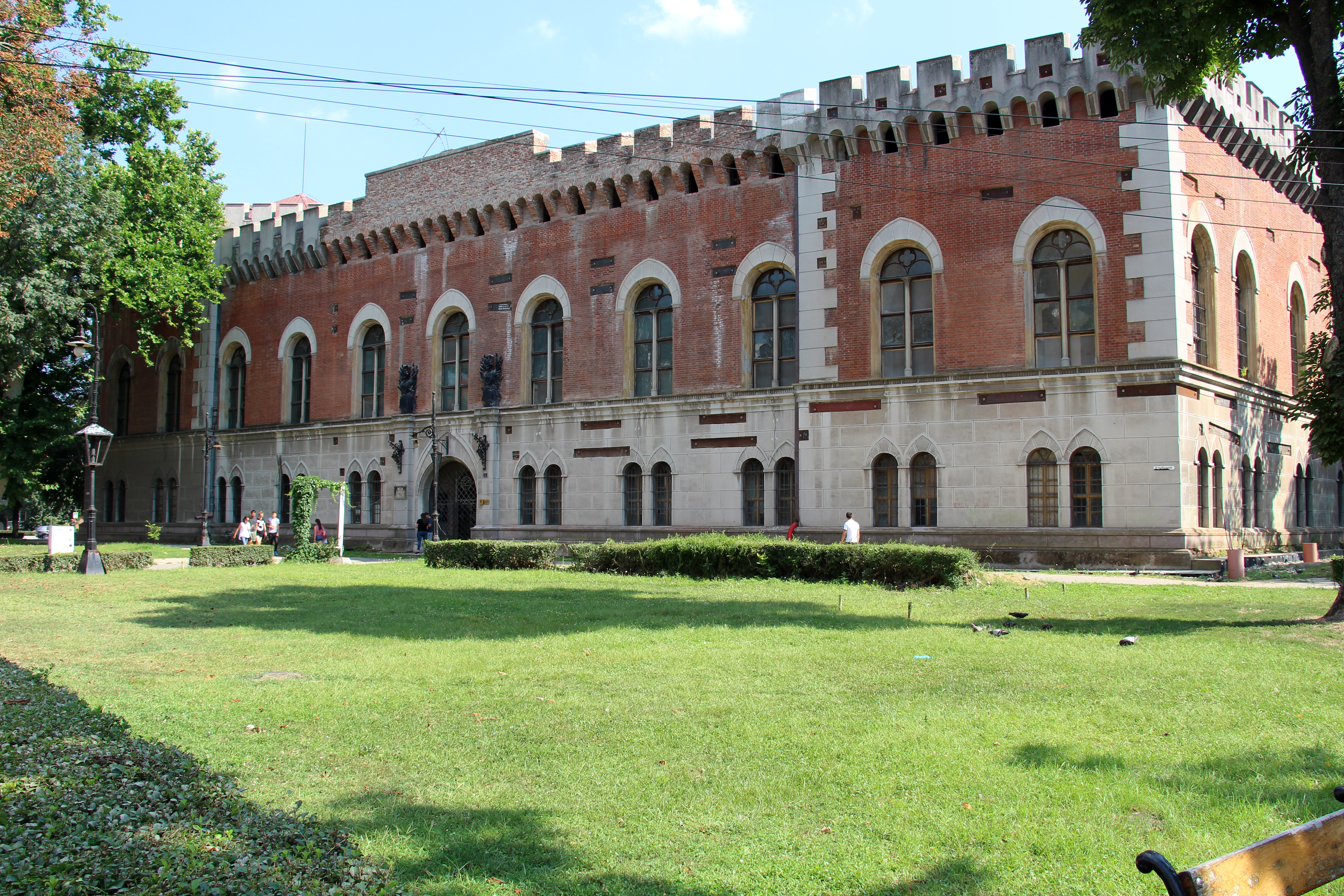
- Former name: Museum of Banat (until 2016)
- Established: 25 July 1872
- Location: Timișoara
- Coordinates: 45°45′11″N 21°13′37″E
- Accreditation: National Heritage Institute
- Collections: Archaeology, history, natural sciences
- Founder: Zsigmond Ormós
- Director: Claudiu Ilaș
- Website: mnab.ro

The National Museum of Banat (Romanian: Muzeul Național al Banatului; abbreviated MNaB) is a museum in Timișoara, Romania, headquartered in Huniade Castle. It was founded in 1872 by the Society of History and Archaeology of Banat (Romanian: Societatea de Istorie și Arheologie din Banat) on the initiative of the prefect of the then Temes County Zsigmond Ormós. It hosts the largest collection of archaeological objects in Banat. The ground floor houses the 6,200-year-old Parța Neolithic Sanctuary. The museum includes departments for archaeology, history and natural sciences. The museum also has a laboratory for conservation and preservation of objects of cultural heritage and history.

== History ==
The establishment of the Society of History and Archaeology of Banat on 25 July 1872 on the initiative of Prefect Zsigmond Ormós laid the foundations of the Museum of Banat. The first exhibits were initially housed in a room in the Palace of the Bishopric of Cenad and consisted of donations, adventitious archaeological discoveries and acquisitions. In 1876, with the support of the prefect of Temes County, the Society of History and Archaeology received two exhibition rooms in the Wellauer House on Lonovics Street (present-day Augustin Pacha Street), the museum's headquarters until the interwar period. The official opening of the museum to the public took place a year later. When the Wellauer House was extensively renovated in 1887, the exhibits were temporarily stored in the old town hall. In 1888, the construction of the Museum Palace (today the Romanian Academy Library) was completed. The palace proved to be too small and did not have enough storage space, so that in 1937 it was decided that the museum should be moved to the Palace of Culture, in the current building of the Romanian Opera and the National Theatre.

At the beginning of the last decade of the 19th century, the museum had the following collections: archaeology and ancient history, pinacotheca, natural sciences, library and archive. In 1896, the Museum of Banat participated in the Budapest Millennium Exhibition with several objects, winning a bronze medal and a certificate of appreciation. Personalities who made outstanding contributions to the Museum of Banat before World War I were Jenő Szentkláray, István Berkeszi, István Pontelly, István Patzner, Achill Deschán and Gergely Kabdebó.

After Banat came under Romanian administration as a result of the Treaty of Trianon on 4 June 1920, a restructuring of the museum took place under Emanuil Ungureanu, cultural inspector of Timișoara in the interwar period. Romanian personalities who are credited with the Museum of Banat were Ioachim Miloia, Dionisie Linția, Aurel Ciupe, Marius Moga and Constantin Daicoviciu. The current headquarters in the Huniade Castle was obtained by the Timișoara City Hall for the museum in 1947. Until 2000, it included the following departments: History, Natural Sciences, Art, Ethnography, Banat Village Museum and Zonal Restoration Laboratory. The Banat Village Museum and the Art Department became independent museums in 2000 and 2006, respectively. The Huniade Castle was closed in 2010 for restoration works. The Museum of Banat received the status of national museum in 2016. Its temporary headquarters for the organization of temporary exhibitions and cultural events is the Theresia Bastion.

== Associated museums ==
- Ștefan Jäger Memorial Exhibition in Jimbolia
- Béla Bartók Memorial Exhibition in Sânnicolau Mare
- Popa Popa's Museum in Timișoara
- Traian Vuia Memorial Exhibition in Traian Vuia
