= Merlin Children's and Youth Theatre =

Theatre in Timișoara, Romania

- Teatrul pentru Copii și Tineret „Merlin”
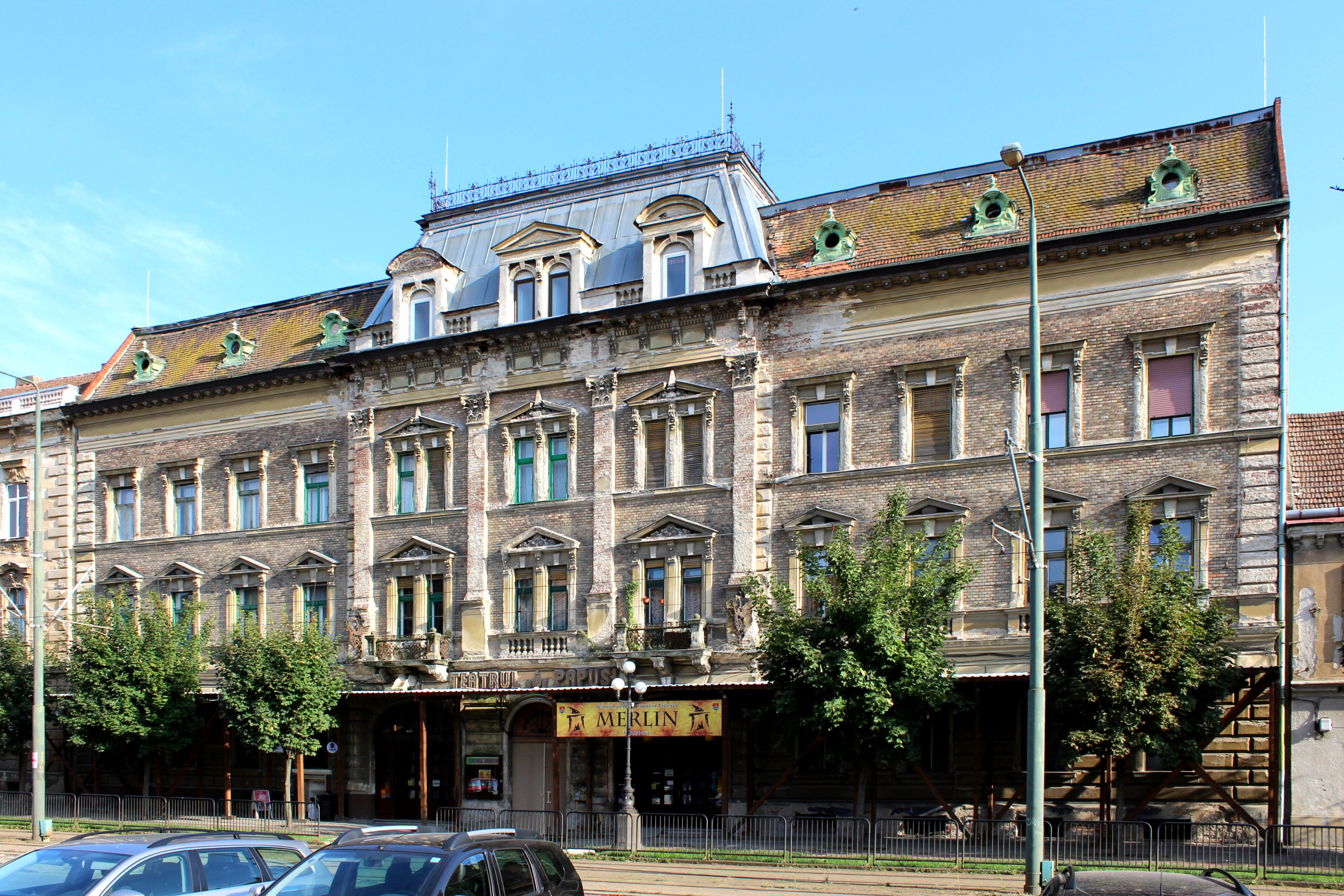
- Formation: 30 April 1949
- Type: Theatre group
- Purpose: Children's theatre
- Location: Timișoara, Romania
- Coordinates: 45.7457802°N 21.2117982°E
- Artistic director: Laurențiu Pleșa
- Website: www.teatrul-merlin.ro

The Merlin Children's and Youth Theatre (Romanian: Teatrul pentru Copii și Tineret „Merlin”) is a children's and puppet theatre in Timișoara, Romania. It is housed in the János Kassay Palace, a building in an eclectic historicist neo-baroque style completed in 1898.

Merlin currently has various shows in its repertoire, such as The Bear Tricked by the Fox, The Little Match Girl, Snow White, The Snow Queen, The Goat and Her Three Kids, Sleeping Beauty, but also Serbian-language performances and shows for young people, such as The Red Shoes and Prince Charming of the Tear. Merlin organizes over 200 shows annually, watched by about 20,000 spectators.

The Merlin theatre hosts two international festivals: the International Animation Festival "Under Merlin's Wand" and the "One Day Festival."

== History ==
In 1945, Timișoara hosted its first puppet show, Fetița pădurii, by Nell Cobar and Sadi Rudeanu. The puppet theatre was then a section of the Timișoara State Theatre and was named after the famous folk character Pipăruș-Petru.

The theatre was established as the Timișoara Puppet Theatre on 30 April 1949, making it one of the first puppet theatres in Romania. Founded by director Florica Teodoru, it gathered a group of students to form the first puppetry troupe in western Romania, staging adaptations and dramatizations of Romanian fairy tales. Initially, the Puppet Theatre was part of the Timișoara State Theatre, but it became an independent institution in 1954. In 1956, after acquiring its own headquarters in a historic building on King Carol I Boulevard, the theatre expanded its performances, soon gaining national recognition.

In 1996, the institution came under the authority of the Timiș County Council, and in 2000, it was granted the title of Merlin Children's and Youth Theatre, expanding its reach.
