= Júlia Gusztinyi =

Júlia Gusztinyi (born? — died 1849, Cluj) was a Hungarian actress and opera singer who had a prominent stage career in Eastern Europe during the 1840s. She mainly portrayed roles from the soubrette repertoire and other lighter roles for soprano. She made her debut as an actress at the National Theatre, Budapest in 1840, and was active at that theatre during the early 1840s in plays and operas. For part of her career, she was a member of theatre impresario József Szákfy's company of actors. She appeared in theatres in Subotica (1844), Oradea (1845), Zrenjanin (1847), and Cluj (1848–1849). She was married in Cluj shortly before her death there in 1849. Her stage repertoire included the roles of Gianetta in Donizetti's L'elisir d'amore, Marie in Donizetti's The Daughter of the Regiment, and Zsuzsi in Ede Szigligeti's A rab, szerző among other roles. ·
