= German Cultural Centre Timișoara =

Cultural organization in Cetate, Timișoara, Romania

The German Cultural Centre Timișoara (German: Deutsches Kulturzentrum Temeswar; Romanian: Centrul Cultural German Timișoara) is located at 2 Augustin Pacha Street, in the Cetate district of the western Romanian city of Timișoara. The Centre was founded in 2002 as a public-private partnership between the Federal Foreign Office and the Robert Bosch Foundation. The local sponsor is the Romanian-German Cultural Society.

== History ==
The Romanian-German Cultural Society was founded by 17 public figures in January 2001, with the aim of creating a German Cultural Centre for Timișoara and the surrounding areas. The president of the cultural society is Elke Sabiel, the former director of the Friedrich Ebert Foundation in Romania, while the cultural centre itself is managed by Alina Baciu.

The Romanian-German Cultural Society faced financial difficulties when the Robert Bosch Foundation withdrew as the main sponsor and the cultural centres in Romania had to become financially independent. In order to ensure a regular income for the cultural centres, the society has created language course departments and cultural programmes that convey an up-to-date picture of Germany. Other German cultural centres are located in Cluj-Napoca, Brașov, Sibiu and Iași.

The objectives of the Cultural Society and the Cultural Centre are to promote the German language, to convey an up-to-date picture of Germany and to promote German-Romanian relations through exhibitions, readings, concerts and literature. The team is concerned with promoting contacts between people from Germany and Romania, but also between Timișoara and Banat.

The Cultural Centre cooperates locally, nationally and internationally with various partners, German and Romanian cultural and educational institutions, other European cultural centres, municipal and regional institutions, art galleries, foundations and various non-governmental organisations, as well as international partner organizations.

== What the Centre offers ==
The German Cultural Centre Timișoara is divided into three departments: language, library and cultural work. The focus is on the language department where 600 students are enrolled every year. The language department of the German Cultural Centre offers language courses of various difficulty levels as well as the opportunity to take language examinations with a certificate at the Goethe-Institut Bucharest. The language department ensures the cultural centre a certain degree of financial independence through a regular income.

The library offers an up-to-date selection of books, journals and audiovisual media in German in a various number of subject areas, such as culture, arts, history, geography, philosophy, German language, German-language literature with a focus on the 20th and 21st centuries, society and economy. The children's library offers an extensive repertoire of books and a various number of board games. The teaching materials centre is a department of the library specially created for educational purposes. It has a large selection of literature on the methodology and the didactics of teaching German, including textbooks, study kits and videos developed by the Goethe Institut. The centre also provides a reading corner and a PC workstation with Internet access.

In addition to organizing its own projects, the cultural department also participates in major events in Timișoara. It organizes exhibitions, concerts, readings by German-speaking authors, film and theater performances, seminars and lectures, as well as workshops for German learners. The events are usually bilingual and take place not only in the cultural centre, but also outside the building. The German Cultural Centre participates regularly in the organization of major cultural events in Timișoara, such as festivals, exhibitions and concerts.

== See also ==
- German State Theatre Timișoara
