= Romanian National Opera, Timișoara =

Public opera and ballet institution in Timișoara, Romania

Coordinates: 45°45′15″N 21°13′33″E

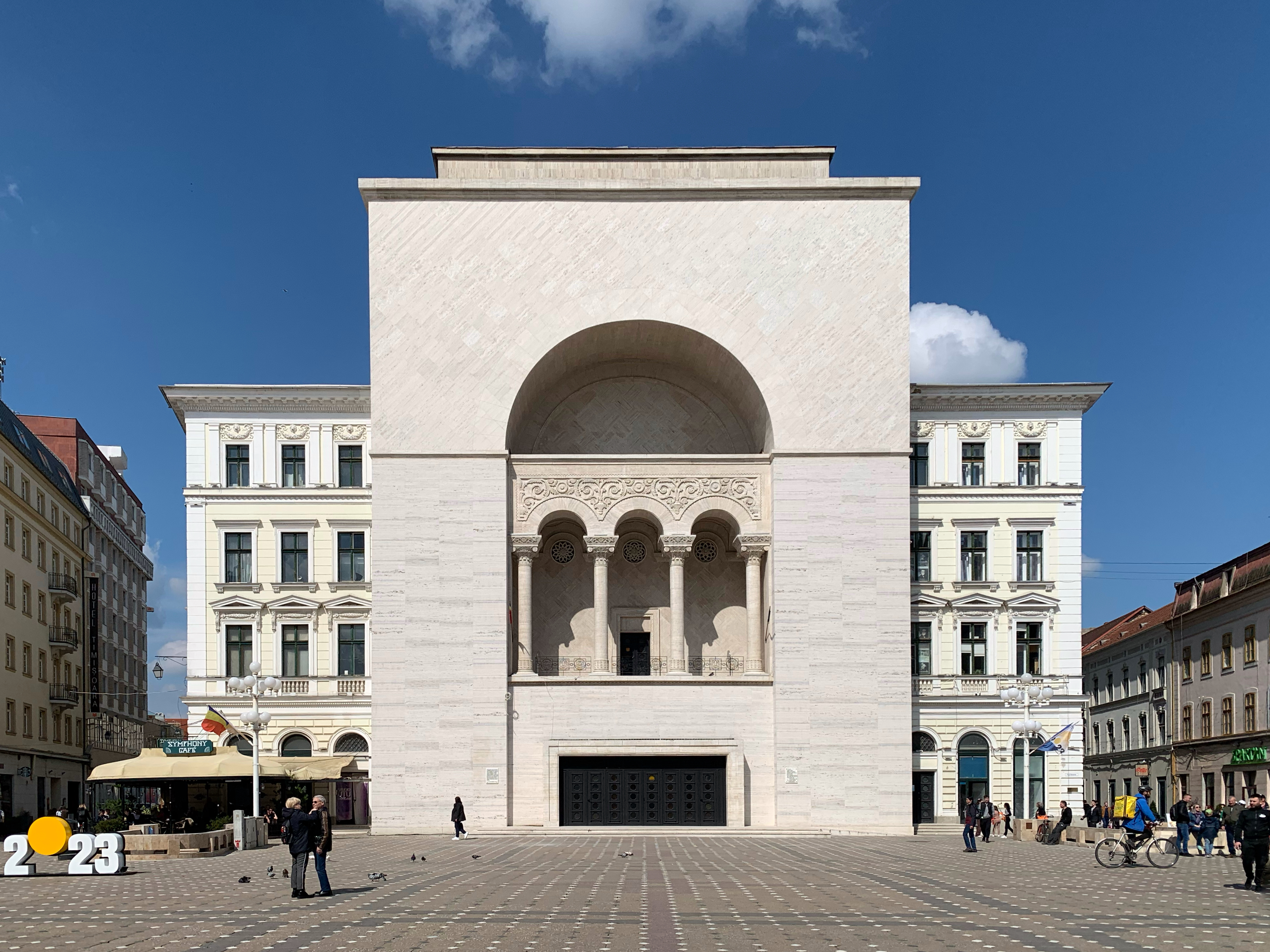
The building of the Romanian Opera and the National Theatre in 2023

The Romanian National Opera (Romanian: Opera Națională Română) is a public opera and ballet institution in Timișoara, Romania. Subordinated to the Ministry of Culture, it is one of the four national opera companies of Romania. The Romanian National Opera was established by royal decree no. 254 of 30 March 1946, issued by King Michael I. The first director of the opera was Aca de Barbu. The Opera shares the same building with the Mihai Eminescu National Theatre, the Csiky Gergely Hungarian State Theatre and the German State Theatre.

== History ==
The Romanian Opera in Timișoara was established by royal decree no. 254 of 30 March 1946, issued by King Michael I. The management of the newly established institution was entrusted to the famous soprano Aca de Barbu, who managed to form a valuable team of musicians. The inaugural performance of the Romanian Opera in Timișoara took place on 27 April 1947 with the opera Aida by Giuseppe Verdi. The first opera performance was transmitted through megaphones in the then Opera Square and was attended by Prime Minister Petru Groza, among others. In the first ten years after its establishment, 41 opera, operetta and ballet performances were staged. Starting from 1952, the Opera held uninterrupted micro-seasons in Arad, Lugoj, Bocșa, Ciacova, Deva, Hunedoara and Reșița, until 1990. At the same time, from 1953, tours were organized around the country.

At the initiative of musician Nicolae Boboc, conductor and director of the Romanian Opera in Timișoara, and Ion Românu, director of the Banatul Philharmonic, in the 1968/1969 season the first edition of the Timișoara Muzicală Festival took place. After the 6th edition, the festival became annual, and from 1993 it received an international character, preserved until today.

A premiere was made on 23 June 1964 – the first live television transmission of a whole opera, with the performance of Verdi's Un ballo in maschera. Numerous radio and television prints followed, as well as on disc and CD.

On 24 September 2004, the Romanian Opera in Timișoara was awarded the title of national opera.

== Directors ==
- Aca de Barbu (1946–1954)
- Francisc Kádár (1954–1956)
- Lucian Gropșianu (1956–1959)
- Viorel Covăsală (1959–1960)
- Adrian Beldi (1960–1963)
- Nicolae Boboc (1963–1974)
- Cornelia Voina (1974–1977)
- Petru Manzur (1977–1983)
- Ion Iancu (1983–1985, 1990, 1994–2000)
- Maria Mărgineanu (1985–1990)
- Virgil Bosa (1990–1994)
- Corneliu Murgu (2000–2019)
- Cristian Rudic (2019–present)

== See also ==
- List of concert halls
- List of opera houses
- List of places in Timișoara
- Opera in Romania
