= Festival of the Hearts =

Festival of the Hearts Festivalul Inimilor
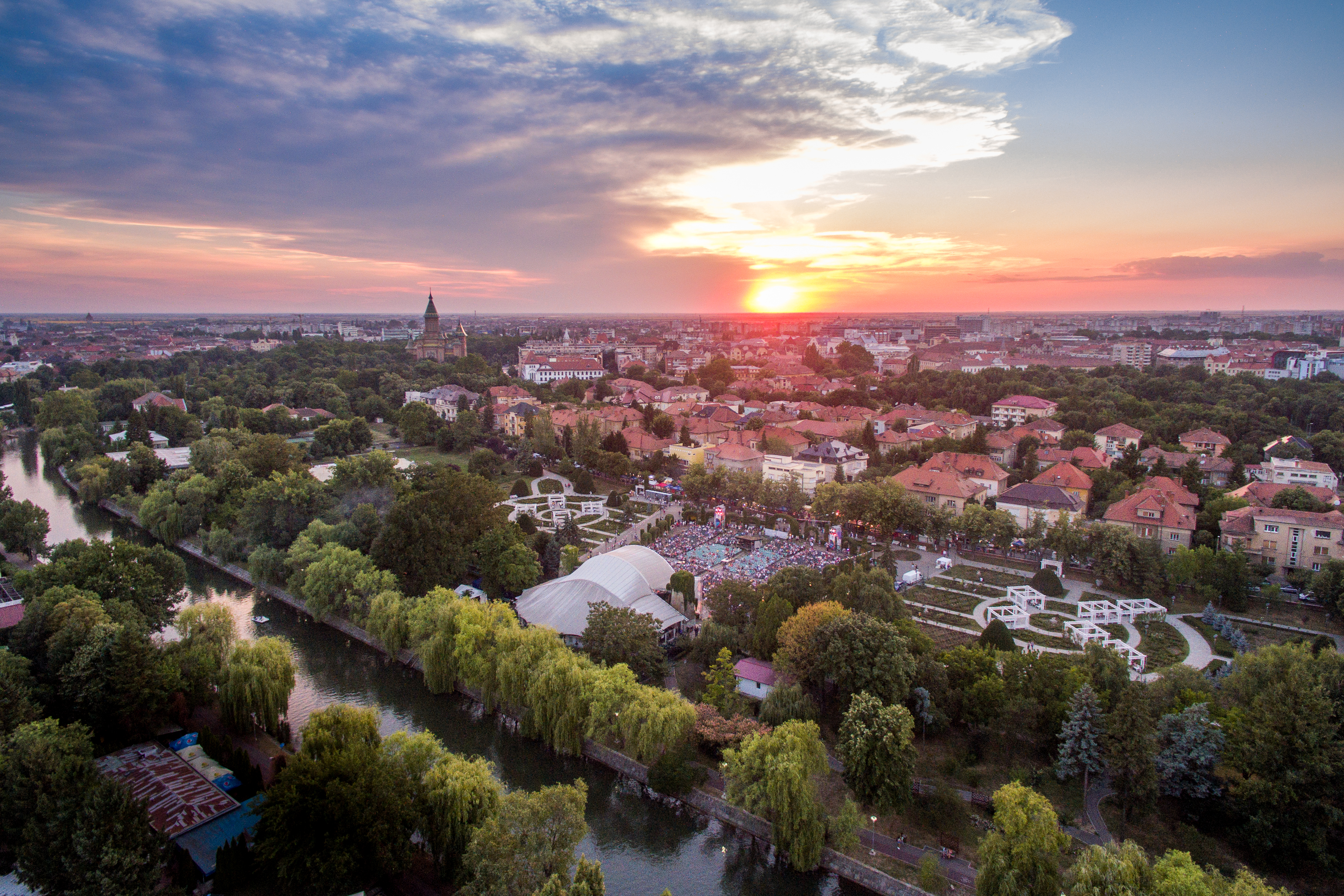
- Status: Active
- Genre: Festival
- Date: July
- Frequency: Annually
- Venue: Roses Park (main stage); Banat Village Museum (second stage)
- Locations: Timișoara, Romania
- Years active: 1990–present
- Most recent: 2–6 July 2025
- Participants: 35 ensembles from 14 countries (2025)
- Organizer: Timișoara City Hall

The Festival of the Hearts (Romanian: Festivalul Inimilor) is an international folklore event held annually in Timișoara, Romania. Established in 1990, the festival unites folklore ensembles from around the world to celebrate and promote intangible cultural heritage. Featuring dance, music, and parade performances, the event serves as a vibrant platform for cultural exchange and the showcasing of folk traditions. With a focus on international participation and cultural diversity, the festival plays a key role in fostering intercultural connections and preserving folk customs.

It is organized by the city culture house and was inaugurated to commemorate the heroes of the 1989 Romanian revolution. The festival program features participation from at least 12 countries across five days in Timișoara. The Festival of the Hearts is the first Romanian event to be included in the CIOFF calendar, operating under the patronage of UNESCO.

== Editions ==
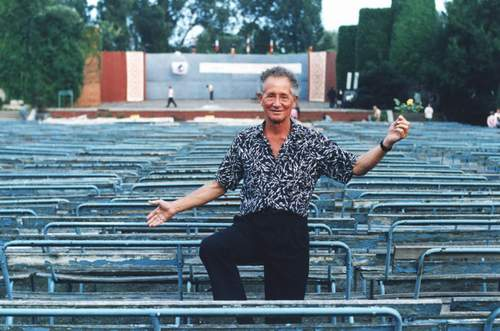
CIOFF President Henri Coursaget at the first edition of the Festival of the Hearts in 1990

Edition	Date	Countries represented	Ref.
20	1–5 July 2009	Georgia; Germany; Hungary; Macedonia; Mexico; Netherlands; Serbia; Tahiti; Turkey	
21	7–11 July 2010	Costa Rica; Greece; Hungary; Macedonia; Netherlands; Serbia; Turkey; Ukraine	
22	6–10 July 2011	Bulgaria; Ecuador; France; Georgia; Hungary; Mexico; Serbia; Slovakia; Turkey	
23	4–8 July 2012	Bulgaria; Hungary; Indonesia; Ireland; Mexico; Serbia; Tunisia; Turkey; Ukraine	
24	10–14 July 2013	Bulgaria; Georgia; Greece; Hungary; Indonesia; Mexico; Serbia; Turkey	
25	9–13 July 2014	Bosnia and Herzegovina; Bulgaria; Georgia; Hungary; India; Macedonia; Mexico; Moldova; Serbia; Taiwan; Turkey; Ukraine; United States	
26	8–12 July 2015	Bulgaria; Colombia; Georgia; Hungary; Macedonia; Mexico; Moldova; Russia; Serbia; Slovakia; Turkey; United States	
27	6–10 July 2016	Bulgaria; Chile; Colombia; Costa Rica; Hungary; Moldova; Serbia; Slovakia; Sri Lanka; Turkey; Ukraine	
28	5–9 July 2017	Argentina; Belarus; Bulgaria; Colombia; Georgia; Poland; Portugal; Puerto Rico; Serbia; Spain; Turkey	
29	4–8 July 2018	Bulgaria; Georgia; Hungary; Italy; Mexico; Serbia; Slovakia; Spain; Turkey; Ukraine	
30	3–7 July 2019	Bulgaria; Colombia; Georgia; Hungary; India; Indonesia; Moldova; Serbia; Spain; Switzerland; Turkey	
31	6–10 July 2022	Bulgaria; Croatia; Georgia; Greece; Italy; Mexico; Peru; Poland; Serbia; Turkey	
32	5–9 July 2023	Bulgaria; China; Georgia; Greece; Hungary; Italy; Moldova; Panama; Serbia; Spain; Tahiti; Turkey	
33	3–7 July 2024	Brazil; Bulgaria; Colombia; Georgia; Mexico; Moldova; Northern Ireland; Poland; Portugal; Serbia; South Korea; Ukraine	
34	2–6 July 2025	Argentina; Bulgaria; China; Georgia; Greece; North Macedonia; Paraguay; Poland; Serbia; Spain; Slovakia; Slovenia; Thailand	
35	1–5 July 2026	Albania; Bulgaria; Colombia; Czech Republic; Georgia; Hungary; Moldova; Serbia; Slovakia; Spain; Ukraine; United States	

== Nominations and awards ==
Year	Awards	Category	Result	Ref.
2024	European Festival Awards	Best Small Festival	Nominated	
