= Parța Neolithic Sanctuary =

- Location within Romania
- 45.62361°N 21.113889°E
- Type: Shrine
- Periods: Neolithic
- Location: Parța
- Region: Romania

Parța Neolithic Sanctuary refers to an excavated Neolithic cult-centre or shrine located on the right bank of the Timiș River at Parța, south of Timișoara, in Romania.

== Description ==
The sanctuary has been dated to around 5000 BC and is considered part of the Vinča culture. It is part of a wider complex of buildings and domestic settlement. The sanctuary building had raised altar-like pedestals and life-size figurine heads together with specially built granary areas. Statues consisted of large clay humanoid figures. A life-sized sculpture of a double-headed goddess stood near the entrance. One of the smaller humanoid figures has horns. The finds strongly suggest a local bull-cult, as bull's horns are present everywhere in the sanctuary, and cattle skulls were placed on a clay platform.

Finds from the excavations, together with a reconstruction of the sanctuary, can be found in the Museum of Banat in Timișoara.

== Gallery ==
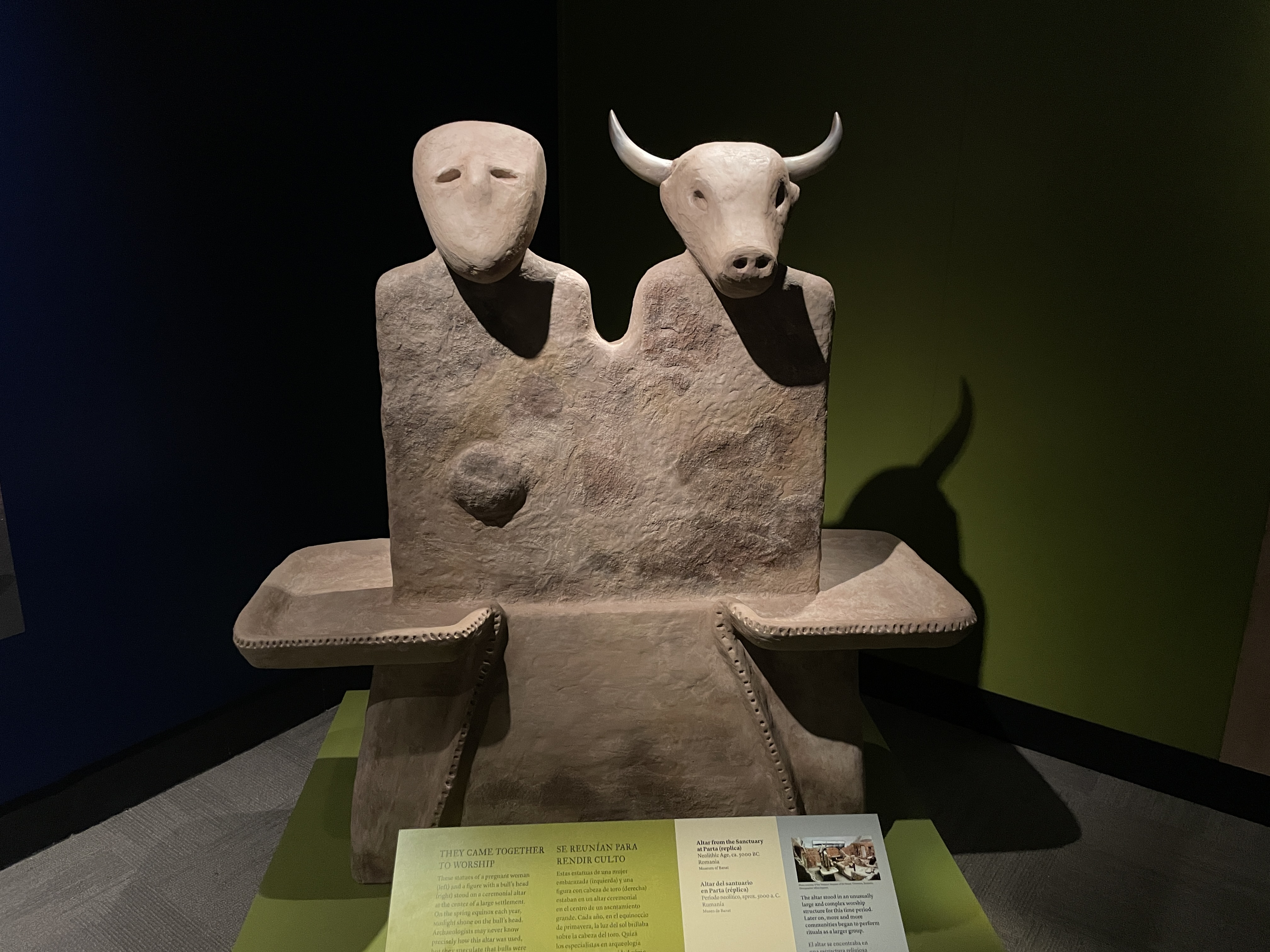
Reconstruction of an altar at the Parța Sanctuary
