= Bajza =

Bajza is a surname. Notable people with the surname include:

- Jozef Ignác Bajza (1755–1836), Slovak writer, satirist, and Catholic priest
- József Bajza (1804–1858), Hungarian poet and critic
- Pavol Bajza (born 1991), Slovak footballer
