= Roses Park, Timișoara =

Urban park in Timișoara, Romania

Roses Park
- Parcul Rozelor
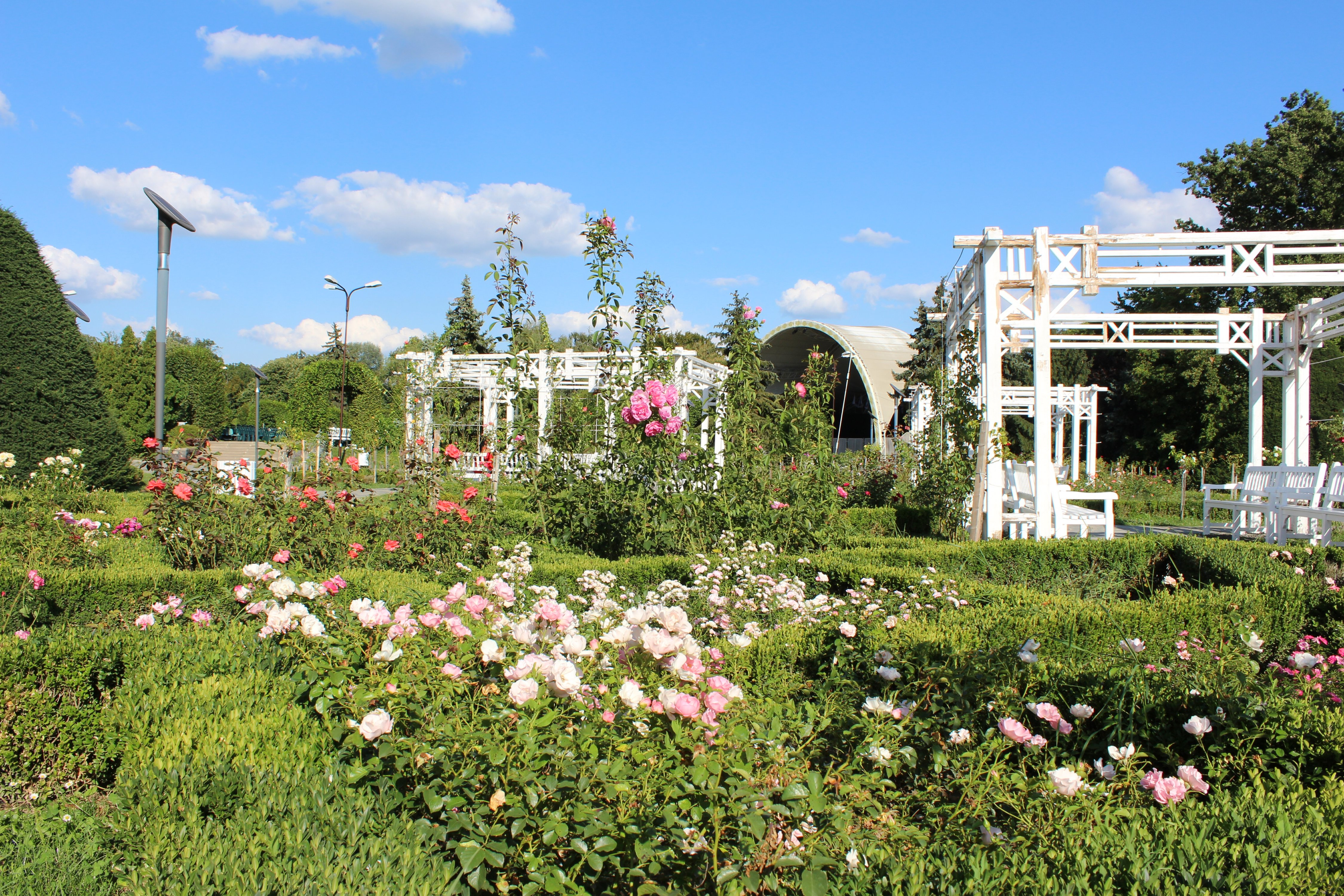
- Interactive map of Roses Park
- Type: Urban park
- Location: Timișoara, Romania
- Coordinates: 45°45′0″N 21°13′55″E
- Area: 3.749 ha
- Established: 1891
- Designer: Árpád Mühle
- Administrator: Timișoara City Hall
- Species: 400 varieties of roses (1,200 in total)
- Facilities: Open-air theater

Roses Park (Romanian: Parcul Rozelor), previously known as Rosarium or Ștefan Plavăț Park of Culture and Leisure, is an urban park in Timișoara, located north of the Bega River. It is regarded as one of the city's landmarks and is also part of why Timișoara is known by the nickname "City of Roses."

== Name ==
Throughout its history, the park has undergone several name changes. Shortly after its inauguration, it was named in honor of Emperor Franz Joseph. Following World War I, it was renamed Rosarium. Until the end of World War II, it carried the name Queen Marie Rosarium. After the war, it was dedicated to Romanian communist activist Ștefan Plavăț and designated as the Park of Culture and Leisure. Today, it is known as Roses Park.

== History ==
The park was established and opened in 1891 on the occasion of the Agro-Industrial Exhibition in Southern Hungary. The floral arrangements were made by gardeners Wilhelm Mühle, Franz Niemetz and Benő Agátsy and were also visited by Emperor Franz Joseph. The park bore the emperor's name, but after World War I it was renamed Rosarium. The landscaping of the park started in 1929 by landscapers Árpád Mühle, Wilhelm Mühle's son, and Mihai Demetrovici, the head of the horticulture service in that period. The plan for the future Roses Park was presented on 13 May 1929, at a national congress of rose growers in Romania. The plan was drawn up by Árpád Mühle in the English style, with wide alleys, wooden canopies and round flower beds. The park was arranged between 1929 and 1934, when over 1,200 species and varieties of roses were planted here. The park, initially with an area of 25,170 m^{2}, was maintained until 1938 with the help of the military personnel of the garrison, under the command of Ion Sâmboteanu. After 1938 the park came under the administration of the city.

Shortly before World War II, the summer theater was built. It was destroyed by bombing in the summer of 1944 and was rebuilt after the war, being intended for outdoor performances. Later, academician Alexandru Borza, taking refuge in Cluj-Napoca after the Second Vienna Award with the entire Botanical Institute, tried to set up a botanical garden here, but the project could not be realized.

The last reorganization of the park dates from 2012, when, on an area of over 11,000 m^{2}, the municipality planted 9,024 roses, 428 trees and shrubs and also rebuilt 12 pergolas, 77 benches and 12 Roman vases. A bust of founder Árpád Mühle was placed at the entrance to the park in 2014.

== Design ==
The current area of the park is 37,490 m^{2}, of which lawn, trees and roses occupy 31,890 m^{2}. The design follows a mixed composition, clearly distinguishing the former Rosarium in the central area, which preserves a formal, classical geometric layout, from the remainder of the park, which is arranged in a more naturalistic, free landscape style. The site itself is rectangular. At its center lies a summer theater, encircled by a clipped topiary hedge. On either side of this focal point are two symmetrically positioned rondels planted with roses, set within concentric circular paths that serve as bypass walkways. These rondels are linked to the area surrounding the theater by straight, parallel pathways. Along the paths intersecting the rondels, a total of twelve wooden pergolas are installed. In contrast to this structured geometry, the rest of the park is characterized by winding, irregularly shaped paths that create a more informal, landscape-driven circulation pattern.

== Festivals ==
In the park many cultural events are organized nowadays, such as the Festival of Hearts, the Festival of Ethnic Minorities, the Festival of Opera and Operetta and the Festival of Artisanal Gastronomy.

== Gallery ==
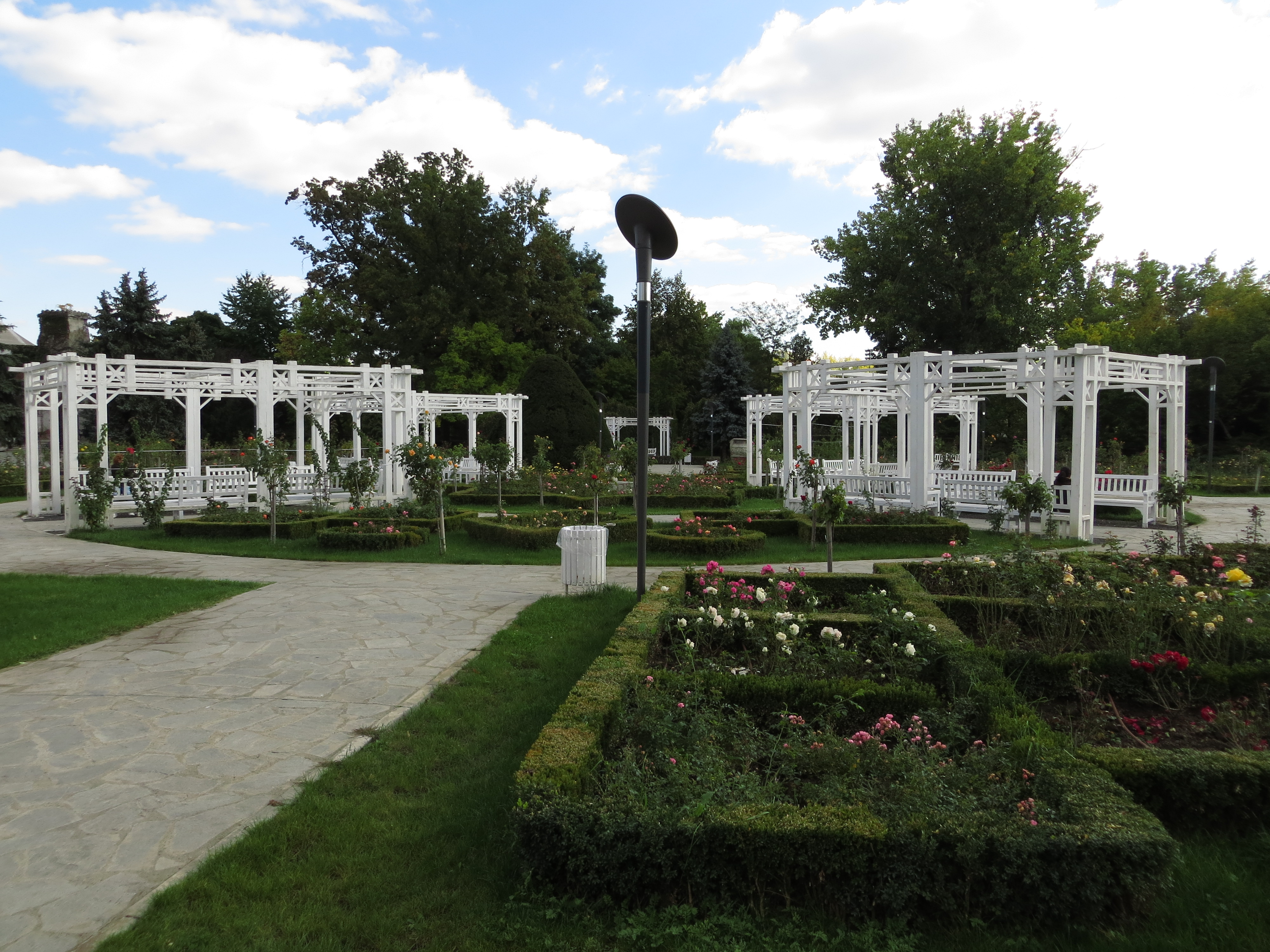
White pergolas in Roses Park

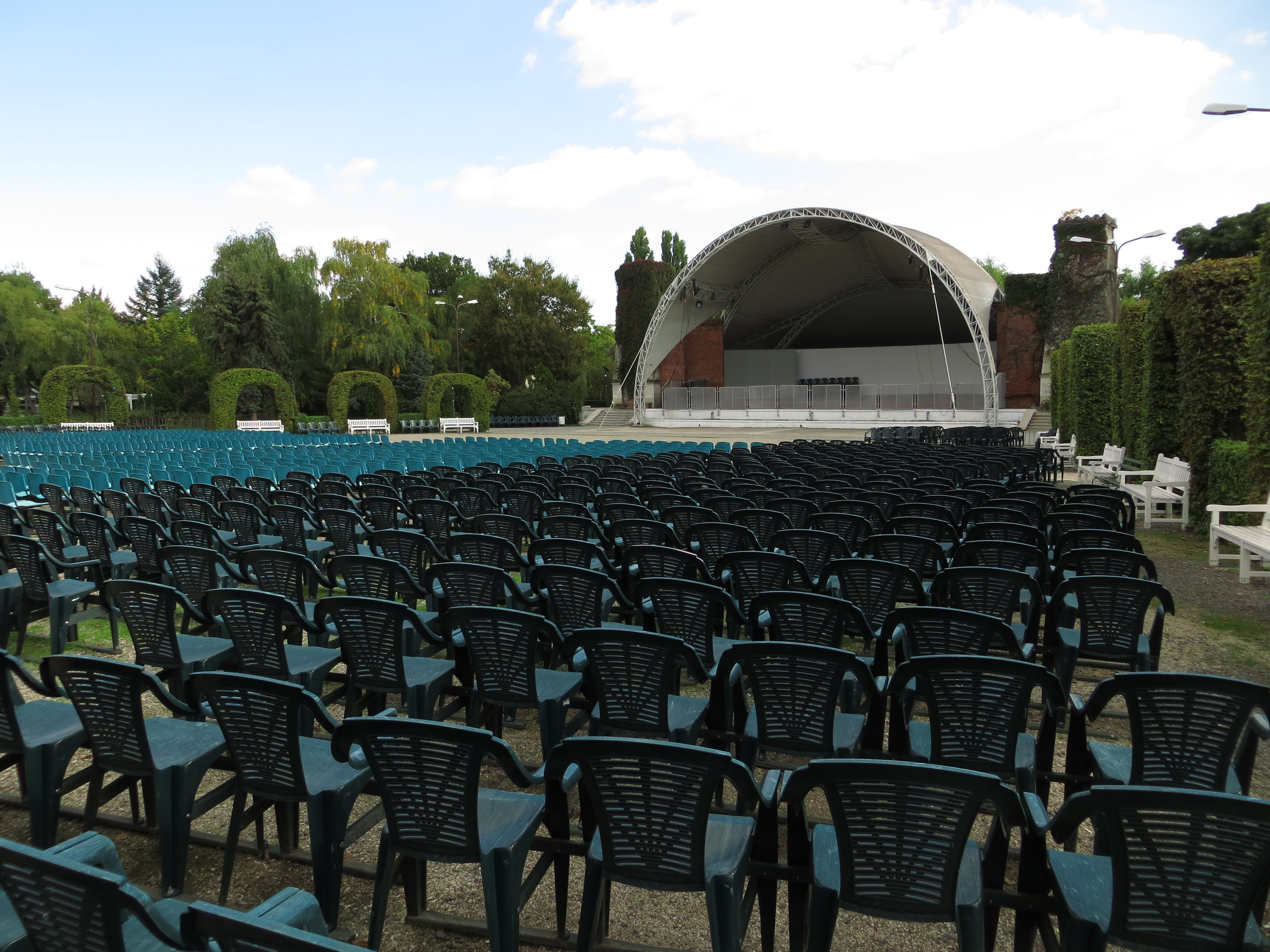
The summer theater

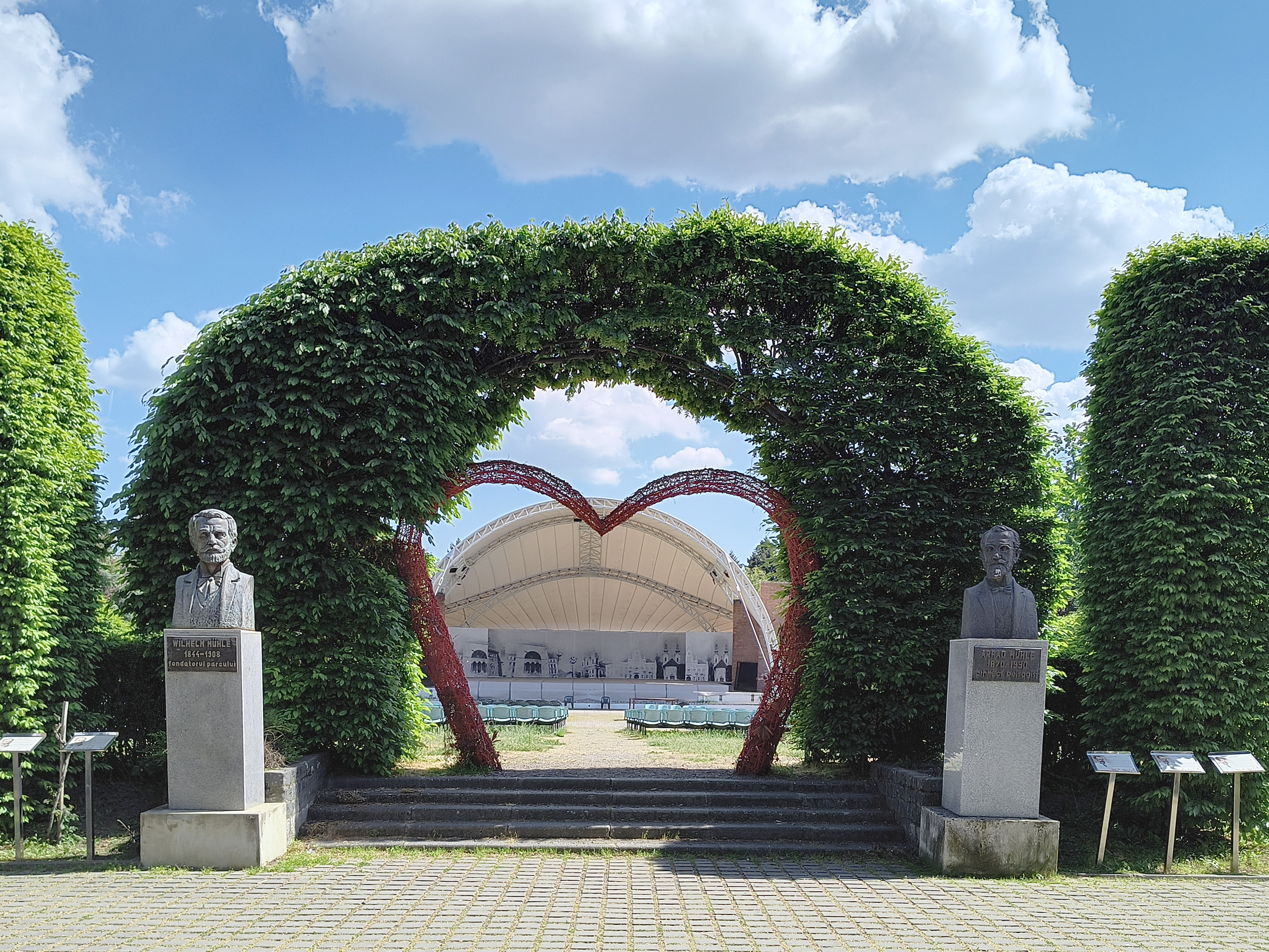
Statues of Wilhelm and Árpád Mühle

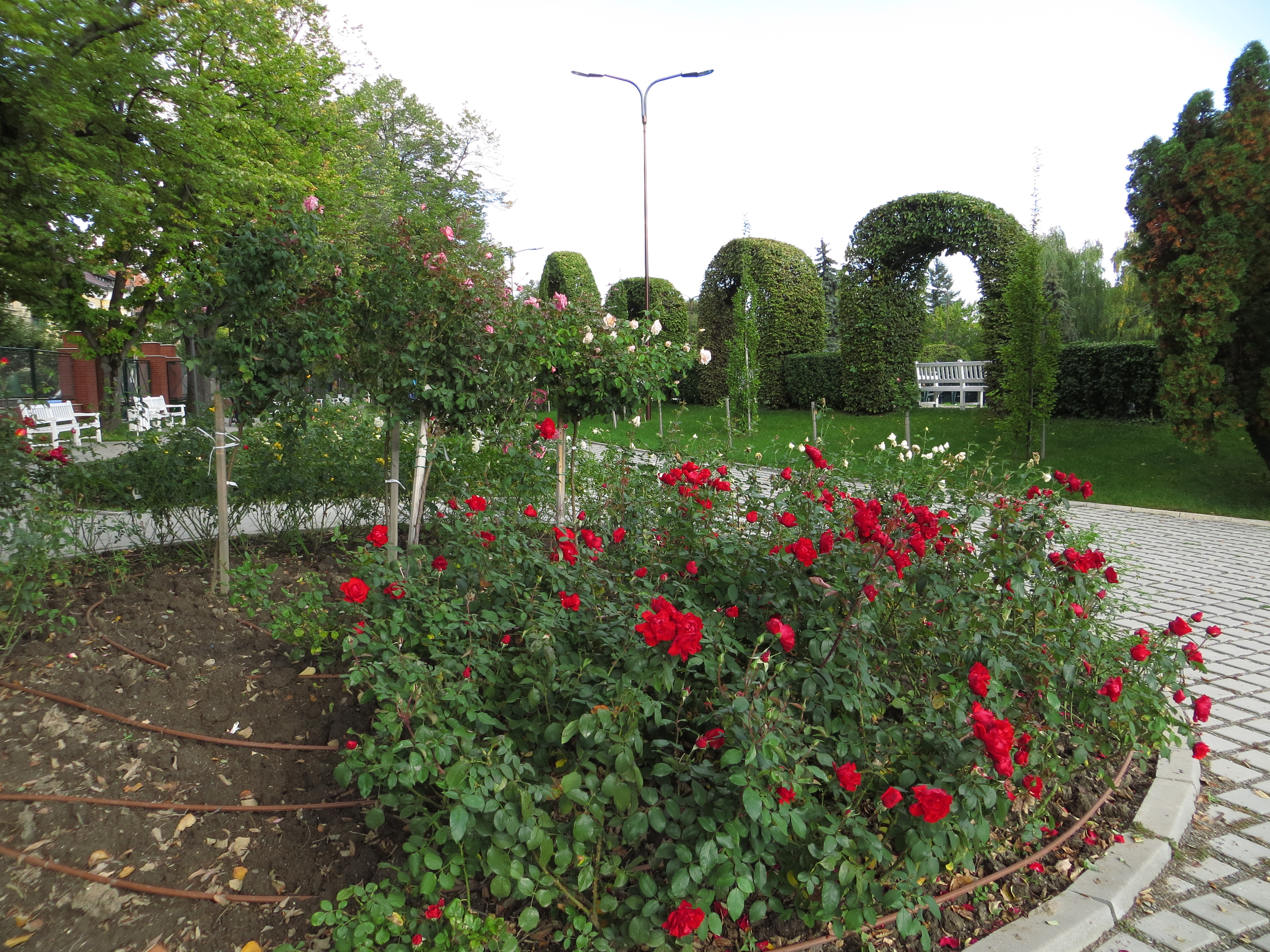
Varieties of red, pink and white roses in Roses Park
