= Huniade Castle =

- Castelul Huniade
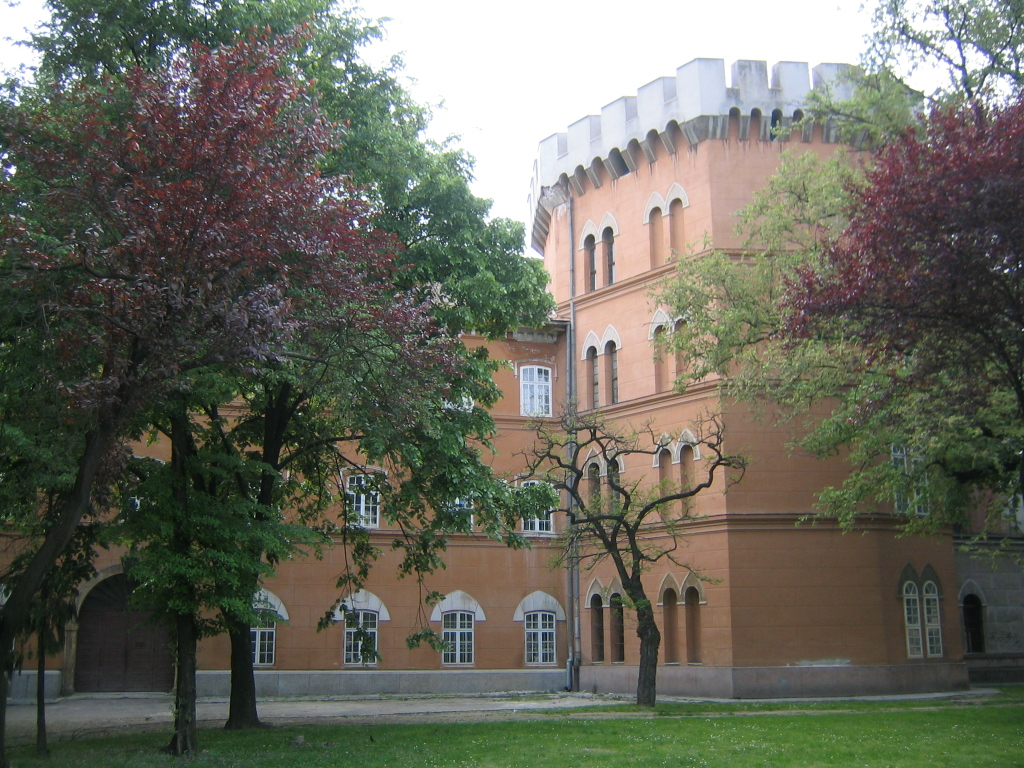
- The Huniade Castle in 2007
- Interactive map of the Huniade Castle area

General information
- Type: Castle
- Architectural style: Romantic, neo-Gothic
- Location: Timișoara, Romania
- Coordinates: 45°45′11″N 21°13′37″E
- Construction started: 1308
- Completed: 1315
- Renovated: 1447, 1856

Design and construction
- Architect: Paolo Santini de Duccio

The Huniade Castle (Romanian: Castelul Huniade; Hungarian: Hunyadi-kastély; German: Schloss Hunyadi) is the oldest monument in Timișoara, Romania, built between 1443 and 1447 by John Hunyadi and Paolo Santini de Duccio over the old royal castle dating from the 14th century (built during the reign of Charles I Robert). The castle was rebuilt by the Turkish pashas in the 17th century and by Prince Eugene of Savoy in the 18th century. The structure owes its present appearance to the 1850s reconstruction campaign. It houses the History, Archeology and Natural Sciences sections of the National Museum of Banat.

== History ==
=== Old castle ===
The construction of the current Huniade Castle began in the 14th century, after a visit by King Charles I Robert to Timișoara in 1307. He chose to settle here after the old royal residence became unsafe, due to ongoing conflicts with a faction of the Hungarian nobility that was hostile toward him. The construction was probably carried out by Italian builders on an older edifice and most likely finished in 1315, because in 1316 the king was already settled in his new castle.

Tradition holds that King Charles I Robert, skilled in architecture, personally designed the castle's plans. The stone was reportedly brought from the Vršac Castle, the timber from the surrounding forests, and the sand from the waters of the Timiș River. As the ground was quite unstable, the builders strengthened the foundations by driving oak trunks into the soil, binding them together, and filling the gaps with crushed materials until a solid platform was created on which the fortress walls were then erected.

The building developed around a quadrangular courtyard with cylindrical corner towers. Being located on an island, it was connected to the city of Timișoara, also fortified by the same king, through a movable bridge. It followed the Venetian model, with oak pillars driven into the ground. After almost eight years, the castle was damaged by an earthquake and, implicitly, the king had to leave it. It underwent major renovations during Count Pippo Spano. After extensive research, the original foundation was found 40 cm below the pavement of the current castle.

=== New castle ===
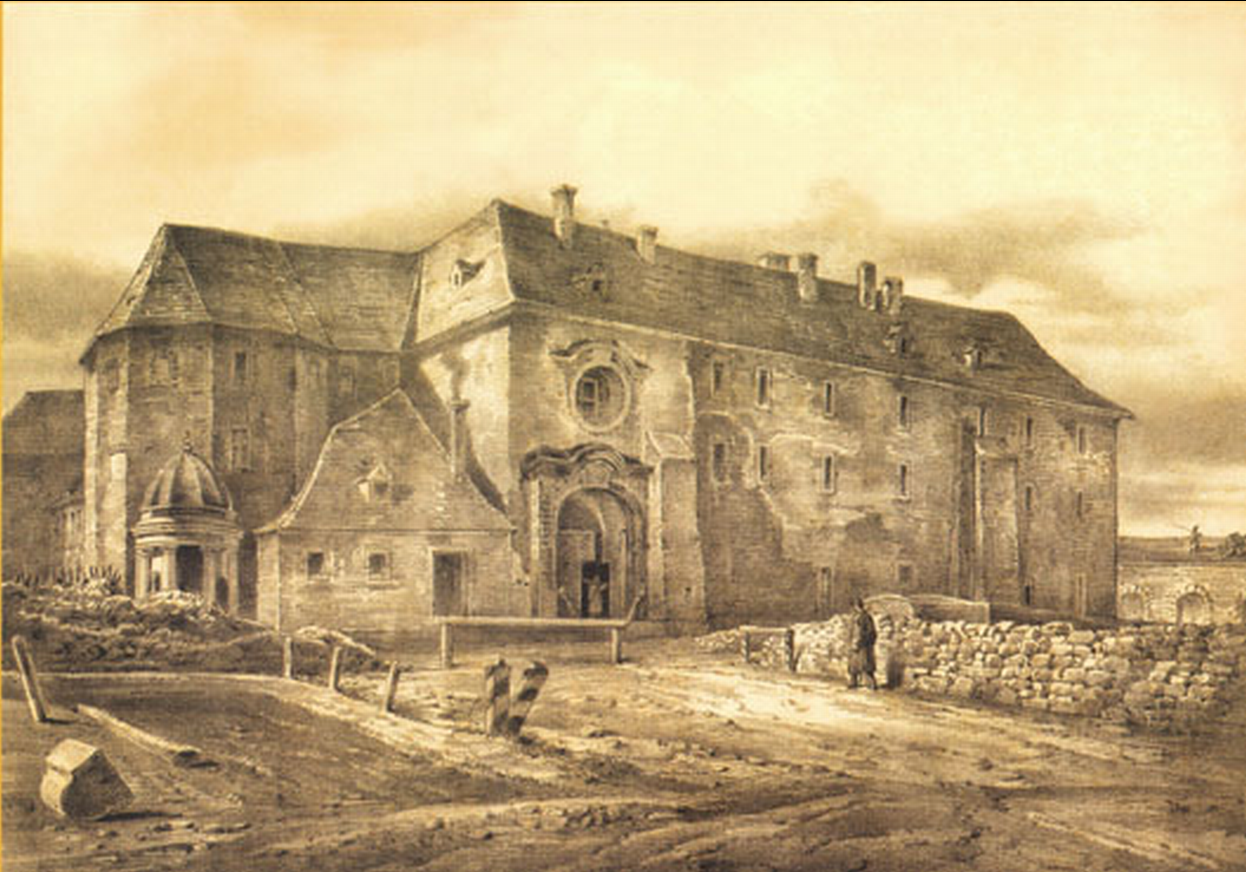
Lithography of Huniade Castle around 1730 (National Museum of Banat)

The castle later became the favored residence of the renowned Florentine condottiero Filippo Scolari, Count of Timiș during the reign of King Sigismund of Luxembourg. Scolari rebuilt and adorned the castle in the Renaissance style, employing Italian craftsmen and artists. A new extension was later added by John Hunyadi, who had served as Scolari's apprentice and squire in his youth. After being appointed Count of Timiș, John established his residence in the Timișoara citadel. Following a powerful earthquake in 1443, he rebuilt and expanded both the castle and its fortifications based on the designs of Italian architect Paolo Santini da Duccio, leaving no trace of the original Angevin structure. In 1455, King Ladislaus V the Posthumous formally granted him the Timișoara fortress, which remained in the family's possession until the death of Matthias Corvinus in 1490.

Both the castle and its fortifications were equipped with semicircular towers adapted to artillery. It served as the noble residence for all the kings who stayed in Timișoara until 1552. During the Ottoman occupation (1552–1716), it served as the residence of the beylerbeys of the Eyalet of Temeşvar. The palisade around the castle, built of oak poles and earth, dates from this period.

=== Reconstruction ===
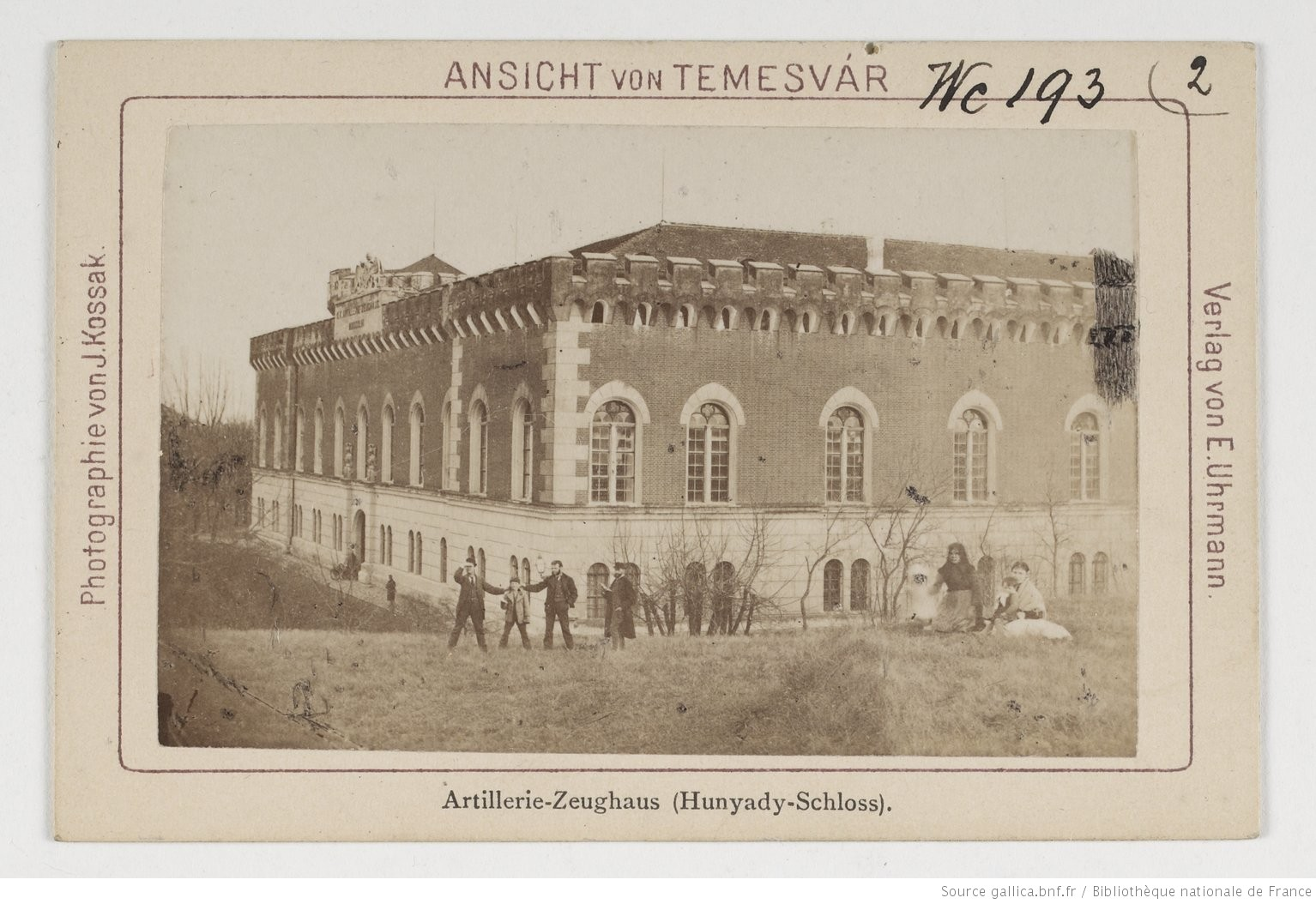
The Huniade Castle in 1880. At that time, the castle was an artillery barracks.

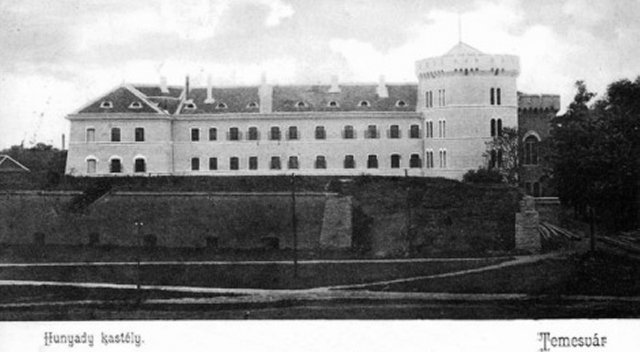
Castle Bastion of Timișoara Citadel and Huniade Castle around 1900

Due to the siege of the imperials, which led to the reconquest of Banat, the castle was damaged, so that after 1716 its renovation was required. But its function was changed, being transformed into an artillery barracks and a military warehouse (Provienthaus).

In 1849, the Hungarian revolutionaries, besieging Timișoara, destroyed the castle from its foundations, to the point where a reconstruction of the edifice was needed. The reconstruction and renovation work was finished in 1856. However, the main facade of the castle was modified, this time being made in a romantic style. Between 1919 and 1947, the Banat Barracks (Romanian: Cazarma Bănățeană), as it was known then, was the headquarters of the 7th Pioneers' Regiment and the 6th Heavy Artillery Regiment.

Since 1947, the castle has been home to the National Museum of Banat. In front of the castle there are two lanterns reminding in several languages that Timișoara was the first city in Europe to introduce electric public lighting in 1884.

== Architecture ==
Despite the many changes, the castle kept its organization around a quadrangular courtyard, the position of the donjon and the "Hall of the Knights", details that can also be found at the Corvin Castle in Hunedoara. The main facade was redone in a romantic style. The windows, finished in a full arch but with neo-Gothic decoration above, took the place of the holes for the artillery pieces, and the facade was made in apparent brick. The first floor, built on the height of two normal stories, contains two vaulted rooms in neo-Gothic style, one with three naves and the other with two, which are built of brick and supported by a row of massive columns. The upper part of the facade is crenellated, which gives it a fortress appearance. The two ends of the main facade are provided with risalti, the corners of which are accentuated by a plaster imitation of the constructive stone system.

The castle tower is rectangular in shape, low in height, with small windows and decorated with crenellations at the upper end so that the roof is not visible. The main entrance has been modified and is flanked by two massive pilasters that each have a collection of weapons specific to the Middle Ages at the top that contribute to the Gothic aspect of the castle.

== Archeological research ==
The castle has only been systematically researched since 2007. Then a 4-meter deep fountain built between the 15th–16th centuries and an 11-meter tall medieval tower made of brick and mortar, located inside the castle, were discovered. The tower served as a home, but also as a refuge in case of a siege. Other researches were made in 1903, with the occasion of brace works needed at that time, when the ruins of the 14th century medieval castle were discovered for the first time. In 1980, archeologist Alexandru Rădulescu made surveys in the inner courtyard and in the "Marble Hall", revealing the brick walls dating from 14th–16th centuries.

== See also ==
- Corvin Castle
- List of castles in Romania
