= Mihai Eminescu National Theatre, Timișoara =

Theatre company in Timișoara, Romania,

Coordinates: 45.7542°N 21.2259°E

Mihai Eminescu National Theatre
- Teatrul Național „Mihai Eminescu”
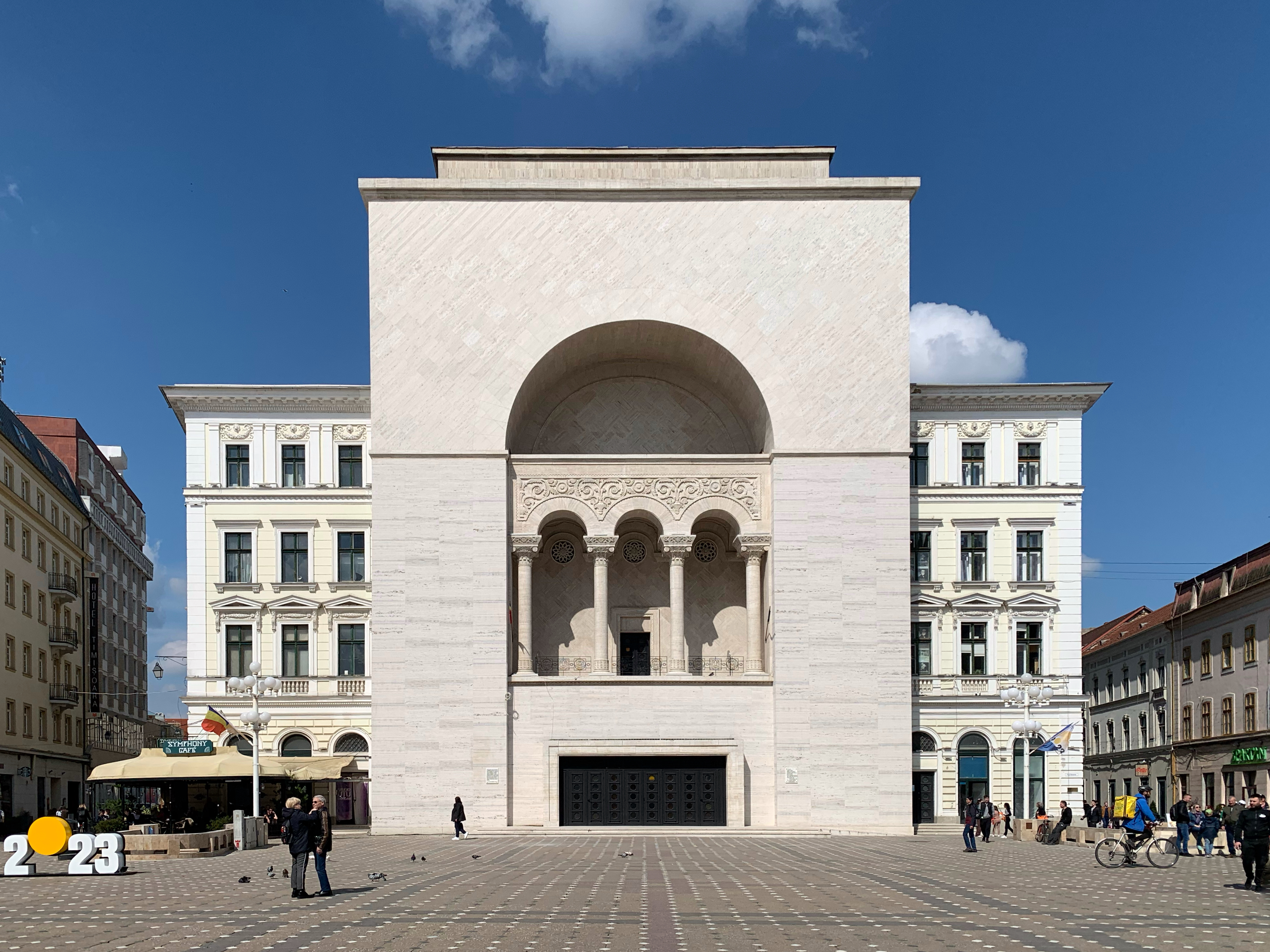
- Formation: 18 October 1945
- Type: Theatre group
- Location: Timișoara
- Artistic director: Ada Hausvater
- Website: ro.tntimisoara.com

The Mihai Eminescu National Theatre (Romanian: Teatrul Național „Mihai Eminescu”; abbreviated TNTm) is a theatre company in Timișoara, Romania, subordinated to the Ministry of Culture. It shares the same building with the Romanian National Opera, the Csiky Gergely Hungarian State Theatre and the German State Theatre. It was founded in 1945 after decades of concerted efforts to establish a Romanian-language theatre in the city.

== History ==
The relatively late establishment of the Romanian theatre in Banat is the result of the precarious social and political conditions of the Romanians within the Austro-Hungarian Empire. In the absence of the right and the possibilities to establish artistic institutions, during this period a rich amateur activity of Romanian "dilettante" troupes flourished. The Society of Dilettantes from Timișoara, made up of 13 members, started its activity in the old districts of the city (Maiere and Fabric). Using the stages of some public places, especially cafes, the performances of Timișoara dilettantes mainly focused on the works of Vasile Alecsandri and some local authors. The first Romanian-language theatre performance presented by a troupe of dilettantes – Fantasma by Ion C. Lerescu – took place on 1 March 1870, in the Fabric suburb, in a room of the Tigrul Hotel in Timișoara. Several tours of professional theatre troupes (1871 – Mihail Pascaly's troupe, 1881–1882 – George Augustin Petculescu's troupe from Lugoj) partially compensated for the lack of a permanent Romanian theatre in Timișoara.

After 1920, until 1945, Timișoara's theatrical activity was characterized by the media struggle for a Romanian theatre in this city (remarkable in this sense being the efforts of writers such as Lucian Blaga, Camil Petrescu or George Călinescu) and the struggle to maintain a permanent theatrical movement through some troupes temporarily established in Timișoara: Leonard-Maximilian Company (in 1920, with permanent premises in Timișoara), Migri Troupe (1922), Craiova National Theatre (January–May 1928), Cluj National Theatre (1940–1945), as well as some touring troupes: Bucharest National Theatre, during several seasons, and Iași National Theatre, under the direction of Ionel Teodoreanu, in 1931. The existence of an amateur theatrical movement, which continues on a different level that of the dilettantes, supported by the formations of the CFR workers' clubs, Prima Banat (shoe factory), the Timișoara electricity company, as well as the student theatre formations within the Polytechnic Institute's faculties, ensured the continuity and maintenance of public interest in theatre.

The first step towards establishing a theatre and an opera house in Timișoara was made on 24 May 1945 through a memorandum addressed to the local office of the National Democratic Front, a memorandum that mentioned the acute need for the existence of professional theatrical institutions with permanent activity. In the summer of the same year, the Local Committee of the United Trade Unions of Timișoara formed the core of the permanent theatre troupe made up of members of the CFR union formation, professional actors, graduates of the Academy of Dramatic Art and Music in Cluj (refugee to Timișoara between 1940 and 1948, after the annexation of Northern Transylvania by Hungary following the Second Vienna Award) and members chosen by competition of theatrical teams from large local companies, graduates of the Workers' Conservatory. The same address expresses the decision to establish a "workers' theater with a drama and comedy section", mentioning that it will be materially supported by the United Trade Unions of Timișoara, as well as by the General Labor Confederation.

On 18 October 1945, by address no. 5621, the Ministry of Arts approved the establishment of the first Romanian professional theatre in Timișoara called the People's Workers' Theatre (Romanian: Teatrul Muncitoresc al Poporului). The Timișoara People's Theatre began its existence before the Bucharest People's Theatre, although it was its subsidiary. It anticipates a form of organization of the Romanian theatrical movement that will last from 1946 to 1949, when all the people's theatres in the country, subsidiaries of the People's Theatre in Bucharest, will become state theatres. The first artistic production of the Timișoara People's Theatre was the revue Ne dați voie by Mircea Avram, Corneliu Indrieșu, Dan Radu Ionescu and Theodor Foale. The official inauguration of the first season takes place on 25 December 1945 with the premiere of the play Ion al Vădanei by Nicolae Kirițescu, directed by Lilly Bulandra, the artistic director of the theatre at the time.

In 1949, the People's Workers' Theatre became the State Theatre of Timișoara. On 30 April 1949, the Puppet Theatre led by Florica Teodoru came into existence as its section. Starting with 1966, the Timișoara State Theatre will be called "Matei Millo", until 1971 when, on its 25th anniversary, it becomes, by decision of the Council of Ministers, the Timișoara National Theatre. In 1995, at its semicentenary, it will receive the name "Mihai Eminescu".

== Directors ==
- Sabin Indrieșu (1945–1947)
- Lilly Bulandra (1947–1948)
- Emil Josan (1948–1953)
- Traian Ghițescu (1953)
- Marin Pârâianu (1954–1955)
- Maxililian Szava (1955)
- Gheorghe Leahu (1956–1973)
- Traian Bunescu (1973–1979)
- Lucia Nicoară (1979–1990)
- Șerban Foarță (1990–1991)
- Vladimir Jurăscu (1991–1994)
- Ioan Ieremia (1994–1997)
- Gheorghe Luchescu (interim, 1997)
- Ștefan Iordănescu (1997–2000)
- Liviu Socaciu (interim, 2000)
- Cornel Ungureanu (2000–2001)
- Lucia Nicoară (2001–2005)
- Miriana Tomici (interim, 2005)
- Ada Hausvater (2005–present)
