= Ede Szigligeti =

Ede Szigligeti (8 March 1814 – 19 January 1878) was a Hungarian dramatist.

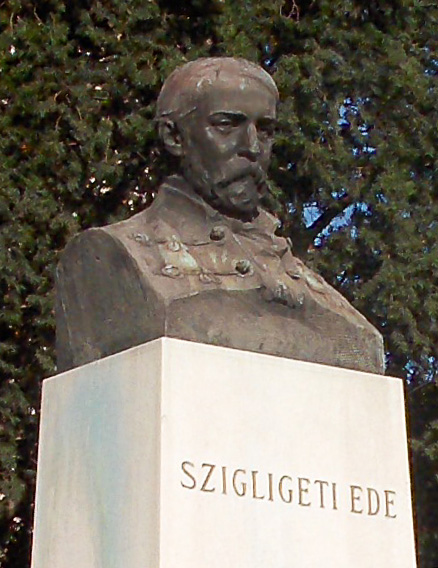
Ede Szigligeti, Oradea, Romania

He was born József Szathmáry, at Nagyvárad-Olaszi (presently Oradea, Romania). His parents would have made him a priest; he wanted to be a great doctor; finally he entered the office of an engineer. But his heart was already devoted to the drama and, on 15 August 1834, despite the prohibition of his tyrannical father, he actually appeared upon the stage at Budapest. His father thereupon forbade lim to bear his name in future, and the younger Szathmary henceforth adopted instead the name of Ede Szigligeti, the hero of one of Sandor Kisfaludy's romances.

He supported himself for the next few years precariously enough, earning as he did little more than twelve florins a month, but at the same time he sedulously devoted himself to the theatre and sketched several plays, which differed so completely from the "original" plays then in vogue (The Played-out Trick actually appeared upon the boards) that they attracted the attention of such connoisseurs as Vorosmarty and Bajza who warmly encouraged the young writer. In 1840 the newly founded Hungarian Academy crowned his five-act drama Rosa, the title-role of which was brilliantly acted by Rosa Laborfalvy, the great actress, who subsequently married Maurus Jokai.

Szigligeti was now a celebrity. In 1840 he was elected a member of the Academy and in 1845 a member of the Kisfaludy Society. He was now the leading Hungarian dramatist. Three of his plays were crowned by the National Theatre and sixteen by the Academy. His verdict on all dramatic subjects was for years regarded as final, and he was the mentor of all the rising young dramatists of the 1860s. During the half-century of his dramatic career Szigligeti wrote no fewer than a hundred original pieces, all of them remarkable for the inexhaustible ingenuity of their plots, their up-to-date technique and the consummate skill with which the author used striking and unexpected effects to produce his denouement. He wrote, perhaps, no work of genius, but he amused and enthralled the Magyar playgoing public for a generation and a half.

Szigligeti's most successful tragedies were Gritti (1844), Paul Beldi (1856), Light's Shadows (1865), Struensee (i&ii), Valeriaa and The Pretender (1868). His tragedies, as a rule, lack pathos and sublimity. Much more remarkable are his comedies. He is a perfect master of the art of weaving complications, and he prefers to select his subjects from the daily life of the upper and upper-middle classes. The best of these comedies are The Three Commands of Matrimony (1850), Tuneful Stevey (1855), Mamma (1857), The Reign of Woman (1862), and especially the farce Young Lilly (1849). He also translated Goethe's Egmont and Shakespeare's Richard III, and wrote a dramaturgical work entitled The Drama and its Varieties. A few of his plays have appeared in German.
