= German State Theatre Timișoara =

German-language theatre in Timişoara, Romania

- Deutsches Staatstheater Temeswar
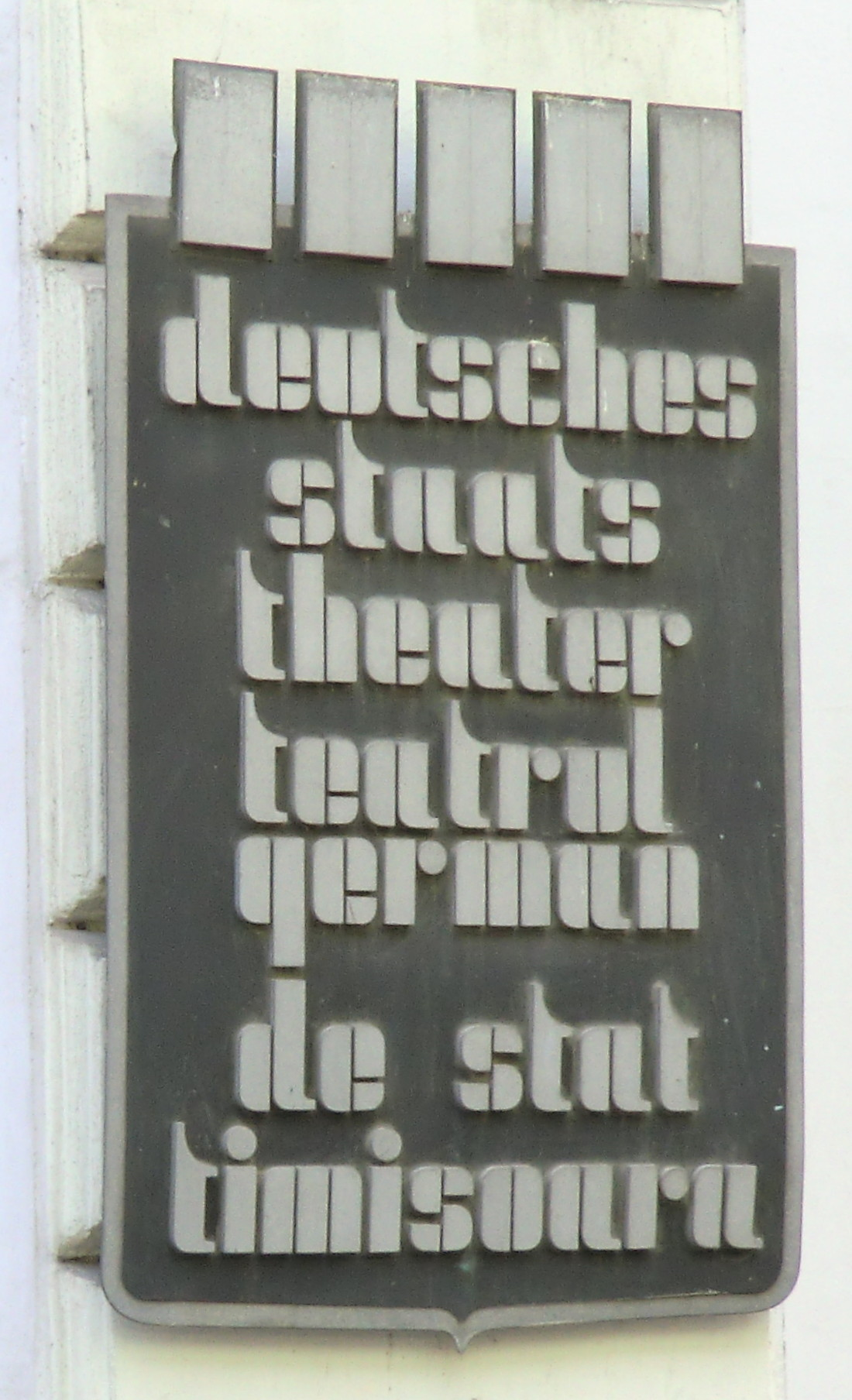
- Formation: 1953
- Type: Theatre group
- Location: Timișoara
- Artistic director: Lucian Vărșăndan
- Website: www.teatrulgerman.ro

The German State Theatre Timișoara (German: Deutsches Staatstheater Temeswar) is a publicly funded German-language theatre company in Timișoara, Romania, where a German-language theatre was first mentioned in 1753. The new theatre opened in 1875, but closed again in 1899 as a result of increasing Magyarization in the then Kingdom of Hungary. The ceremonial reopening of the German State Theatre Timișoara took place on 27 June 1953. The German State Theatre is located in the right wing of the Palace of Culture (former Redouta ballroom) with entrance from Alba Iulia Street. It has a 100-seat theatre hall that it shares with the Hungarian State Theatre.

== History ==
The first mention of German-language actors in Timișoara comes from 1746, and in 1753 the city administration authorizes performances by a touring German theatre troupe between May and October. Five years later, a hall for theatre performances was set up in the former building of the Serbian magistracy (present-day Nikolaus Lenau High School). The building was expanded in 1776 and was set up exclusively for theatre performances. Under the supervision of the city judge Ignaz Koppauer, it was eventually converted into a real theatre building by 1795, with an opening ceremony taking place on 22 November. For the most part, pieces by German classics have been included in the repertoire. The "waltz king" Johann Strauss II often made guest appearances in Timișoara, and in 1796 the first performance of the Magic Flute by Wolfgang Amadeus Mozart took place here. In September 1871 the foundation stone was laid for the new Franz Joseph Theatre, which opened on 22 September 1875, a building dominating the city centre in the Italian Renaissance style designed by the Viennese architects Fellner & Helmer. The theatre building housed the Grand Hotel, a large ballroom known as the Redouta, a luxurious restaurant, a coffee house and, from 1902, a summer garden. However, the theatre had to be completely renovated after a fire in 1880. As a result of Magyarization, the German Theatre in Timisoara was closed in 1899. However, single performances with Viennese troupes took place here up to and including the second decade of the 20th century.

After 1920, occasional German-language theatrical performances took place again in Timișoara, initially with the authorization of the German Cultural Office in Sibiu, then through the German National Theatre in Sibiu, which produced performances that were then held in all areas of the country inhabited by Germans. In 1940 this theatre was taken over by the National Socialist ideology, and before the end of World War II it was dissolved.

The German State Theatre was founded on 1 January 1953 by a decree of the Bucharest Council of Ministers, initially as the German department of the Timișoara State Theatre. The inaugural performance was held on 27 June 1953 with the play Die Karlsschüler by Heinrich Laube. In 1956, the theatre gained administrative independence under the name German State Theatre Timișoara, which it still bears today. Since its foundation, more than 370 productions have been produced, and the theatre has played around 10,000 performances in front of around 2.5 million spectators in almost all German-speaking towns in Romania, as well as in the GDR, and after 1989 in the FRG, in Austria, Poland, Hungary, France, Croatia and Serbia.

The first changes in the organizational status of the German State Theatre Timișoara begin to appear with the establishment of the acting department in German with the support of the Faculty of Music of Theatre of the West University of Timișoara. The initiative proves to be auspicious, so that starting with 1992, the theater staff is enriched quantitatively and qualitatively, the institution now becoming one of the best performing theatres in the theatrical landscape of Romania. The implementation of the headset translation system and surtitles in 2005 led to an increase in the number of non-German-speaking spectators. This is why today, despite the exodus of ethnic Germans from western Romania, the German State Theatre Timișoara has a large audience, mostly young people. Since 2009, the German State Theatre has been organizing Eurothalia, a contemporary theatre festival.

== Directors ==
- Karl Stelzer (1875–1891)
- Emmanuel Raul (1891–1899)
- Rudolf Schati (1953–1956)
- Johann Székler (1956–1971)
- Bruno Würtz (1971–1974)
- Hans Linder (1974–1983)
- Ildikó Jarcsek-Zamfirescu (1983–2001)
- Alexandra Gandi-Ossau (2001–2003)
- Ida Jarcsek-Gaza (2003–2007)
- Lucian Vărșăndan (2007–present)
