= Csiky Gergely Hungarian State Theatre =

Hungarian-language theatre in Timișoara, Romania

Coordinates: 45°45′16″N 21°13′35″E

- Csiky Gergely Állami Magyar Színház
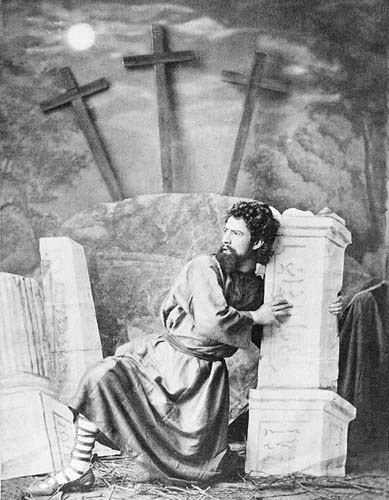
- Ignác Krecsányi on the stage of the Hungarian Theatre in Timișoara
- Formation: 1953
- Type: Theatre group
- Location: Timișoara
- Artistic director: Attila Balázs
- Website: www.tm-t.ro

The Csiky Gergely Hungarian State Theatre (Hungarian: Csiky Gergely Állami Magyar Színház) is a Hungarian-language theatre in Timișoara, Romania, founded in 1957. Its predecessor was the Hungarian section of the State Theater in Timișoara, established as a professional theatre in 1953.

== History ==
=== Beginnings ===
The first Hungarian theatre performance was given here in 1828 by the Košice Singing and Acting Company, which was a guest in Banat, and the performances of the traveling companies became regular from the 1850s. In 1875, the guest actors of the Budapest National Theatre inaugurated Ede Szigligeti's A nőuralom in the building that houses the current three independent theatres and the Timișoara State Opera. Even Emperor Franz Joseph I attended the event. At the beginning, two theatre troupes operated in the building: one in German and the other in Hungarian, and on 1 February 1885, by a decision of the Timișoara City Hall, the Hungarian troupe obtained the status of permanent professional theatre. The first director of the theater was Ignác Krecsányi. Under his directorship, many actors who later became famous began their careers in Timișoara, including Jenő Janovics, Mihály Fekete, Árpád Latabár and Vilma Medgyaszay.

=== After World War I ===
From August 1919, the Hungarian theatre entered a period of decline due to the fall of the Austro-Hungarian Empire, the introduction of censorship, new concession conditions, and later, in 1920, due to the fire in which the theatre building burned almost completely. In addition, in 1921, the new law on theatres was promulgated, which discriminated against minority theatres and which practically put an end to the Hungarian professional theatre in Timișoara.

=== After World War II ===
The Hungarian-language theatre was practically reborn in 1953, when a troupe was set up consisting of members of the theatre ensemble attached to the Timișoara City Hall and of actors of Jódy Károly's Arad and Timișoara troupes. The first appointed director of the new troupe was Emil Josan. The inauguration took place on 3 May 1953 in the "Great Hall", the same that has since served the two troupes of the Hungarian and German theatres, with the comedy Ingyenélők by Gergely Csiky. Under the directorship of János Taub, on 1 October 1957, the "Hungarian section" became an independent institution under the name of the Hungarian State Theatre.

After a period of rise, in which the Hungarian Theatre of Timișoara established itself as one of the most valuable theatres in Romania, in the 1980s, the repertoire became dependent on the requirements of the communist dictatorship, and the institution had to resort to drastic self-financing measures. The effects could be seen quickly, by the sudden reduction of the troupe, by the retirement or departure of the young actors, but also by the alarming dilution of the repertoire – only light comedies, musical and cabinet performances of poor quality were staged. The same situation was also reflected at the end of 1989, when the theatre was renamed the Csiky Gergely State Theater, and the management was taken over by a directorate consisting of Péter Dukász, György Koczka and Lajos Makra.
