= Timișoara Revolution Memorial =

Romanian research foundation

The Timișoara Revolution Memorial (Romanian: Memorialul Revoluției din Timișoara) is a foundation established on 26 April 1990. The aim of the foundation is to research and clarify the events of the December 1989 revolution that started in Timișoara and which ultimately led to the overthrow of the Ceaușescu regime in Romania, as well as to preserve the memory of the victims of the revolution.

== History ==
Established in 1990, Asociația Memorialul Revoluției 16–22 Decembrie 1989 initially focused its research on documenting the martyred heroes of the revolution that took place in Timișoara between 16 and 22 December. Over time, its scope expanded to include the entire country, and it now also investigates the revolutionary events in Cluj-Napoca, Bucharest, and Sibiu. In 1995, the National Center for Documentation, Research, and Information on the Romanian Revolution of 1989 was established within the foundation.

In 2000, it was declared an ensemble of national interest, and in 2011 it acquired the status of a public utility association. In 2019, it received the Order of Cultural Merit in the rank of Knight, from President Klaus Iohannis.

== Headquarters ==
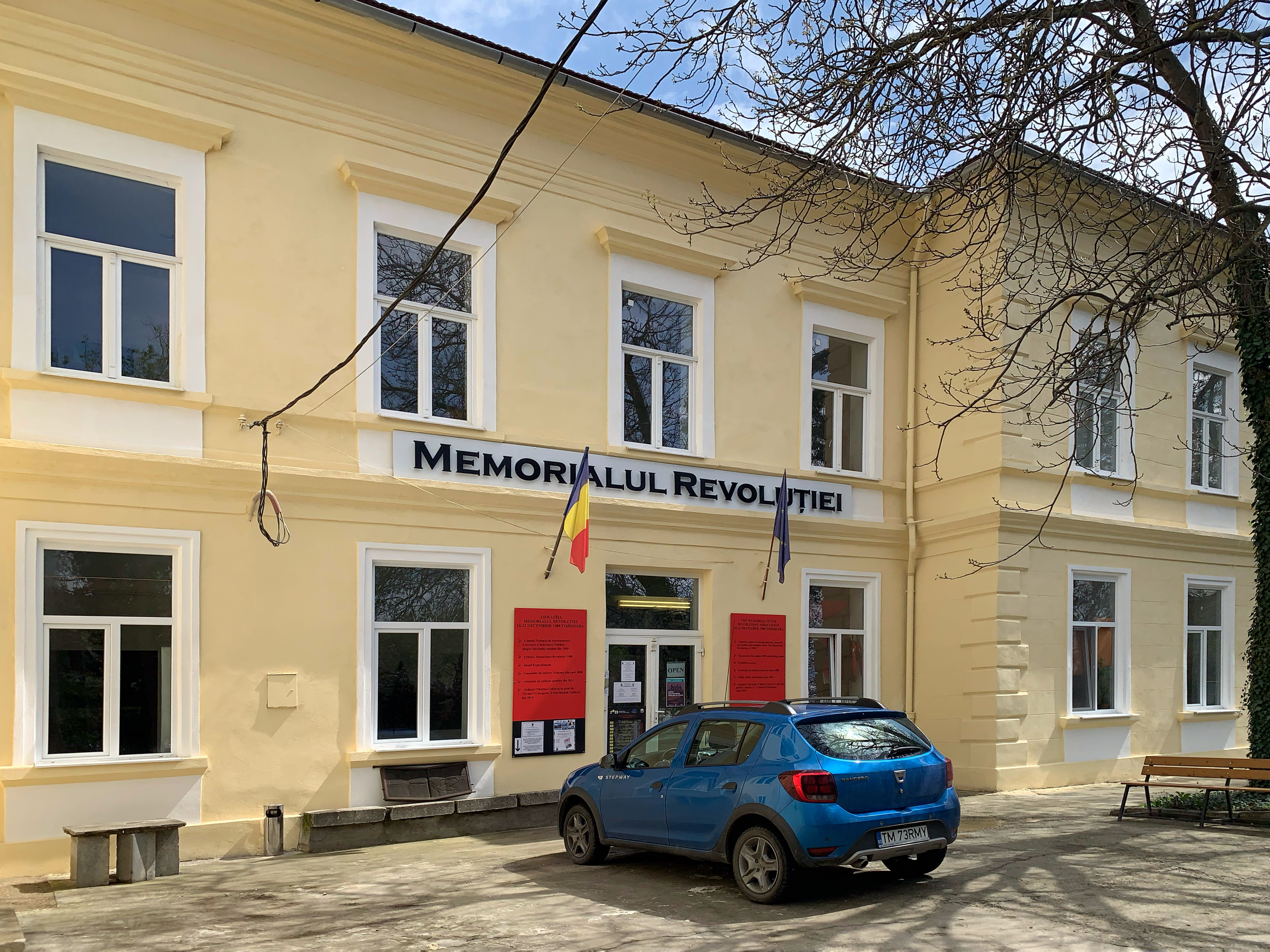
The foundation's headquarters on Oituz Street

The foundation is situated in the historic Cetate district, at 8 Emanoil Ungureanu Street, close to Union Square. It is overseen by Gino Rado, the foundation's director. The building itself, a Baroque-style structure from the 18th century, is recognized as a historical monument.

The property was expropriated in 1948 during the nationalization process, with compensation granted to the former owners in the early 1990s. In 1998, the city administration leased the building and land to the foundation for a 99-year term. At the time, the structure was in poor condition, prompting the foundation to undertake major renovations and expansions, costing 17 billion old lei—equivalent to just under half a million euros. The work was funded through a combination of donations and government grants. As a result of both the restoration and rising property values, the site's worth increased significantly. However, a subsequent legal change allowed the original owners to reclaim the property. After a court ruling in 2010 confirmed its restitution, the city allocated new premises to the foundation in the recently restored Theresia Bastion.

A resolution to the dispute was reached at the end of October 2011. By government decree, the Military Dormitory of the former Garrison on Oituz Street was transferred to the Ministry of Culture, which subsequently donated it to the Revolution Memorial Foundation. The property spans 1,626 square meters, with a built-up area of 846 square meters. The building was allocated to the Revolution Memorial for a period of 49 years, with the possibility of extending this term.

== Activities ==
The foundation documents the events of the December 1989 revolution and shares its research findings with the public. To deepen understanding of the causes and connections, the foundation also focuses on studying Romania's communist era and the links between the Romanian Revolution and other 1989 events in Southeast Europe. To support this mission, the foundation publishes brochures, magazines, books, illustrated volumes, and videos. It organizes symposia, conferences, and exhibitions on revolutionary topics and has erected a memorial along with several monuments to honor the heroes of the revolution. The foundation also aids students and schoolchildren in their research on the revolution. Permanent exhibitions and video presentations further enhance the foundation's efforts to disseminate the results of its research.

== Departments ==
=== Documentation and research center ===
The center holds a variety of original documents related to the events of the revolution, such as photographs, the manifesto of the revolutionaries, a list of the victims from Timișoara who were cremated at the Cenușa crematorium in Bucharest, and testimonies from eyewitnesses.

=== Library and press archive ===
The library holds a wide range of scientific works and literary contributions on the topic of the revolution in Romania. The press archive includes an extensive collection of newspapers that covered the revolution, such as Adevărul, Drapelul roșu, Evenimentul zilei, Luptătorul bănățean, Oblo, Orizont, Revista 22, Strict secret, Timișoara, Ziua, Victoria, and Ziua de Vest.

=== Heroes of the Revolution Chapel ===
The chapel was inaugurated on 22 January 2014 with financial support from the Archdiocese of Timișoara, the Diocese of Caransebeș, the Archdiocese of Arad, and the Roman Catholic Diocese. The paintings were made by the plastic artist Casian Murărașu.

=== Memorial Museum ===
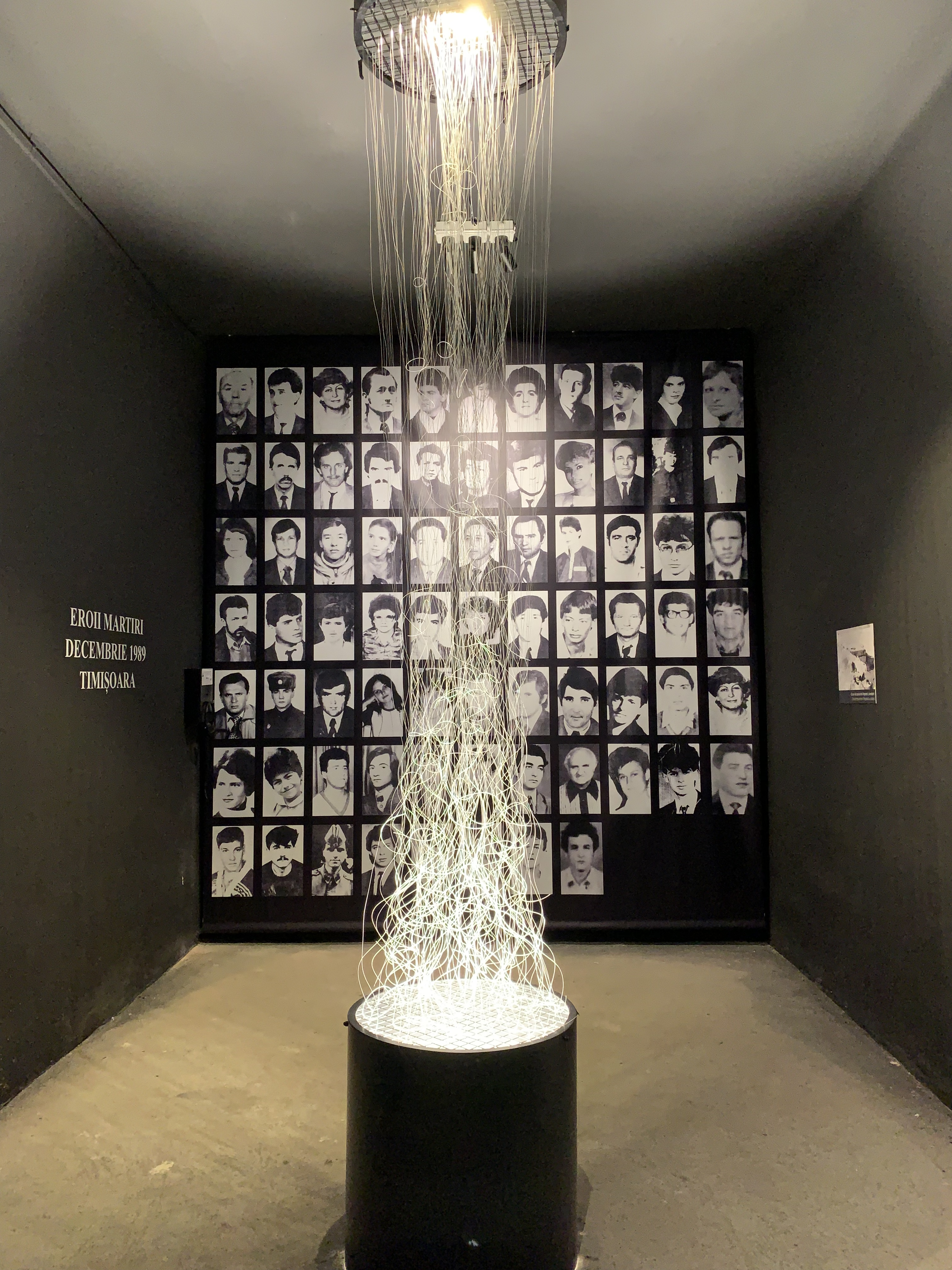
Inside the Memorial Museum

The foundation houses a museum and several permanent exhibitions:

- Ceaușescu – Personality Cult
- Chronology of the Cold War
- The Romanian Revolution in Documents, Newspaper Clippings, Pictures, and Objects
- Monuments Honoring the Heroes of the Revolution in Pictures
- The Revolution in the National and International Press

On 20 December 2012, an original segment of the Berlin Wall—measuring 3 meters in height and weighing 2.5 tonnes—was unveiled in front of the Romanian Revolution Memorial Museum. The piece, a gift from the city of Berlin, was presented during a ceremony attended by Nicolae Robu, the mayor of Timișoara, alongside the museum's director, Traian Orban, and Klaus Christian Olasz, Consul of the Federal Republic of Germany.

=== Monuments ===
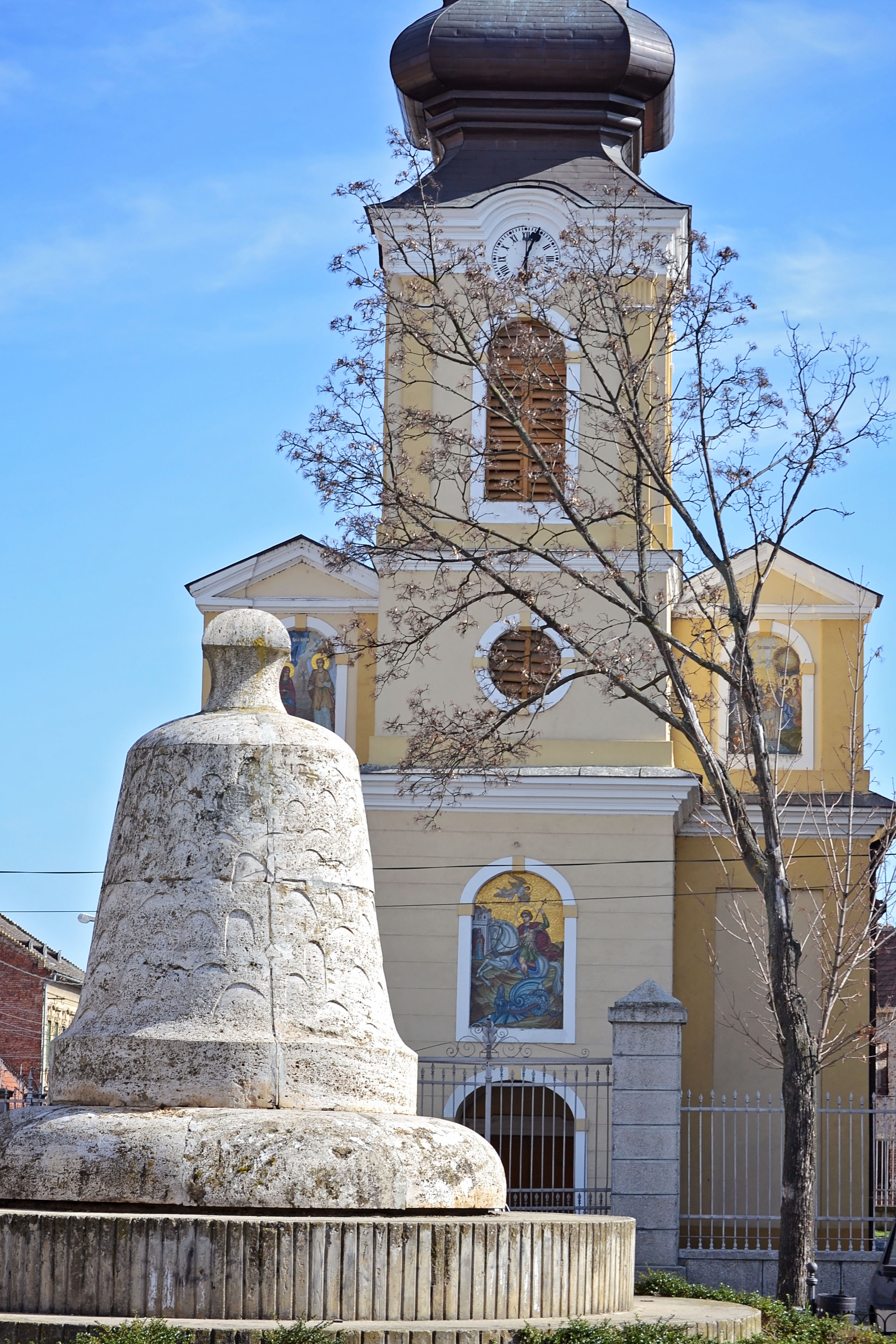
Liberty Bell in Trajan Square

Between 1990 and 1998, a Memorial Complex was established in the Heroes' Cemetery, and 13 monuments were installed throughout the city at locations where acts of repression occurred during the December 1989 revolution.

Name	Material	Author	Year	Location
Deschidere (Opening)	Naval steel	Ingo Glass	1991	Calea Martirilor (near the Youth House)
Eroica	Bronze	Paul Vasilescu	1992	Calea Lipovei
Clopotul libertății (Liberty Bell)	Travertine	Ștefan Călărășanu	1992	Trajan Square
Învingătorul (The Winner)	Bronze	Constantin Popovici	1993	Take Ionescu Boulevard
Evoluție (Evolution)	Bronze	Gheorghe Iliescu-Călinești	1993	Continental Hotel
Omul țintă (Target Man)	Bronze	Béla Szakáts	1994	700 Square (near the Greek Catholic Church)
Biserica plângătoare (Weeping Church)	Bronze	Marian Zidaru	1995	Alexandru Mocioni Square (niche of the Orthodox Church bell tower)
Fântâna martirilor (Martyrs' Fountain)	Travertine	Victor Gaga, Diana Gaga	1995	Behind the Capitol summer garden towards Michael the Brave Bridge
Monumentul studenților (Students' Monument)	Travertine	Ștefan Kelemen	1996	Complexul Studențesc (Cluj Street)
Sfântul Gheorghe (Saint George)	Bronze	Silvia Radu	1997	St. George Square
Martirii (The Martyrs)	Bronze	Péter Jecza	1998	Banat Museum area
Pieta	Bronze	Péter Jecza	1999	Neptune Baths (Decebalus Bridge)
Crucificare (Crucifixion)	Stainless steel	Paul Neagu	1999	Victory Square

=== Publications ===
The foundation has published several publications dedicated to the events of the 1989 revolution:

- Documente '89. Procesul de la Timișoara (2–15 martie 1990). Vol. I–IX.
- Jurnaliști, eroi, teroriști. 2009.
- Atentat împotriva revoluției române. 2010.
- Decembrie, stare de urgență. 2011.
- Revoluția de la Timișoara în context național și internațional. 2018.
- Memorial magazine
