= Atlas Hotel Timișoara =

Atlas Hotel
- Interactive map of the Atlas Hotel area

General information
- Type: Hotel
- Location: 2–3 St. George Square, Timișoara, Romania
- Coordinates: 45.7561026°N 21.2292586°E
- Construction started: 2016
- Opened: 2021
- Cost: EUR 4 million
- Owner: Octavian Grama; Darius Jumanca

Design and construction
- Architects: Bogdan Demetrescu; Andreea Simici; Bogdan Isopescu; Sergiu Sabău; Paul Văleanu; Sorina Rodocan
- Engineer: Marius Moșoarcă; Margareta Florea; Marius Niculescu

Other information
- Number of rooms: 51
- Number of restaurants: 1
- Number of bars: 1

Website
- atlashotel.ro

Atlas Hotel is a four-star hotel in the western Romanian city of Timișoara. It is located in the central area of the city, right across the street from St. George Square.

== History ==
Construction of the hotel began in 2016 on the site of three deteriorating 18th-century buildings located near St. George Square. These buildings were purchased in 2000 by the current owners from the Constructim company. During the Austro-Hungarian period, the site housed an inn and a restaurant. Following World War II, it served as a student dormitory before being repurposed as an office building for public institutions.

The owners initially planned to build a shopping center and even developed a detailed urban plan for it in 2003. However, they abandoned this project in favor of Galeria 1, a shopping center located near Iulius Town.

Because of their severe deterioration, the interiors of buildings 2 and 3 were demolished and subsequently reconstructed. The hotel was designed by the local firm D Proiect. Many original materials were preserved, including wooden beams and a significant portion of the bricks salvaged from the demolished walls, which were reused in the new construction.

The facade preserves the original architectural lines, while the interior features a modern design. The first building has four floors and a raised attic, the second consists of two floors and an attic, and the third—newly constructed on Augustin Pacha Street—includes three rooms, three apartments, and access to the underground parking garage.

The project faced delays due to a legal dispute initiated by a neighboring property owner who had not given consent for the construction. Additionally, progress was hindered by disruptions caused by the COVID-19 pandemic.

The hotel cost over 4 million euros, the investment being made by businessman Darius Jumanca, who also built the four-star Iosefin Residence aparthotel in Alexandru Mocioni Square. The official opening of the hotel took place on 6 November 2021.

== Amenities ==
The hotel offers 51 accommodation units, including a variety of room types and apartments. It features a business center with three conference rooms that can host up to 150 people, along with a dedicated coffee break area. Guests can also enjoy a 100-seat restaurant with an attached brasserie, as well as a bar. A statue of Atlas stands in the lobby, and the hotel provides underground parking for up to ten vehicles.

== Awards and nominations ==
Year	Award	Category	Result
2023	TopHotel Awards	Hotel of the Year – Independent Hotel, 4 stars	Nominated
