= Iosefin Orthodox Church =

Church in Timișoara, Romania

Church of the Nativity of the Theotokos
- Biserica „Nașterea Maicii Domnului”

Religion
- Affiliation: Romanian Orthodox
- Patron: Nativity of the Theotokos
- Year consecrated: 1936
- Status: Active

Location
- Location: 9 Alexandru Mocioni Square, Timișoara
- Interactive map of Church of the Nativity of the Theotokos
- Coordinates: 45°44′46″N 21°12′59″E

Architecture
- Architect: Victor Vlad
- Style: Neo-Byzantine
- General contractor: Constantin Purcariu
- Groundbreaking: 1931
- Completed: 1936

Specifications
- Capacity: 1,000
- Height (max): 33 m

Website
- parohiaiosefin.ro

The Church of the Nativity of the Theotokos is an Orthodox church in the Iosefin district of Timișoara.

== History ==
On 25 January 1902, local businessman Iacob Marian donated his entire fortune to the Diocesan Consistory of Arad in order to build a parish church in the Iosefin district. The constitution of the Orthodox parish in the Iosefin district is made following the parish assembly of 17 April 1921 convened by the lawyer Emanuil Ungurianu, the establishment of the parish being approved by the Diocese of Arad by Decision no. 1941/1921. Following the efforts of Emanuil Ungurianu, in 1925 the Timișoara City Hall donated to the parish a plot of 1,319.8 m^{2} in Asănești Square for the construction of the church, and the Government approved the payment of a parish priest from the state budget.

The first parish priest, elected following a competition organized on 22 July 1927, was Ioan Imbroane, a teacher of religion at Carmen Sylva High School, currently a pedagogical college. Imbroane's installation took place on the second Christmas Day of 1927. He begins raising funds for church construction. On 8 October 1929, Emanuil Ungurianu left his fortune by will to some public institutions, of which a quarter for the construction of the Orthodox church in Iosefin, another quarter for the construction of the Orthodox church in Cetate (current Metropolitan Cathedral), and half for the House of National Education. Another donation, of 100,000 lei left by will by the lawyer Cornel Nicoară, member of the parish synod, is received for the construction of the church in 1931.

In 1931 Ioan Imbroane entrusted the project of the church to the Lugoj-born architect Victor Vlad. The construction works were undertaken by the architect Constantin Purcariu on 30 August 1931. The actual construction begins on 8 September 1931, the consecration service on the occasion of the laying of the foundation stone being done by the bishop of Arad, Grigorie Comșa, and ends in 1936. The church was consecrated on 8 September 1936 by the bishop of Arad, Andrei Magieru. Between 1939 (the date of the founding of the Diocese of Timișoara) and 6 October 1946 (the date of the inauguration of the current Metropolitan Cathedral) it served as an Orthodox cathedral, which is why it is also known as the "Old Orthodox Cathedral".

Over time, the place of worship underwent several phases of restoration, receiving blessings in 1958 from Bishop Vasile Lăzărescu and again in 1985 from Metropolitan Nicolae Corneanu.

== Architecture ==
The church is located in Alexandru Mocioni Square, known in time as Küttl Square, Asănești Square or Ștefan Furtună Square. Although the southern part of the square (where the church is located) is considered to be part of the Elisabetin district, the church was built for Orthodox parishioners in the Iosefin district (which surrounds the square on the other three sides).

Built according to the plans of the architect Victor Vlad in neo-Byzantine style with some elements of the interwar modern style, the church is inspired by the architecture of Hagia Sophia in Istanbul, especially the buttresses, the shape of the dome and the separate bell tower. The height of the dome is 24 m, and of the bell tower 33 m. The church has a nave with an area of approx. 200 m^{2} and can accommodate 1,000 churchgoers. The mural, executed in the buon fresco style, belongs to the painters Catul Bogdan (apse) and Ioachim Miloia (dome) and was restored in 1958 by Anastasie Damian, who added another 18 biblical scenes, and in 1983–1985 by Victor Jurca, who added another 70 scenes. The iconostasis, the chandelier and the tomb of the Lord, in the style of the baptistery from Curtea de Argeș, were carved from lime wood by Ștefan Gajo. The thrones, chairs and pews were carved from oak by Traian Novac. The floor is made of a combination of white Rușchița marble and pink marble. The bell tower has six bells, cast in 1936, harmonized in the arpeggio.

In the courtyard of the church, arranged like a small park, are the busts of the five founders of the church: Iacob Marian, Victor Vlad, Ioan Imbroane, Emanuil Ungurianu and Ioachim Miloia, executed by the sculptor Aurel Gheorghe Ardeleanu. The busts of Vlad, Imbroane and Ungurianu were unveiled on 8 September 2007, and those of Marian and Miloia on 7 September 2008. A sixth bust, that of musicologist Sabin Drăgoi, was added on 22 May 2016.

== Gallery ==
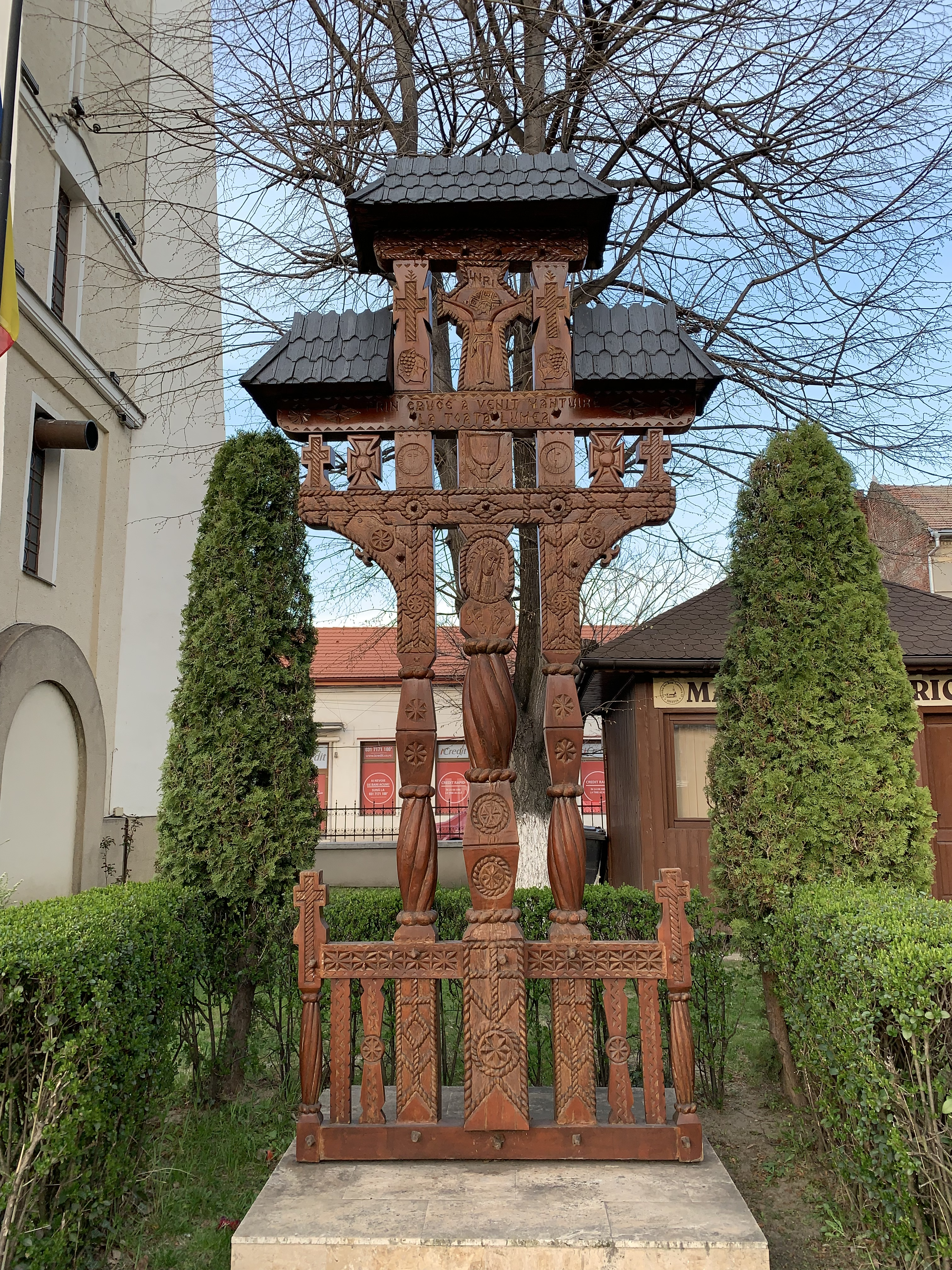
Wooden carved triptych

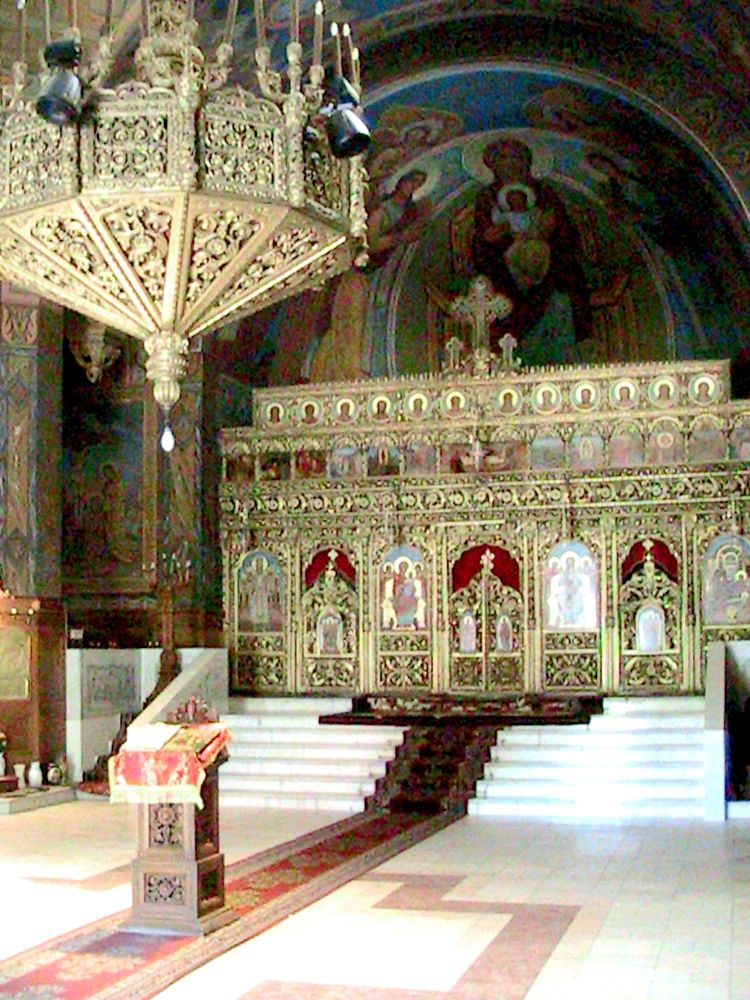
The iconostasis

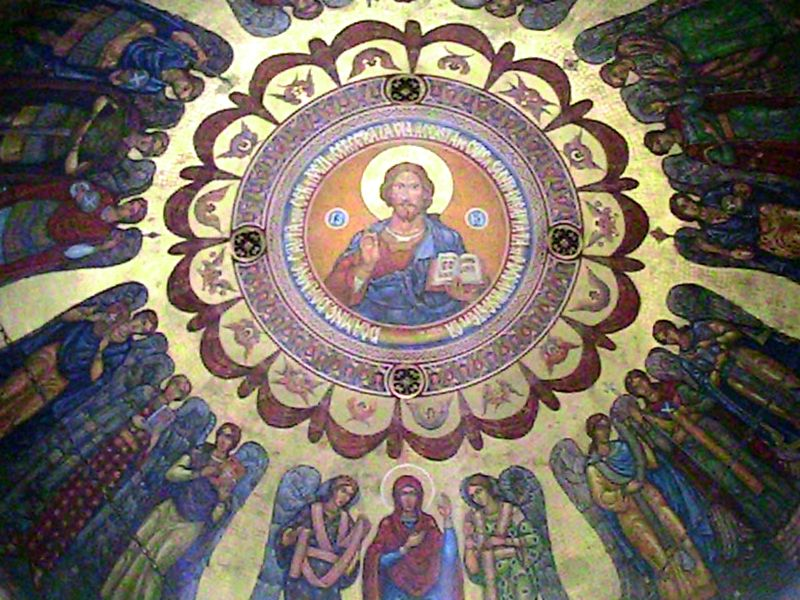
The dome

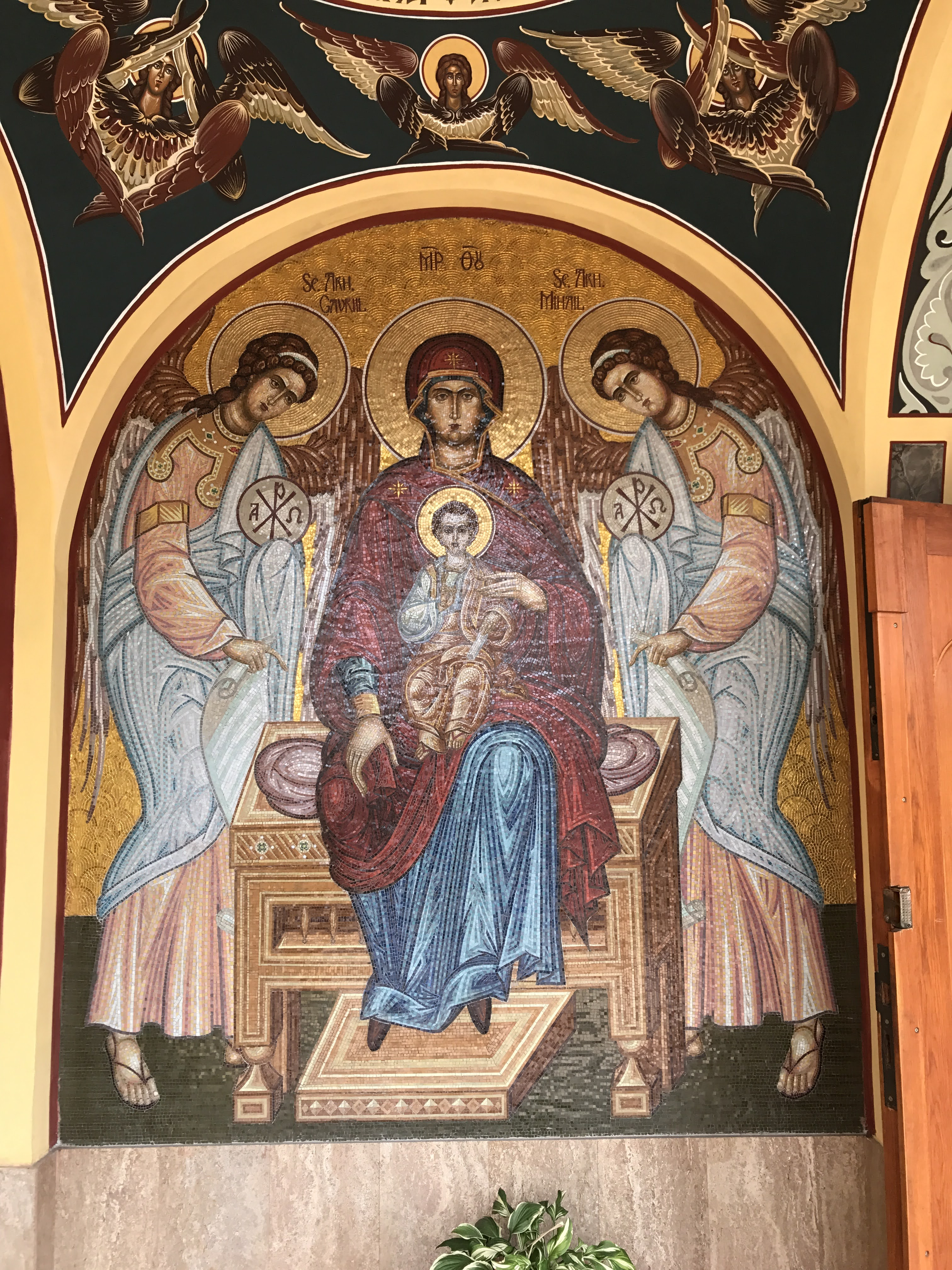
The Madonna and Child

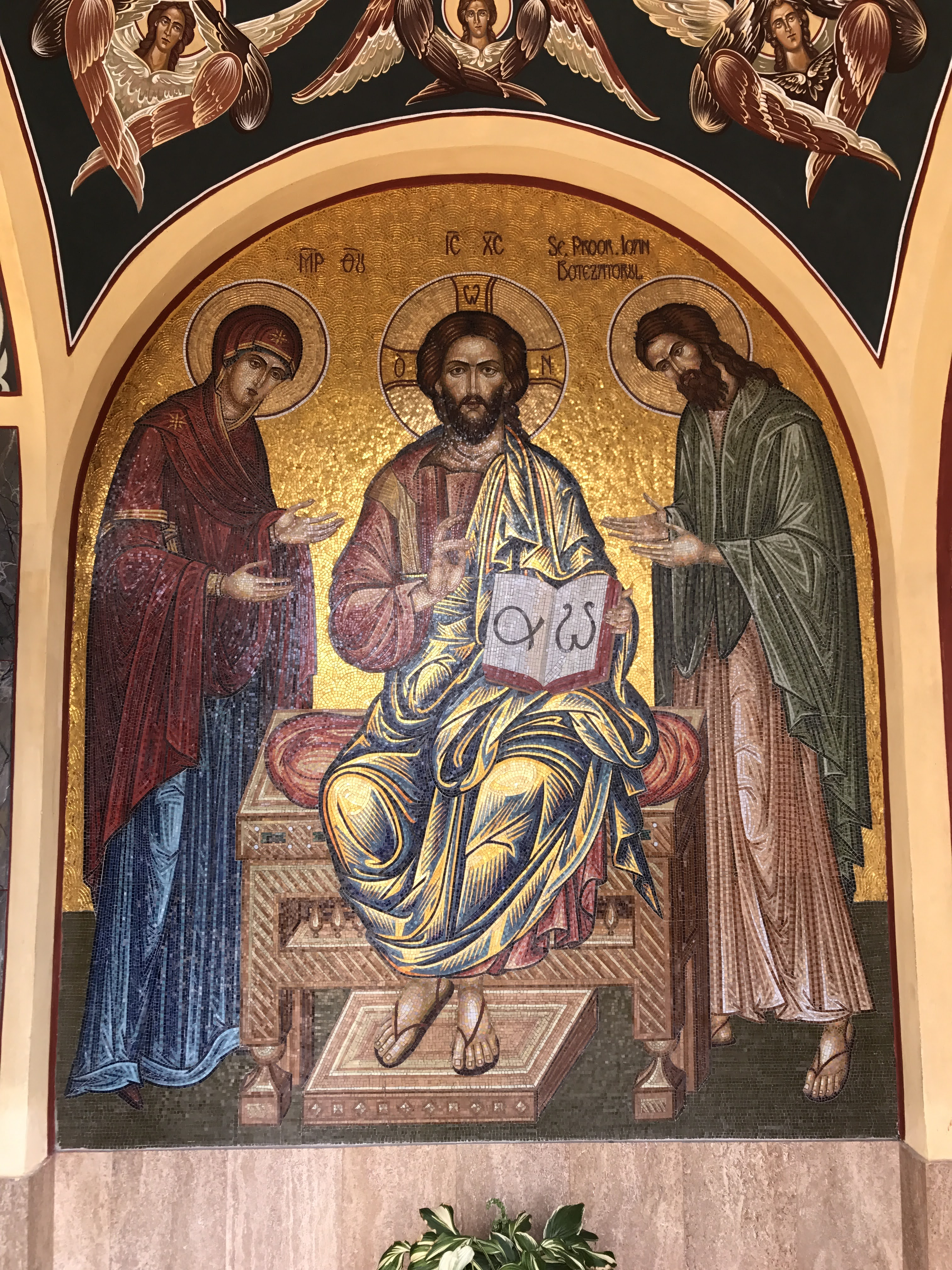
The Deisis
