= Savings Bank Palace =

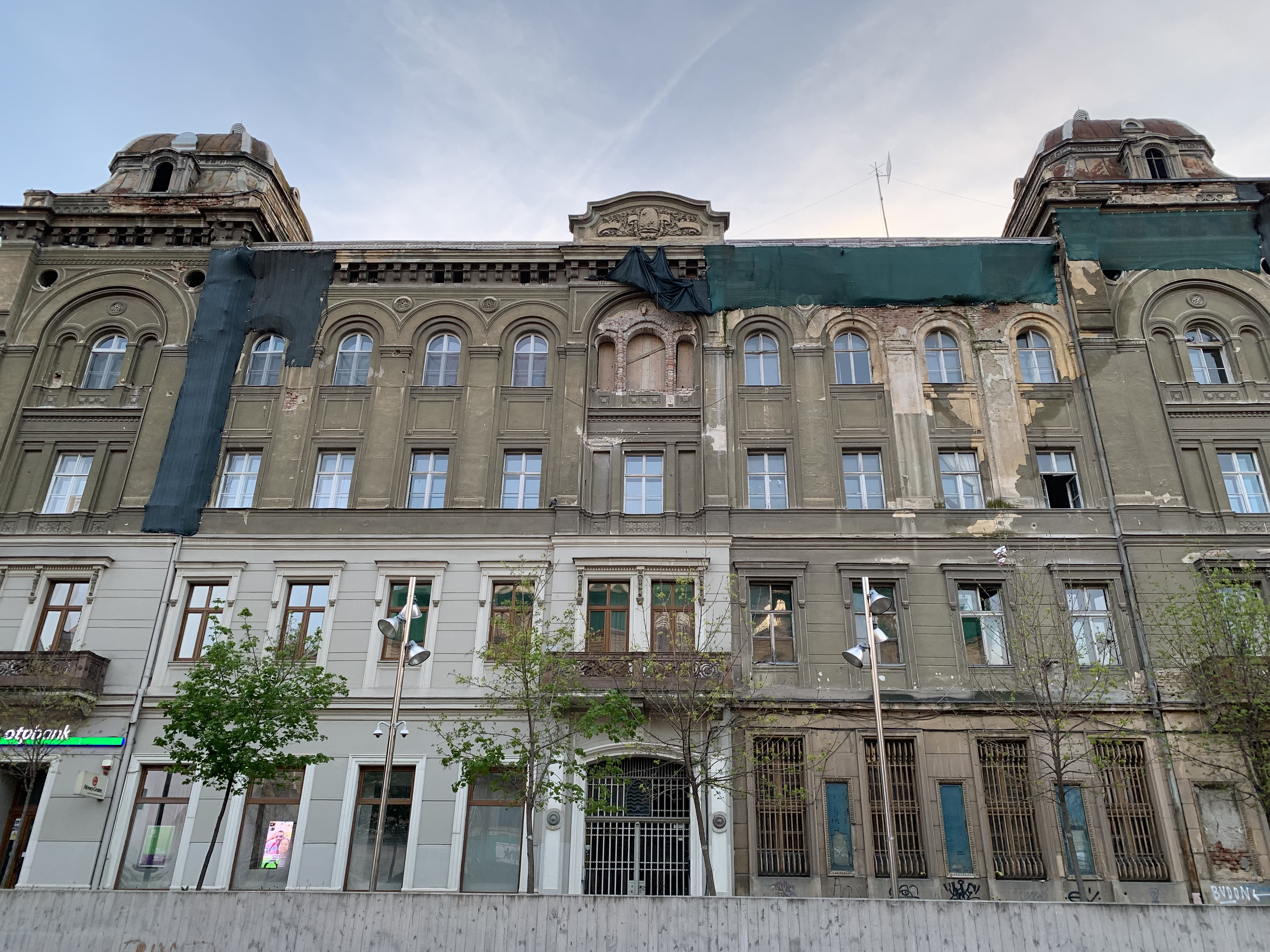
- Interactive map of the Savings Bank Palace area

General information
- Architectural style: Eclectic historicist
- Location: St. George Square, Timișoara
- Coordinates: 45°45′20″N 21°13′42″E
- Construction started: 1847
- Completed: 1855
- Renovated: 1913

Design and construction
- Architect: Karl May

Renovating team
- Architect: László Székely

The Savings Bank Palace is a historic building in Timișoara, Romania, located on the western side of St. George Square. Designed in 1855 by Karl May in an historicist eclectic style, it served as the headquarters of the First Timișoara Savings Bank (Hungarian: Temesvári Első Takarékpénztá; German: Erste Temeswarer Sparkassa), founded in 1846 as the earliest financial institution in Temes County. The building was remodeled in 1912–1913 according to the design of architect László Székely. It is included in the Timișoara Citadel urban site, protected as a historical monument.

== History ==
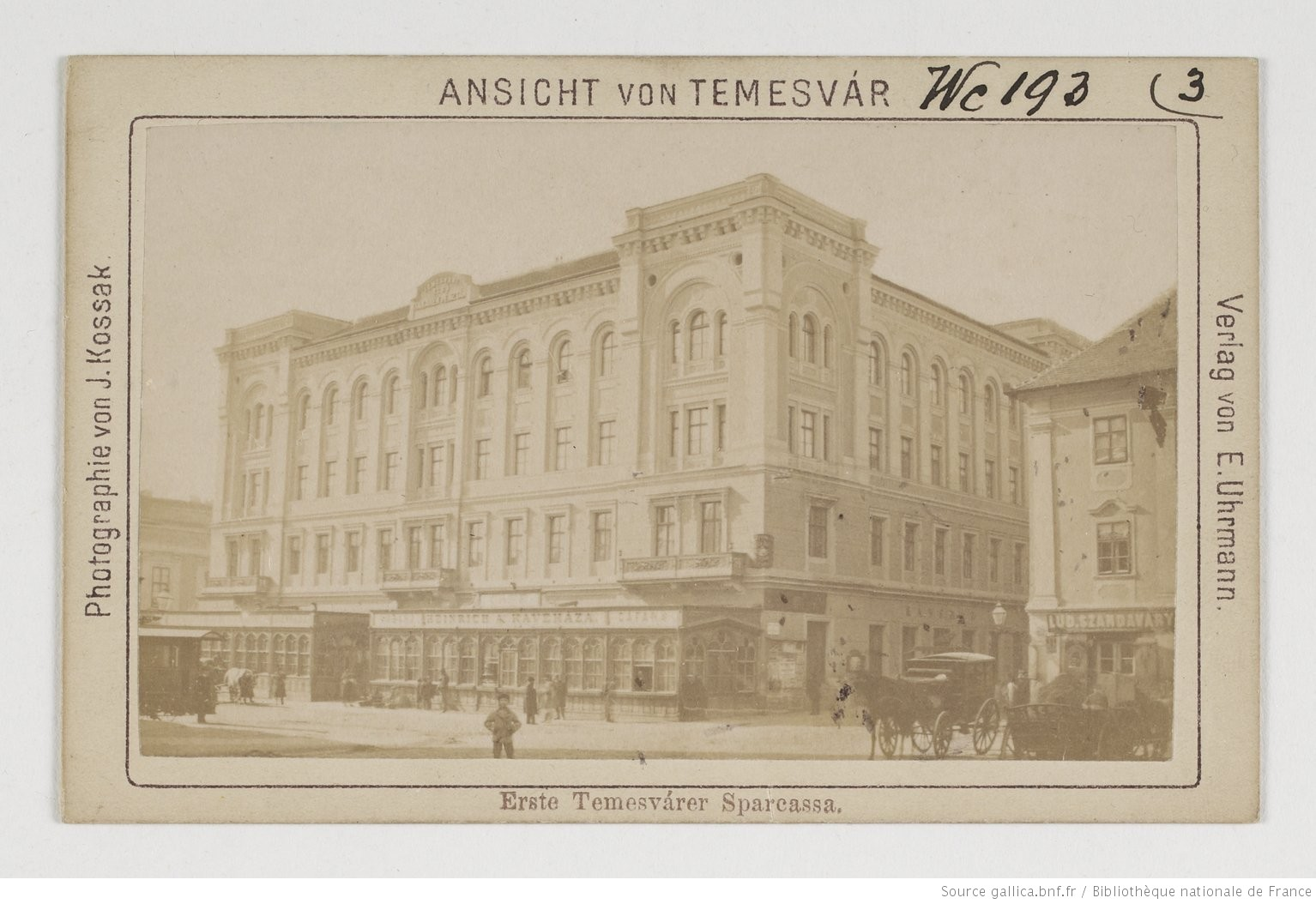
The First Timișoara Savings Bank in 1880

The First Timișoara Savings Bank was founded in 1846 and quickly proved successful. As it lacked a dedicated headquarters, a decision was made to construct one on the western side of present-day St. George Square, with work commencing the following year. During the siege by Hungarian revolutionaries, the unfinished structure partially collapsed, resulting in the deaths of two workers. After the Revolution was suppressed and stability was restored, construction resumed and was completed in 1855.

Constructed on four fronts, the building was erected on the former site of the Casino Society by architect Karl May. Two wooden annexes adjoining the palace's ground floor housed an English café and a Pilsner brewery, while local entrepreneur József Wolf opened a restaurant on the ground floor that gained renown for its cuisine. Several foundations and associations also rented premises within the bank's headquarters.

== Architecture ==
The architectural style of the Savings Bank Palace is eclectic historicist, incorporating both classicist and neo-Romantic elements. Over time, the building has undergone several alterations, the most significant of which took place in 1913 under architect László Székely, who introduced the aedicules and modernized the façade. The exterior is adorned with paired pilasters and arches in the Rundbogenstil manner, typical of late 19th- and early 20th-century architecture. Its central motif—the beehive—appears on the two towers, at the center of the roof, and as a bas-relief above the main entrance, symbolizing thrift and industriousness. Equally notable is the refined ironwork, particularly the balcony railings with volutes inspired by Baroque design.
