= Church of the Nativity of Saint John the Baptist (Arad, Romania) =

Heritage site in Arad County, Romania

Coordinates: 46°10′14″N 21°18′43″E

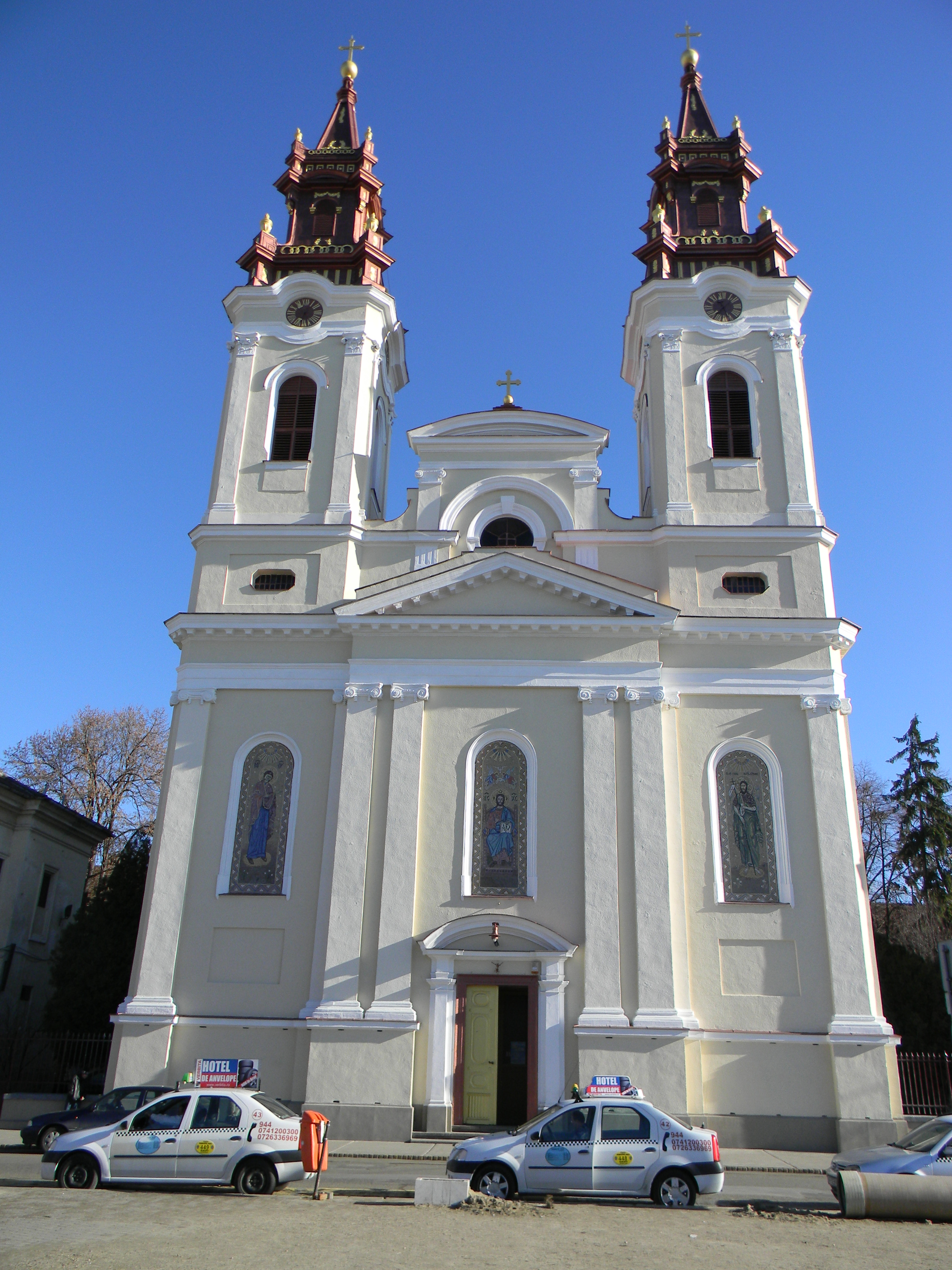
Church of the Nativity of Saint John the Baptist

The Church of the Nativity of Saint John the Baptist (Romanian: Biserica Nașterea Sfântului Ioan Botezătorul) is a Romanian Orthodox church located at 15 Piața Catedralei, Arad, Romania. It is dedicated to the Nativity of Saint John the Baptist.

After the demolition of an old church near the Mureș River, a new one was begun upon the initiative of Prokopije Ivačković, the Bishop of Arad. Construction lasted from 1862 to 1865, receiving funds from the Mocioni family and from Viennese banker Simon Sinas. Anton Czigler, a native of Gyula, was the architect. After its dedication, the building served as the diocesan cathedral.

Certain details of the facade, such as the pediment, were only added during the 1905-1906 restoration. In 1966, three mosaics were placed on the facade. The bell, dated 1764, comes from the previous church.

The building is U-shaped, the wings opening on the yard through semicircular arches. The lower interior walls are of artificial marble; the middle feature plant decorations; the upper is painted in Orthodox iconography. The windows are of colored glass, without designs. The two towers were lengthened in 1904; each has a clock. The style is a classicizing neo-Baroque, more akin to 19th-century Western than contemporary Orthodox churches. Over time, the location became less central, so that a new cathedral superseded the old in 2009.

The church is listed as a historic monument by Romania's Ministry of Culture and Religious Affairs.
