= Sofronije Ravaničanin =

Serbian Orthodox bishop of Arad

Sofronije Ravaničanin (Serbian Cyrillic: Софроније Раваничанин) was a Serbian Orthodox monk, bishop of the Serbian Archdiocese of Arad in the period from 1722 to 1726. He is believed to have died in 1726.

Sofronije Ravaničanin got his surname from the Ravanica Monastery, where he spent most of his life. In 1691, anticipating the invasion by Ottoman Turks, the monastic community retreated from the area, taking with them the monastery's relics and other valuables. It is recorded that as a hieromonk, Ravaničanin was one of the guardians of the relics of Prince Lazar, when they were taken to Szentendre, and then to Vrdnik Monastery, where Ravaničanin was also the abbot.

After the death of Bishop Joanikije in 1721, Jovan Tekelija with Arad Serbs and Pomorišje border officers addressed Vikentije Popović-Hadžilavić, then the Metropolitan of Karlovci, with a request that Sofronije Ravaničanin be appointed as their bishop. In accordance with this request, the following year, the metropolitan recommended Sofronije to the Court as bishop. This was opposed by Mojsije Petrović, the future Metropolitan of Belgrade-Karlovci, who instead proposed Vikentije Jovanović, the bishop of Timișoara, for the position. The views of Ravaničanin's supporters in Arad, along with the influence of Metropolitan Vikentije, were sufficient for Sofronije to be confirmed. One factor may have been that both Ravaničanin and his supporters had offered money to cover the cost of the consecration.

He was consecrated as bishop in 1722, perhaps on the feast day of St. George, and served until he died in 1726. Shortly before his death, in March 1726, he felt obliged to write to the recently installed Metropolitan Mojsije, to offer penance for keeping someone known as Anna in his home. He undertook not to see her again, and from then henceforth, no other females would be allowed to drink in the bishop's house. His successor as bishop of Arad, Vikentije Jovanović, was announced in September 1726.

While he was bishop, he resided at the Vrdnik Monastery. He is remembered for advocating against Uniate sentiments, shared by many senior members of Orthodoxy, including, it was suspected, the previous bishop of Arad, Joanikije Martinović. Ravaničanin made it clear that he was not in favour of his church going into the union with the Roman Catholic Church.
