= Visarion Aștileanu =

Priest and bishop of Arad, Romania

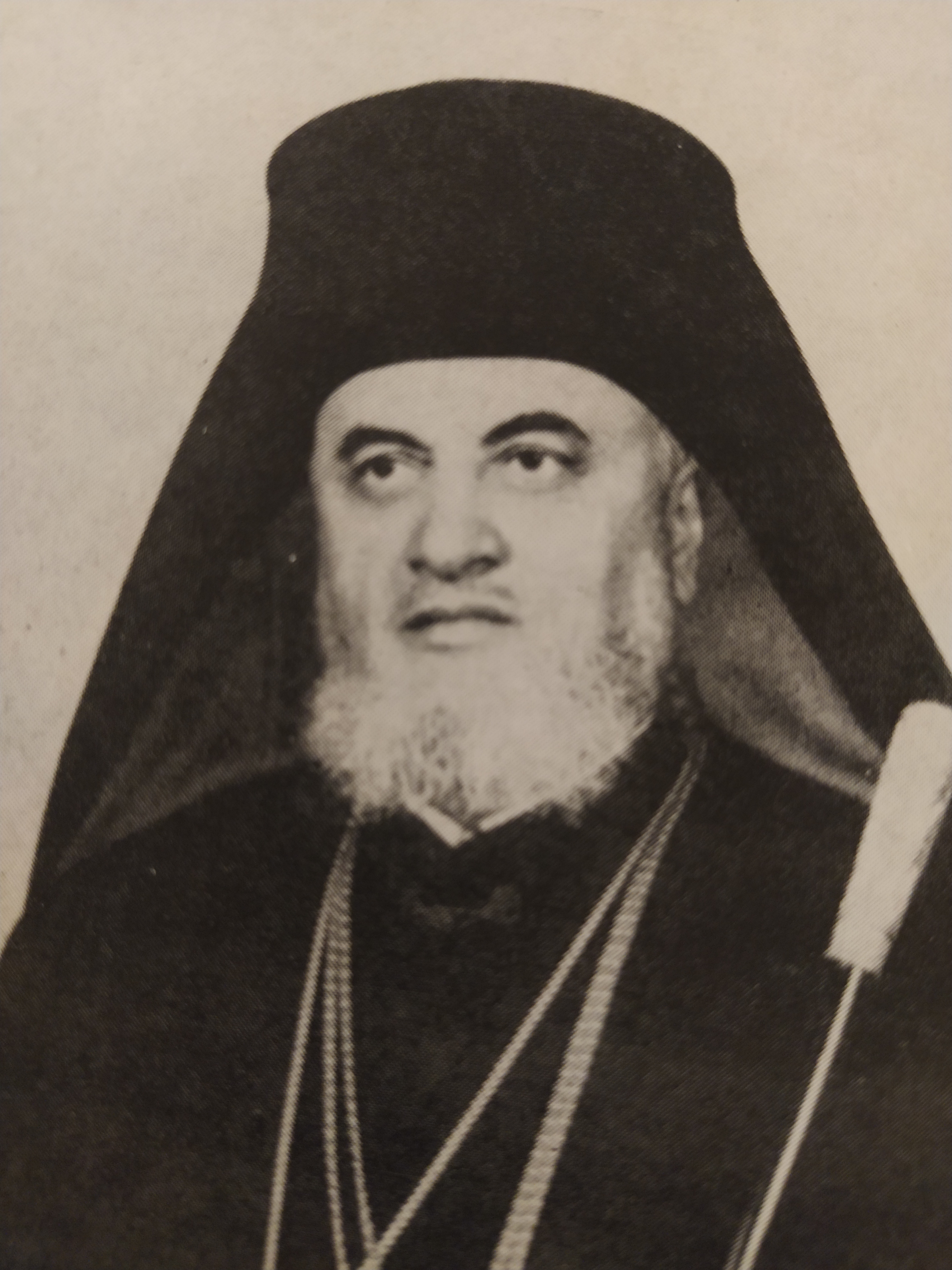
- Church: Romanian Orthodox Church
- Diocese: Arad
- Installed: 1968
- Predecessor: Teoctist Arăpașu
- Successor: Timotei Seviciu

Personal details
- Born: Vasile Aștileanu; March 14, 1914 Cluj
- Died: August 6, 1984 (aged 70) Arad
- Denomination: Eastern Orthodox Church
- Profession: Theologian

Bishop Visarion (secular name Vasile Benedict Aștileanu; March 14, 1914, in Cluj – August 6, 1984, in Arad), was a Romanian Greek Catholic priest, secretary of the bishop Iuliu Hossu, a political detainee, then a Roman Catholic parson and afterwards the Orthodox Bishop of the Diocese of Arad.

== Biography ==
Vasile Aștileanu finished secondary studies at the “George Bariț” highschool in Cluj (1925–1933), went to college at The United Theological Academy in Cluj (1933–1935) and continued with studies in philosophy and theology at the college De Propaganda Fide in Rome (1935–1942), where he was sent by the bishop Iuliu Hossu. In Rome he obtained his license (1941) and his doctorate (1942). He was Eparchial secretary and priest at the Bob Church in Cluj (1942-1949).

Between 1952 and 1955, he was detained on political reasons as a Greek-Catholic priest, with the charge of having organized the resistance at the Cluj-Gherla Diocese. After his release from prison, he was for a short time Roman Catholic vicar of the “Saint Apostles Peter and Pavel” church in Răducăneni from what is currently the Iași County.

In 1958 he converted to the Romanian Orthodox Church. On 21 October 1958 in Alba Iulia, at the commemoration of ten years of the unification of the Uniate Church with the Orthodox Church, at the end of the religious service Dr. Vasile Aștileanu declared that he had decided to return to the Romanian Orthodox Church and asked for forgiveness from the hierarchy and the faithful for opposing unification until then.

He was first assigned as a Patriarchal inspector, and from 1962 as a Patriarchal vicar. His conversion to the Romanian Orthodox Church was used by the authorities as a means to pressure other Greek-Catholic priests to follow his example. In November 1958, after Aștileanu's “come to his senses”, many Greek-Catholic priests who had been practicing clandestinely (in Turdaș, Benic, Crișcior, Beldiu etc.) were arrested.

While he was a Patriarchal general inspector, he also served as a priest at the Popa Tatu church and the Antim Monastery in Bucharest (1958–1961). On 9 September 1962, he took his monastic vows at the Sinaia Monastery under the name of Visarion and was ordained bishop with the title of “Ploeșteanul”. Between 1962 and 1969 he worked as a Patriarchal Bishop-Vicar. On December 16, 1968, he was voted Bishop-Vicar of the Metropolis of Ardeal, with the title of “Rășinăreanul”, recognised in office by Nicolae Ceaușescu on 30 December 1968. His appointing in office took place on June 1, 1969. On June 10, 1973, he was voted Bishop of the Arad diocese, as the successor of the bishop Teoctist Arăpașu. He took over the Arad diocese on August the 26th 1973, where he served until his death.

As bishop of Arad, he led the administrative-economical activity of the diocese, he reopened the Monastery of Prislop and he was preoccupied in the revaluation of the cultural and artistic heritage of the diocese. He edited a book entitled "Hodoș-Bodrog Monastery" (Arad, 1980). He was part of a few conciliar delegations who visited other churches and he participated in the general assembly of the Conference of European Churches in Nyborg (1964).

Bishop Iuliu Hossu has related in his biography that Aștileanu visited him at the Căldărușani Monastery in 1961. According to Iuliu Hossu's recollection, when Aștileanu came face to face with him, his eyes filled with tears and he could barely speak. The editor of the book, the monk Silvestru Augustin Prunduș, has mentioned in a foot note that towards the end of his life, when he was already the bishop of Arad, Visarion Aștileanu received communion from Romanian Greek Catholic priests to whom he confessed that he feels trapped like into a prison, being closely watched by the diocese staff.
