= Iosefin Residence =

Iosefin Residence Apart Hotel
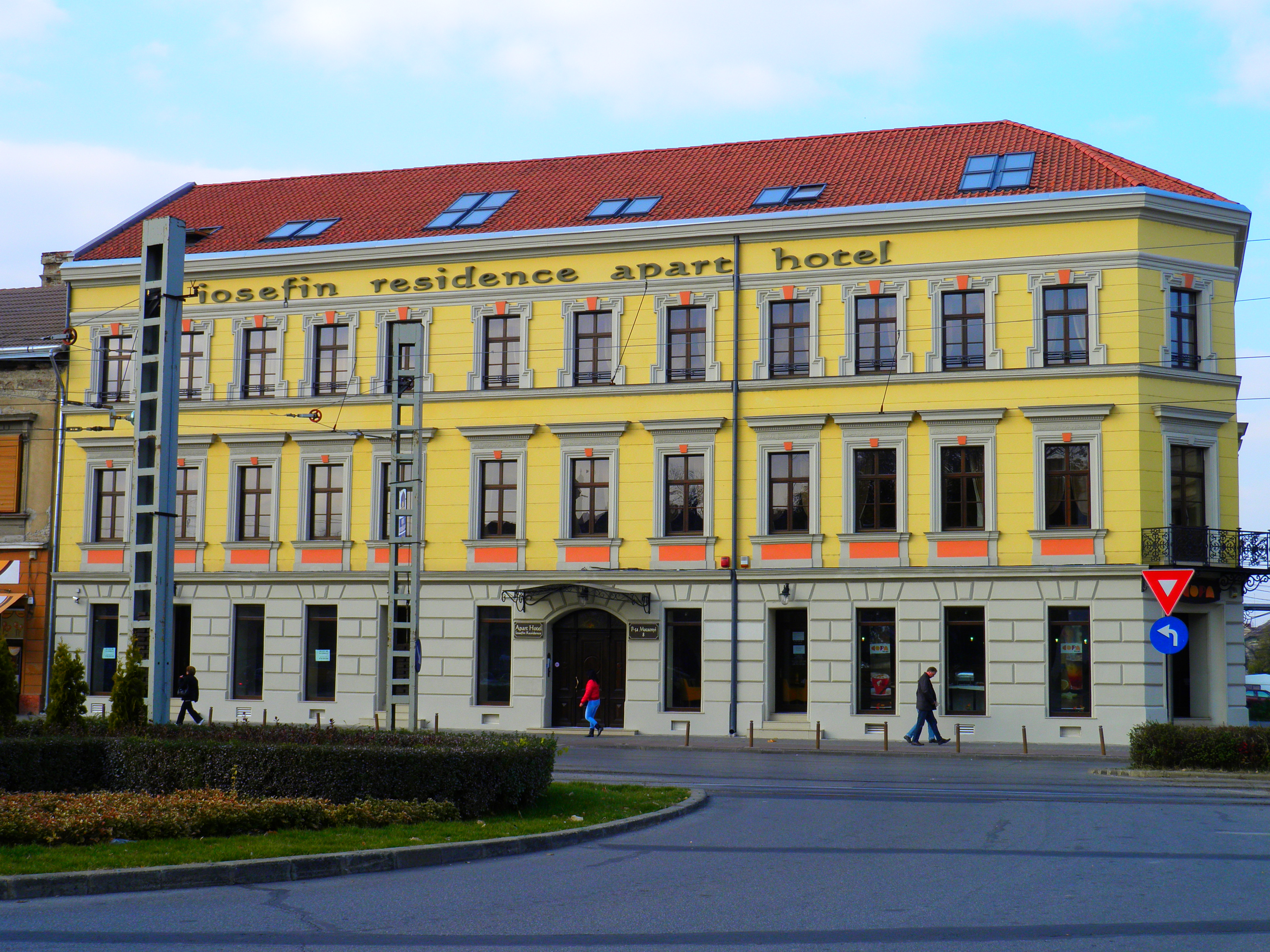
- Alternative names: Mária Radocsay House

General information
- Type: Apartment hotel
- Architectural style: Historicist
- Address: 8 Alexandru Mocioni Square, Timișoara, Romania
- Coordinates: 45°44′48″N 21°12′56″E
- Completed: 1894

Other information
- Number of rooms: 25
- Number of restaurants: 1

Website
- iosefinresidence.ro

Iosefin Residence Apart Hotel, hosted in 19th-century Mária Radocsay House, is a hotel in the western Romanian city of Timișoara.

== History ==
Iosefin Residence is situated in a historic building dating back to the mid-19th century, originally owned by Mária Radocsay. Located at 8 Alexandru Mocioni Square, the structure was designed in a historicist architectural style featuring classicist elements. In 1891, a permit was granted for the extension of the original single-story house, followed by a second permit in 1894 for the construction of a two-story building. The property underwent restoration between 2007 and 2010, based on a project by architect Constantin Ciocan.

== Amenities ==
The hotel offers 25 apartments in total, comprising 12 business apartments, five standard apartments, and eight studio units. Each apartment includes a living room, bedroom, kitchen, and bathroom.

The hotel includes the Old Yard restaurant, which serves international cuisine and offers outdoor seating on the terrace during the summer months. Guests can also enjoy the on-site Copa Café. In addition, the hotel provides a business center along with facilities for events and conferences.
