= St. George Church, Timișoara =

Former church in Timisoara, Romania

St. George Church
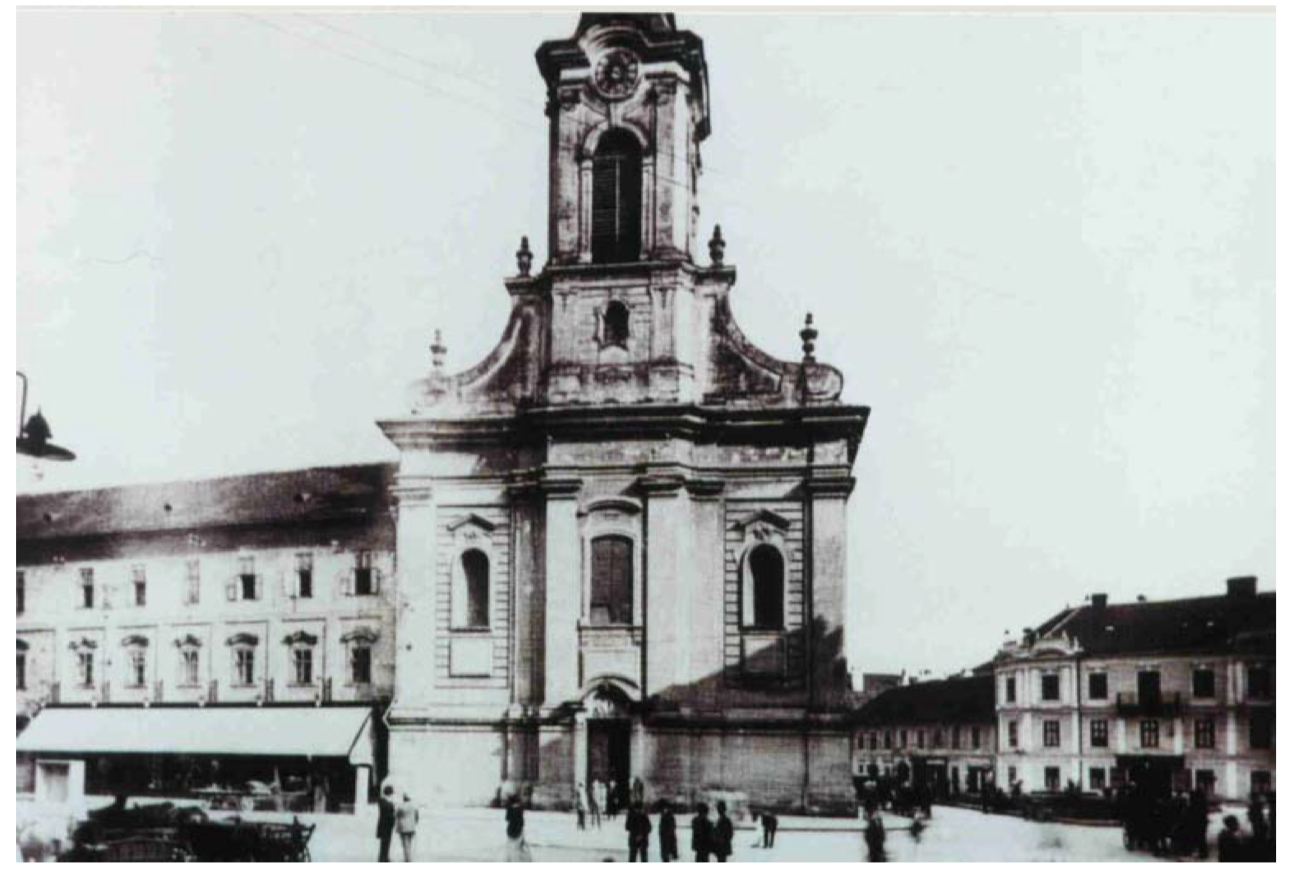

Religion
- Affiliation: Roman Catholic
- Patron: Saint George
- Status: Demolished

Location
- Location: Timișoara, Romania
- Interactive map of St. George Church
- Coordinates: 45°45′21″N 21°13′44″E

Architecture
- Type: Church
- Style: Baroque
- Groundbreaking: 1755
- Completed: 1769
- Demolished: 1914

The St. George Church was a place of worship located in today's St. George Square in Timișoara, Romania, demolished in 1914.

== History ==
=== First church ===
The earliest recorded mention of a church in the St. George Square area dates back to 21 January 1323. On that day, Csanád Telegdi was confirmed as Bishop of Eger at the St. George Cathedral in Timișoara by Provost Theophil. At the time, Timișoara served as the residence of King Charles Robert of Anjou. Subsequent references to the church appear between 1402 and 1429, but no additional details are known until 1552, during the period of Ottoman rule, when the church was converted into a mosque. It became known as the "Great Mosque," the "Mosque of the Victorious Sultan," or, in some documents, the "Illustrious and Great Mosque" (Djami şerif-i kebir). Twenty years after the Ottoman conquest, records indicate that the roof required repairs, and by 1616, the building was being used as a breadcrumb storage facility.

Following the liberation of Timișoara by the Habsburgs, the building was repurposed by the military as a powder magazine between 1717 and 1718. In 1717, Emperor Charles VI created a fund to support the Jesuits—four priests and one monk—and the church was granted to them by Eugene of Savoy.

Before the arrival of the Jesuits, the city was already home to Franciscan Friars Minor, who had settled in the northern part of Timișoara and, in 1716, were granted the former Turkish mosque located in what is now Liberty Square. Initially, the Jesuits shared this space, as the mosque donated to them was still being used as a powder magazine. Eventually, they cleared and restored their assigned mosque, and on 7 April 1718, in the presence of both civil and military authorities, as well as a large crowd, it was reconsecrated. Following the recitation of the Te Deum, the building once again became a Catholic place of worship—on the very site where Timișoara's parish cathedral had stood before 1552.

The church was named "Santa Maria Serena," in reference to the clear and beautiful weather during the siege of the city, which had played a crucial role in the successful assault on the fortress. That same year, the church received three bells from Vienna: one dedicated to the Virgin Mary, another to Saint Francis Borgia, and the third to Jesuit martyr Emmanuele Neri, who was killed in Cluj on 9 June 1603, during the sacking of the university. Neri was venerated at the Jesuit monastery in Timișoara.

Later, Emperor Charles VI designated Timișoara as the seat of the historic Diocese of Cenad. On March 5, 1724, Count László Nádasdy, Bishop of Cenad, held his official entry ceremony into the city. Soon after, religious and moral life in Timișoara began to flourish. Among the initiatives was the founding of the Association of Saint John of Nepomuk, which aimed to uphold good reputation, promote virtuous conduct, and encourage charitable deeds—essentially fostering a devout and moral way of life. Meanwhile, the Hungarian population in the city steadily grew, and by 1730, a Jesuit named Hunyady was preaching in Hungarian. Around this time, the Jesuits also began constructing a new mission house adjacent to the church.

In 1732, specific plots of land were allocated for the Cenad bishopric, the cathedral chapter, and the future cathedral. Until the cathedral's completion, the bishop conducted services in the Jesuit church. Around the same time, in 1733, the Franciscans began constructing their own church—the building later known as the Piarist Church in Liberty Square. The Association of Saint John of Nepomuk also played a significant role in the city's development. With sufficient financial resources, it laid the foundation for a municipal hospital, which was entrusted to the Misericordian order in 1737. In 1736, work began on the Roman Catholic Cathedral, known today as the Dome. However, a devastating blow struck the city in 1738, when a severe plague outbreak claimed the lives of most of the population. Despite strict quarantine measures, the epidemic could not be contained. The situation worsened when cameral officials abandoned the city, taking their supplies with them. The Jesuits, fulfilling their priestly duties, were among those affected by the disease. With farmland left untended, the city faced severe shortages. Survivors were eventually aided with provisions from the residents of Szeged and later by the government in Vienna. Once the plague subsided, the city vowed to hold an annual penitential procession to the Chapel of St. Rosalia in remembrance and gratitude.

In 1726, Superior Priest Antonius Perger sought Count Mercy's support for building a new church and residence, requesting that construction materials be provided free of charge. Mercy backed this appeal in a letter dated 9 April 1726, addressed to the court chancellery, in which he asked that the construction of the Jesuit church and monastery be funded ab aerario—from the public treasury.

In 1739, an earthquake reportedly caused significant damage to the old church, prompting the order to request the construction of a new place of worship. As a result, the original church was demolished and rebuilt, dedicated to Saint George.

=== Second church ===
The construction costs were fully covered by the Imperial Treasury. On 17 August 1753, Maria Theresa approved a budget of 3,000 guilders for the church's construction, and by 1754, the Jesuits had already received 8,000 guilders. According to provincial engineer Steinlein, actual construction of the church did not begin until 1755, with building efforts intensifying throughout the 1760s. This was partly due to the high expenses of constructing the new cathedral, which placed a significant strain on the construction fund during the 1750s. Additionally, the church's construction faced challenges because it incorporated the old church's existing foundations. According to Steinlein: "initially, the architects were not interested in the old Turkish wall, but in the whole new main church building, it was proposed to use the pillars that were not laid out in the original style at that time."

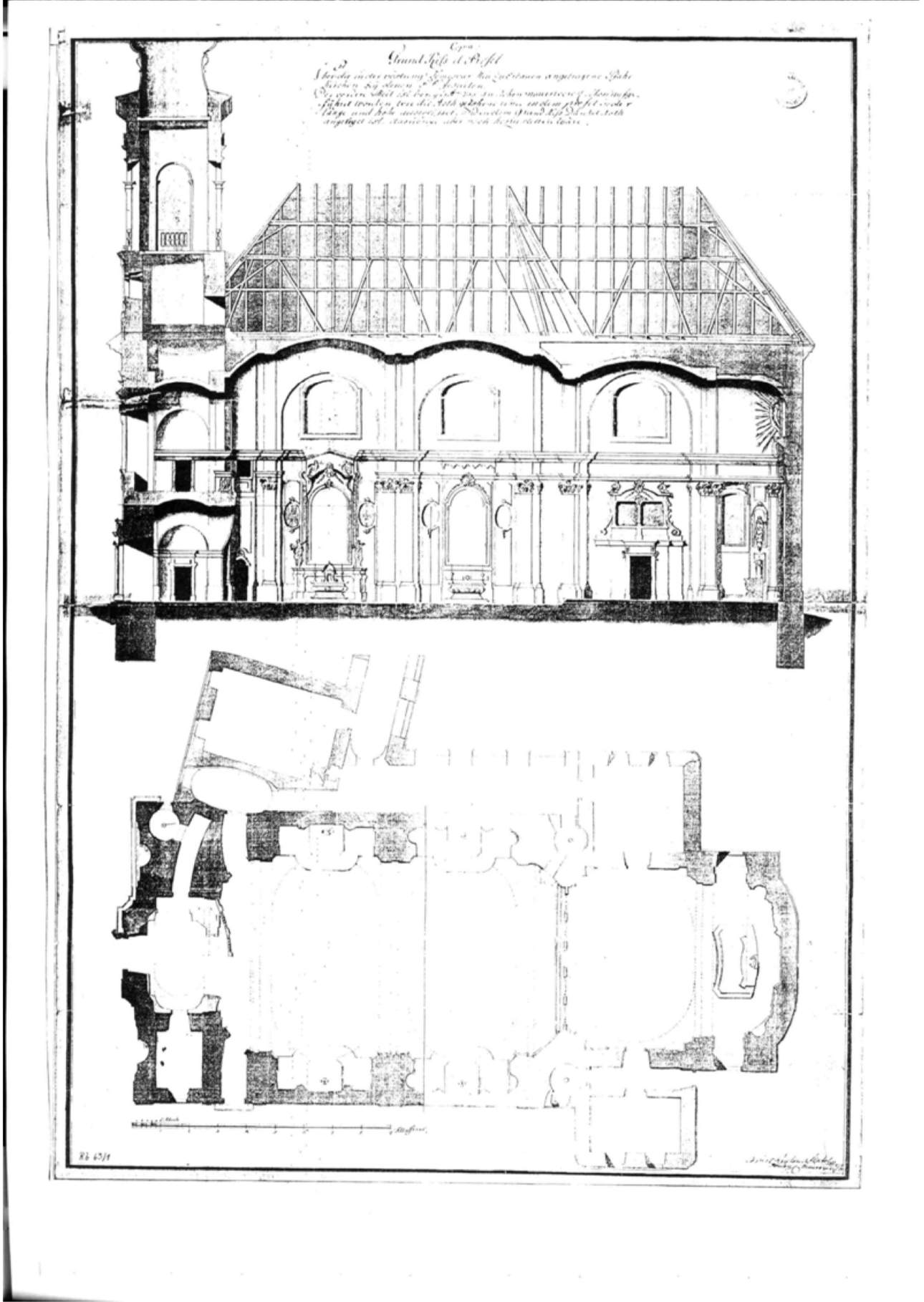
The plan of the St. George Church, drawn by Franz Anton Platl in 1767

Thus, initially, the old walls were not included in the new construction, but the plan was later modified to incorporate the adaptation of the old mosque wall. This required significant changes, especially to the support system. Instead of the originally planned brick pillars, stone blocks were used, while the dome was built of bricks. By then, 8,000 guilders had already been spent on earlier construction, leaving 34,000 guilders from the total approved budget of 42,000—an amount Steinlein considered necessary. However, these funds were never fully provided, and the fate of the money allocated in the 1750s remains unknown. The revised plans were submitted in May 1767, with drawings by Franz Anton Platl, a master mason from Timișoara, showing the church's ground plan, longitudinal section, and façade.

By autumn 1767, the church was nearly finished, with only the roof, spires, and façade remaining incomplete. That same year, prompted by central authorities in Vienna, the provincial administration resubmitted the plans for the new church in Timișoara—which was already under construction—along with a cost estimate of 19,594 florins and 33 kreuzers for repairing the deteriorated residence. The related correspondence concluded without clear approval of the funds. However, on 29 August 1767, Senior Priest Petrus Körner made a direct appeal to Maria Theresa for approval, and she ultimately granted her consent.

However, the church's completion was initially hindered because the approved funds were not released. By February 1768, repeated requests from the Jesuit Society of Timișoara "for the rehabilitation of their ruined residence and to meet the most urgent demands of the parish church" had been denied. The conflict was resolved again by Maria Theresa, who on 7 February 1768, however, wrote with an unyielding ultimatum from Vienna: "the Father Provincial is to be informed by decree that, notwithstanding my aerario... I would nevertheless be inclined ex speciali and pro ultimato to grant six thousand florins for the building: but in the event that the Jesuit Fathers were not satisfied with this, my will would be to incorporate the city parishes into the cathedral churches and to allow the Jesuit Fathers to allocate to them 2,280 florins from their current income for the maintenance of the necessary professors for the existing schools, 1,500 florins."

Apparently, this amount was still insufficient, as on 2 May 1769, the Jesuits submitted another request for 9,735 guilders and 10 kreuzers. The Chamber Construction Office forwarded this request to the local administration, which then appealed to the Imperial Treasury on 17 May 1769. The request was approved, and the expenses were to be covered by the Treasury. On 6 June 1769, Maria Theresa granted approval by decree to the Hofdeputation: "that the P. P. Jesuits in Timișoara should be provided with the materials necessary for the construction of their church in the so-called ex arial..."

Although the Jesuit parish church was completed by the end of 1769, the Jesuit residence remained unfinished due to the order's dissolution in 1773. The plans for this building had also been submitted by Franz Anton Platl in 1767. Following the dissolution of the order, its members were incorporated into the Diocese of Cenad, where they continued to fulfill their esteemed mission.

=== Seminary ===
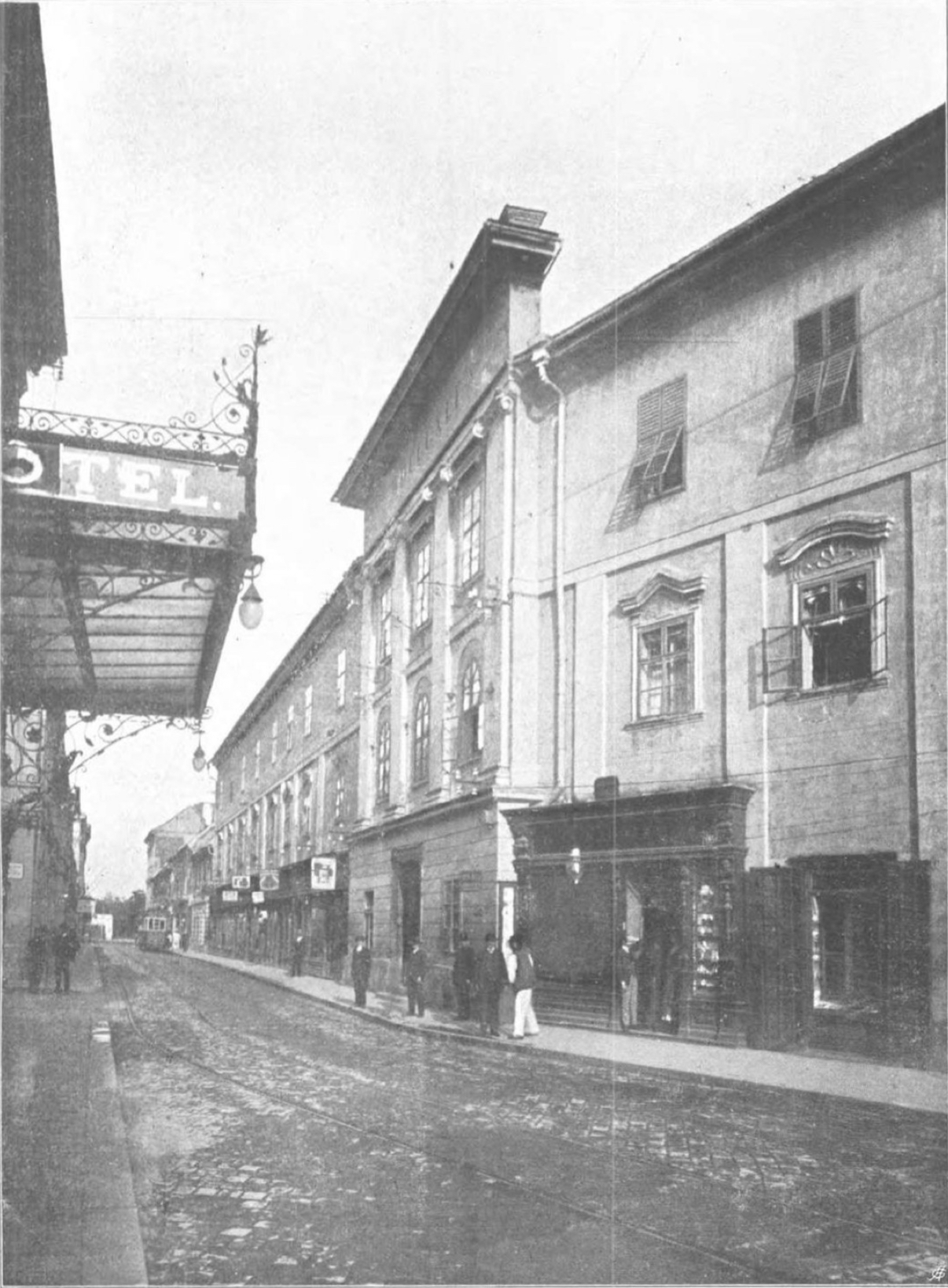
The Catholic Seminary in 1908

In the tenth year following the city's reconquest, the Jesuits established three gymnasium classes. By 1726, under the leadership of priest and professor Péter Miszeni, alongside Ferdinand Augustin Hallerstein—an expert in mathematics and natural sciences who instructed military officers in construction and hydraulic engineering—they were responsible for draining the city's marshlands and directing the waters into the Bega and Timiș rivers, as well as designing and constructing the seemingly impregnable fortress of Timișoara. The initial three gymnasium classes were expanded in 1744 with the addition of a fourth, and in 1763 with a fifth, operating under the name "Gymnasium Temesvariense Soc. Iesu." Beginning in 1764–1765, the school operated consistently, and in May 1768, it was visited by Emperor Joseph II and his co-ruler, his mother Maria Theresa, during their visit to Timișoara.

Following the abolition of the Jesuit order, oversight of the seminary was transferred to the diocesan authorities and the imperial administration. Beginning in 1806, the Jesuit house served as the location for the Roman Catholic theological seminary, the first institution of higher education in Timișoara.

The Baroque seminary building was expanded according to plans drawn up by master builder Anton Schmidt on 13 February 1836, with construction completed in 1841. From 1845 to 1848, this building housed the Law Academy, the first higher education institution in Timișoara, which comprised two faculties: philosophy and law. The academy was closed in 1848, with contemporary documents indicating that its closure resulted from insubordination towards the church and military authorities, who viewed the intelligentsia with suspicion, believing them to harbor pro-revolutionary sympathies.

=== Emericanum ===
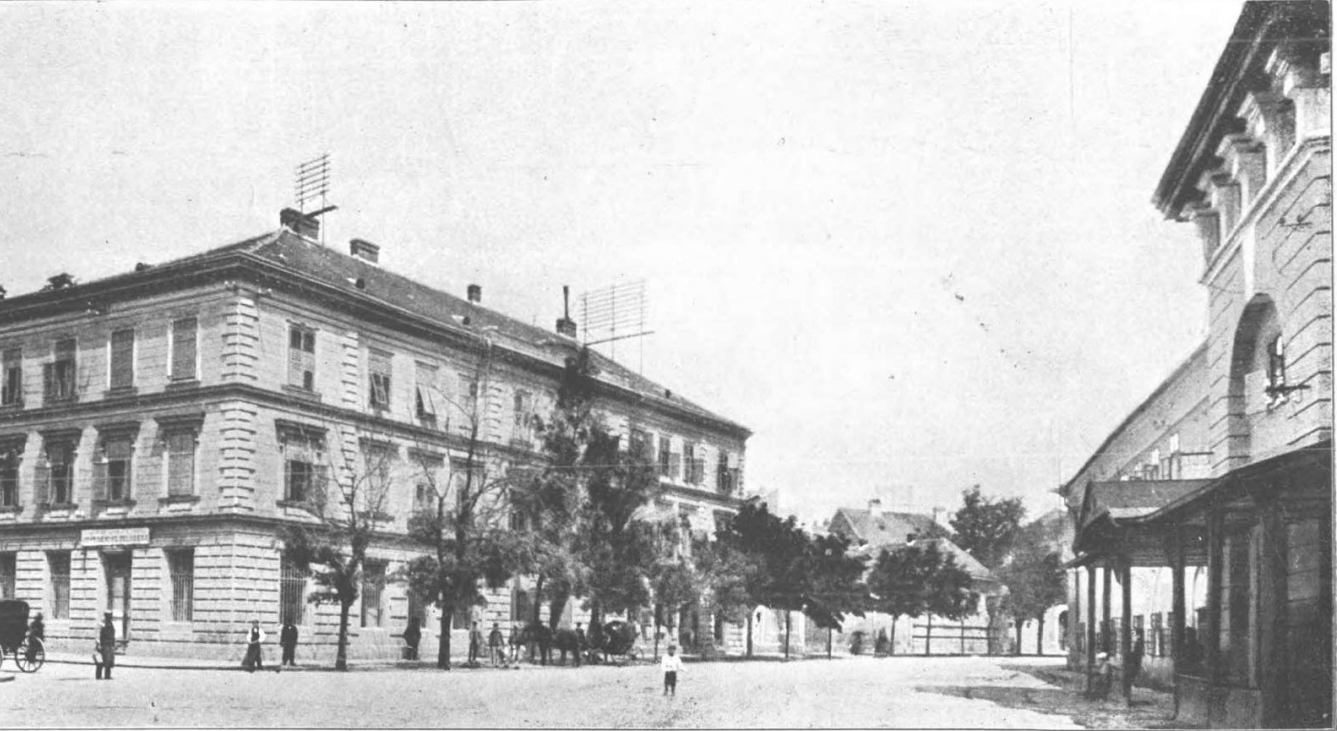
Emericanum and Transylvania Barracks

Emericanum (Latin: Convictus Episcopalis ad Sanctum Emericum) was an episcopal boarding school located in St. George Square, near St. George Church and the Transylvania Barracks. The institution was intended for the education of students preparing for an ecclesiastical career and was organized in accordance with the principles established by the Council of Trent, which encouraged the establishment of minor seminaries to cultivate religious education and discipline from an early age.

The initiative to establish this seminary belonged to Bishop Sándor Csajághy, who, beginning in 1854, admitted the first students recruited from elementary schools. In 1858, the bishop established a foundation of 5,000 florins for the Seminarium puerorum, while his successor, Bishop Sándor Bonnaz, sought to alleviate the shortage of priests within the Diocese of Cenad by supporting the expansion of the institution through a donation of 100,000 florins and the construction of a separate building on the grounds of the theological seminary in Timișoara.

Placed under the patronage of Saint Emeric, Emericanum was inaugurated between 1874 and 1875 and operated within the seminary complex located near St. George Square. The institution shared its administration with the theological seminary, while maintaining its own pedagogue, and its students followed a discipline and daily routine similar to that of seminarians.

=== Demolition ===
In 1913, the authorities decided to demolish the church and the Catholic seminary, with the demolition taking place in 1914, shortly before the outbreak of World War I and the death of the then-mayor, Carol Telbisz. The church's demolition was justified by the plan to widen the fortress's east–west axis. Local authorities, guided by city expansion plans developed by architects Emil Szilárd and Josef Briger, aimed to create a broad boulevard stretching from Mehala to Fabric. This project was driven by increasing traffic demands and the city's modernization efforts, which ultimately led to its defortification.

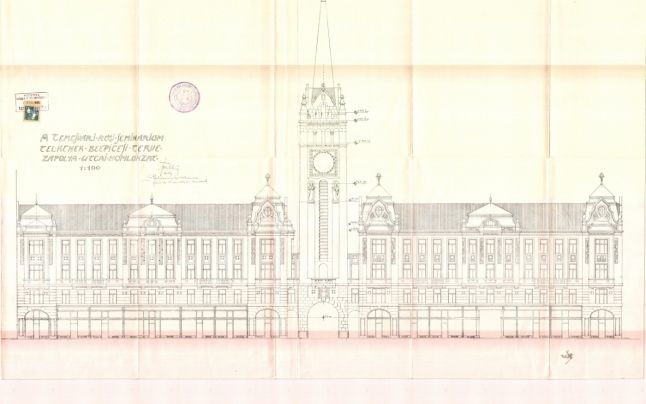
The 1914 reorganization plan for St. George Square

The plan also involved reorganizing St. George Square by constructing two symmetrical buildings separated by a new church. On 14 October 1914, the Roman Catholic Diocese obtained a building permit for the two houses and the church. The plan was never realized due to the outbreak of World War I and its aftermath, during which Timișoara transitioned from Austria-Hungary to Romania.

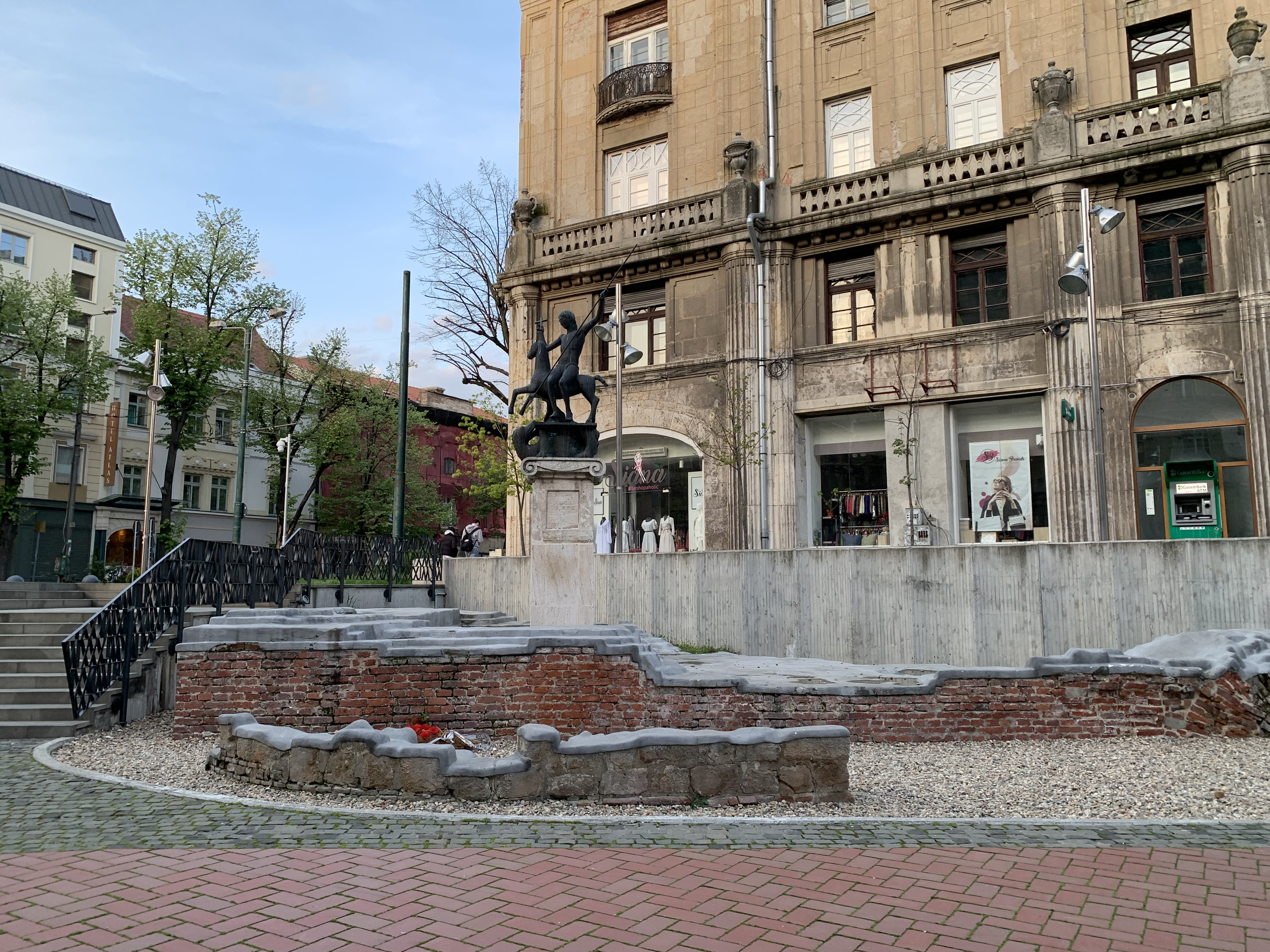
The ruins of the former mosque and former churches in 2023

Following the demolition of St. George Church, the Banat House Society building (Szana Bank) was constructed on the site of the former structures, based on a design by architect Ernő Foerk, with a building permit dated 10 October 1914. After World War I, the design was revised by architect Josef Kremmer Jr., who obtained a new building permit on 1 October 1921.

In a 1956 article, architect Gheorghe Bleyer attributed the disappearance of the two buildings primarily to the greed of the priests, alleging that they were influenced by banks to sell the properties.
