= Holy Trinity Cathedral, Arad =

Romanian orthodox cathedral

Coordinates: 46°11′0.94″N 21°19′29″E

Arad Holy Trinity Archbishopric Cathedral Catedrala Arhiepiscopală Sfânta Treime din Arad
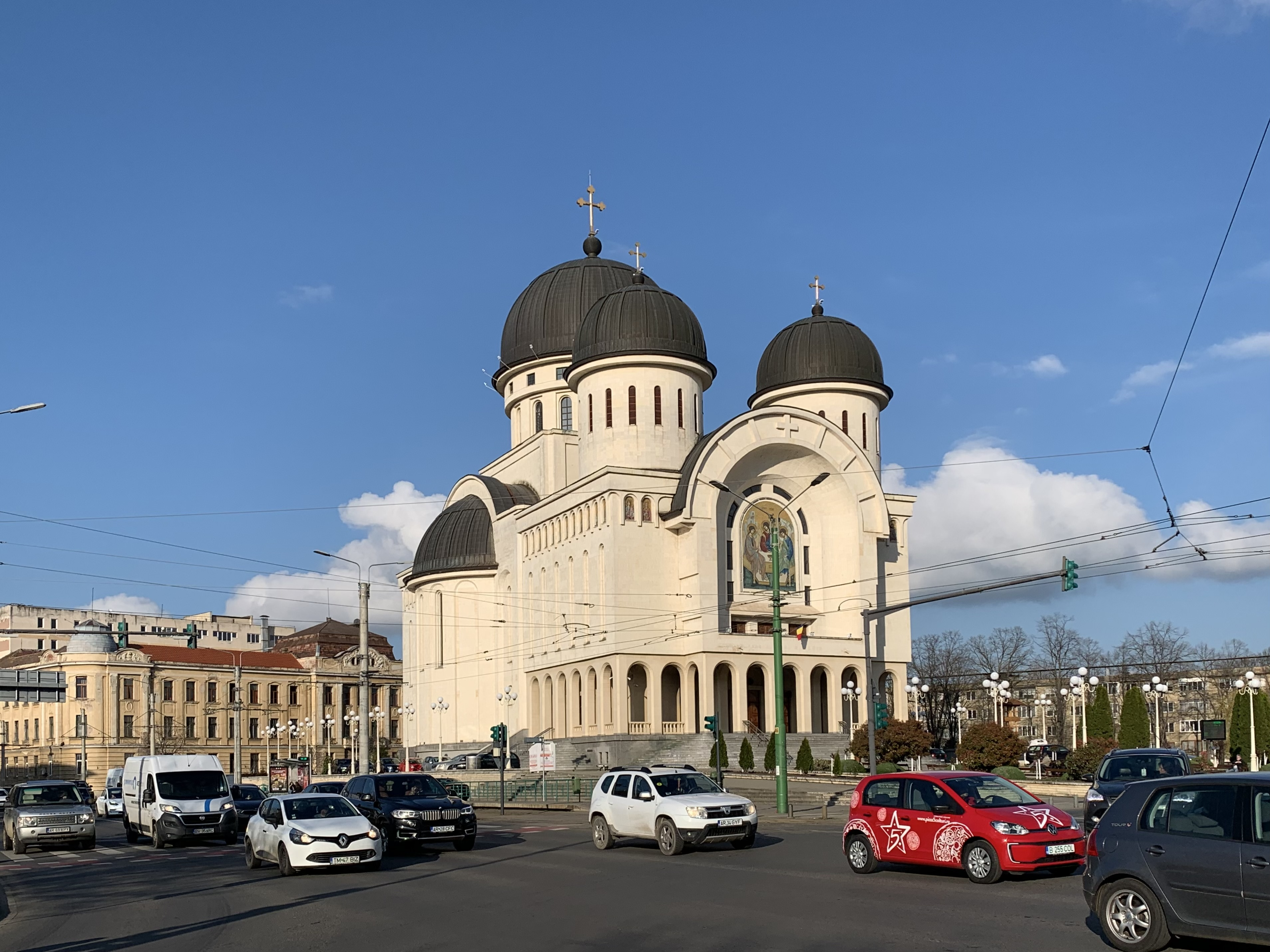
- Arad Orthodox Cathedral facade, 2023

Religion
- Affiliation: Romanian Orthodox Church
- Region: Crișana
- Rite: Eastern Orthodox
- Ecclesiastical or organizational status: Metropolis of Banat
- Year consecrated: 2008
- Status: Archdiocesan cathedral

Location
- Location: Arad
- Municipality: Arad
- State: Romania
- Interactive map of Arad Holy Trinity; Archbishopric Cathedral; Catedrala Arhiepiscopală; Sfânta Treime din Arad

Architecture
- Architect: Ioan Hăprian
- Type: Cathedral
- Style: Byzantine, Roman
- Groundbreaking: 24 November 1991
- Completed: still under construction; currently painting the interior
- Construction cost: ~ US$7 million

Specifications
- Direction of façade: South
- Length: 63 m
- Width: 36 m
- Height (max): 58 m

The 'Holy Trinity' Orthodox Cathedral (Romanian: Catedrala "Sfânta Treime" din Arad) is a Romanian Orthodox cathedral in Arad, in the Crișana region of western Romania. It is the main cathedral of the episcopal see of Arad, currently headed by Timotei, Archbishop of Arad.

== History ==
The cornerstone of the new cathedral was laid by the bishop, Timotei in November 1991. Proper construction efforts started in 1992, when the work started on consolidating the ground and the foundation of the new church. Construction lasted until 2006, when the last exterior works were being made and the large front icon was completed.

Long before construction has ended, due to the specific of the church, bells were brought in from a foundry in Innsbruck, Austria. With a summed mass of 6.56 tons, respectively 4050, 1070, 745, 450 and 250 kg for the five bells, they were mounted in December 2003. In 2006 the cathedral had 4 golden crosses mounted upon its domes. The three small crosses measured 3,5 meters each and the large one was 7,30 meters high.

== Inauguration ==
On the feast of Saint Nicholas, in 2008, the cathedral was inaugurated by the Patriarch of All Romania, Daniel. A gathering of clergy and believers took part in the blessing of the church and its inauguration. As the cathedral has been built, a temporary altar above the ground, but at the same time underneath the floor of the nave and subsequently under the main altar was used for celebrating liturgy, was blessed at the same time during the inauguration and kept as a permanent installation.

== See also ==
- List of largest Orthodox cathedrals
- Church of the Nativity of Saint John the Baptist (Arad, Romania), the previous cathedral
