= Roman Ciorogariu =

Imperial Austrian-born Romanian bishop, journalist and educator

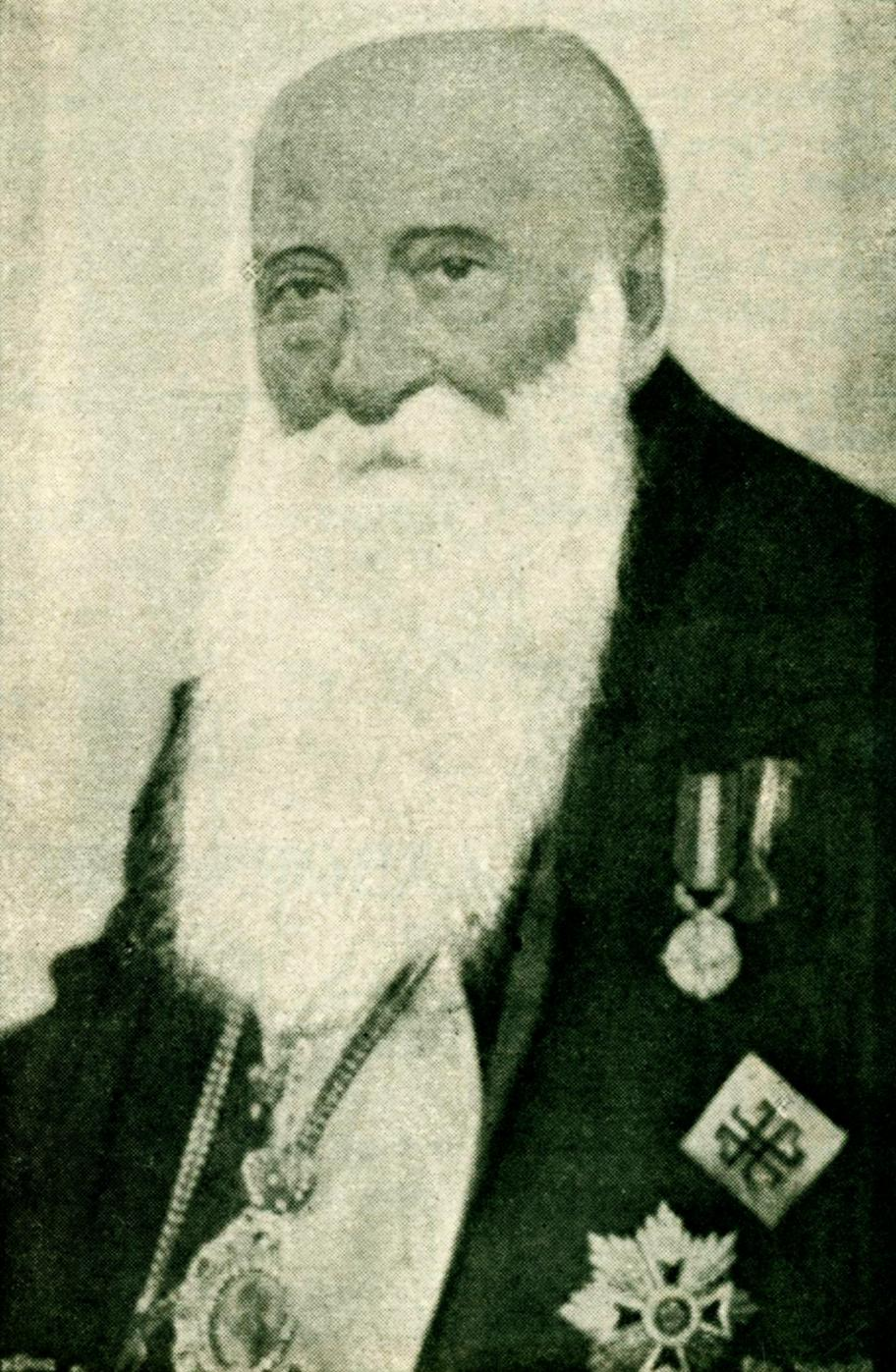
Roman Ciorogariu

Roman Ciorogariu (Romanian pronunciation: [ˈroman tʃjoroɡaˈri.u]; born Romul Ciorogariu; December 6, 1852 – January 21, 1936) was an Imperial Austrian-born Romanian bishop within the Romanian Orthodox Church, as well as a journalist and educator.

== Biography ==
Born in Pecica, he attended high school in Arad, Pozsony and Hódmezővásárhely, followed by theology studies in Arad from 1874 to 1877. Between 1877 and 1879, he took specialized courses in pedagogy and psychology at Leipzig University, and in theology and philosophy at the University of Bonn. From 1879 to 1881, he was a clerk for the Arad Diocese. From 1881 to 1889 and again from 1892 to 1917, he taught at Arad's theological and pedagogical institute, which he directed from 1901 to 1917.

Taking the name Roman, he was tonsured a monk in 1900, simultaneously being ordained a hieromonk. He was elevated to protosingel in 1904 and archimandrite in 1917. From 1917 to 1920, he was bishop's vicar at Oradea. Ciorogariu then became the first bishop of the Oradea Diocese: elected in October 1920, he was consecrated in March 1921 and enthroned that October, remaining in office until his death. In this role, he organized the new diocese, purchased a bishop's residence, and founded Legea Românească newsletter (1921), a four-year theological academy (1923), a school for church singers, a printing press and a monastery at Izbuc.

Under Austro-Hungarian rule, he was active in the Romanian national movement, particularly in the press; his hundreds of articles covered politics, society and religion. Notably, at Arad, he helped found Tribuna Poporului in 1897 and edited Biserica și Școala from 1901 to 1917. He belonged to the executive committee of the Romanian National Party. Following the union of Transylvania with Romania, he led the Romanian National Council for Bihor County from 1918 to 1919. From 1920 to 1936, Ciorogariu sat in the Romanian Senate, and in 1921 was elected an honorary member of the Romanian Academy.
