= Andrei Magieru =

Austro-Hungarian-born Romanian cleric

Andrei Magieru (born Aurelian Magieru; June 27, 1891 – May 13, 1960) was an Austro-Hungarian-born Romanian cleric who became a bishop within the Romanian Orthodox Church.

Born into a priest's family in Saturău, Arad County, in the Crișana region, Magieru attended a gymnasium in Arad and Beiuș. He then attended the theology faculty at Czernowitz University from 1909 to 1913, obtaining a doctorate in 1916. He began but did not complete studies at the literature faculty of Budapest University. From 1914 to 1917, he was rector of the diocesan boarding school in Beiuș. From 1917 to 1921, he was secretary of the Orthodox consistory at Oradea. He took part in the events surrounding the union of Transylvania with Romania and served as Bihor County delegate to the foreign military mission at Oradea. From 1921 to 1926, he was an adviser to the new Oradea Diocese.

In 1918, Magieru was ordained a celibate deacon, becoming a priest in 1922. In 1924, he was made a monk at Sinaia Monastery, taking the name Andrei. Later that year, he became protosyncellus, rising to archimandrite in 1925. In 1926, he became vicar bishop of Oradea, taking the title Crișanul and serving under Roman Ciorogariu. Meanwhile, he edited the diocesan newsletter Legea Românească from 1921 to 1923. From that year until 1936, he was a rector and professor of New Testament studies at the Oradea theological academy.

Elected Bishop of Arad in December 1935, Magieru was enthroned the following February, remaining until his death. In 1936, he joined Patriarch Miron Cristea on a delegation to England. In 1951, he was part of a group that visited the Moscow Patriarchate. Between 1941 and 1944, during The Holocaust, he safeguarded a number of Jews. His works include a lithographed New Testament course, as well as articles, sermons, reviews, and pastoral letters in Legea Românească and, at Arad, Biserica și Școala.
