= Timotei Seviciu =

- Church: Romanian Orthodox Church
- Archdiocese: Arad
- Installed: 1984
- Predecessor: Visarion Aștileanu

Personal details
- Born: Traian Petru Sevici; 4 June 1936 (age 89) Timișoara
- Denomination: Eastern Orthodox Church
- Profession: Theologian

Timotei Seviciu (Romanian pronunciation: [timoˈtej ˈsevit͡ʃʲu]; born Traian Petru Sevici [traˈjan ˈpetru ˈsevit͡ʃʲ] on 4 June 1936 in Timișoara) is a hierarch of the Romanian Orthodox Church, since 1984 the bishop and since 2009 the archbishop of the Arad Archdiocese.
