= Grigorie Comșa =

Austro-Hungarian-born Romanian cleric

Grigorie Gh. Comșa (Romanian pronunciation: [ɡriˈɡori.e ˈɡe ˈkomʃa]; born Gheorghe Comșa; May 13, 1889–May 25, 1935) was an Austro-Hungarian-born Romanian cleric who became a bishop within the Romanian Orthodox Church.

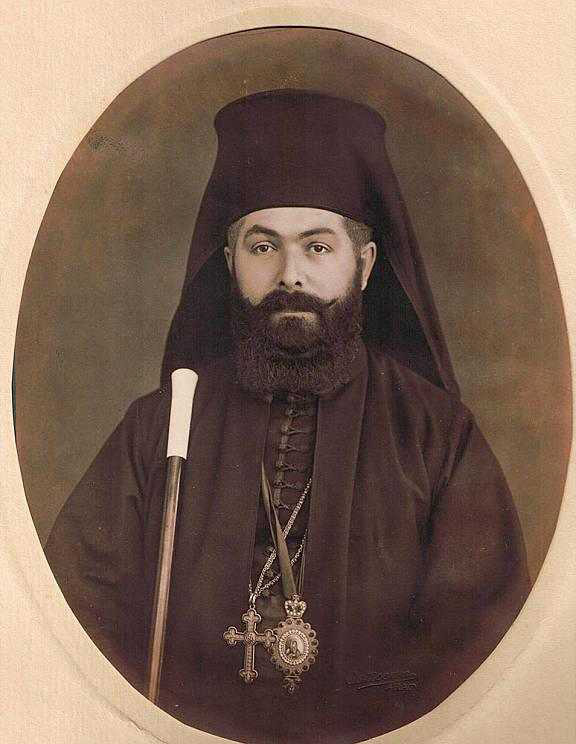
A portrait of Grigorie Comşa

Born in Comăna de Sus, Brașov County, in the Transylvania region, he went to the village church school where his father taught for over thirty years. He then attended the state Hungarian gymnasium in nearby Făgăraș from 1900 to 1908, and went to the Sibiu theological institute from 1908 to 1911. On a scholarship from the Sibiu Archdiocese, he studied at the law faculty of the University of Budapest from 1911 to 1915, obtaining a doctorate. Meanwhile, he attended the faculty of Catholic theology. He later studied theology at the University of Bucharest, taking an undergraduate degree in 1921 and a doctorate in 1925.

Ordained in September 1915 as an unmarried deacon by Ioan Mețianu, he served at the Sibiu Orthodox Cathedral. Having previously published articles there, from January to September 1918, he was interim editor of Telegraful Român. From 1918 to 1919, following the union of Transylvania with Romania, he was a secretary at the presidency of the Directing Council, the temporary authority in the province. From 1920 to 1925, he was an administrator within the Religious Affairs and Arts Ministry. During these years, residing in the national capital Bucharest, he was a deacon at the Amzei Church. In 1920, he was elected to the Assembly of Deputies, serving in the second legislature of Greater Romania.

In May 1925, he was elected Bishop of Arad, tonsured a monk at Sinaia Monastery and took the name Grigorie. He was consecrated bishop in June and enthroned the following month, serving until his death. In 1934, he was elected an honorary member of the Romanian Academy. He also belonged to the Romanian Writers' Society and the syndicate of Banat journalists, and was part of Astra's central committee. Although a tall and energetic man, a severe illness kept him in bed for several weeks, and he died at the age of 46. He was buried alongside previous bishops of Arad at the Hodoș-Bodrog Monastery.

During his time as bishop, Comșa was appreciated for his oratory and missionary spirit. He countered efforts at conversion by Protestant denominations, initiated several series of theological and moral works, guided the theological academy in Arad and oversaw the diocesan bulletin Biserica și Şcoala. He published some 75 works, including books of sermons and anti-Protestant pamphlets. He was probably the foremost Orthodox polemicist against Pentecostalism, complaining that the group continued to meet secretly after being denied official recognition.
