= Joanikije Martinović =

17th-century bishop of the Serbian Orthodox Church

Joanikije Martinović. (Serbian Cyrillic: Јоаникије Мартиновић) was a 17th-century bishop of the Serbian Orthodox Church of Aradsko-jenopoljska eparhija (Archdiocese of Arad and Jenopolje) from 1710 to 1721, now defunct. Between 1695 and 1865, the bishops in Arad were under the Serbian jurisdiction of the Metropolitanate of Karlovci.

In 1713, Bishop Joanikije Martinović was forced under pressure by the Austrian Roman Catholic authorities to accept the union, but he did it only pro forma, though without ever fulfilling the requirements demanded. His greatest rival at the time, Jovan Tekelija, who openly accused him of helping to spread the union in the Arad bishopric.

There is a plaque at the door of the Serbian Orthodox Church of Saints Peter and Paul in Arad inscribed: "Bishop Joanikije Martinović died on 24 October 1720, and Sofronije Podgoričanin also died in 1726"
