= St. George Square, Timișoara =

Square in Timișoara, Romania

St. George Square
- City square
- {{{other_names}}}
- Piața Sf. Gheorghe
- Former name: Seminary Square
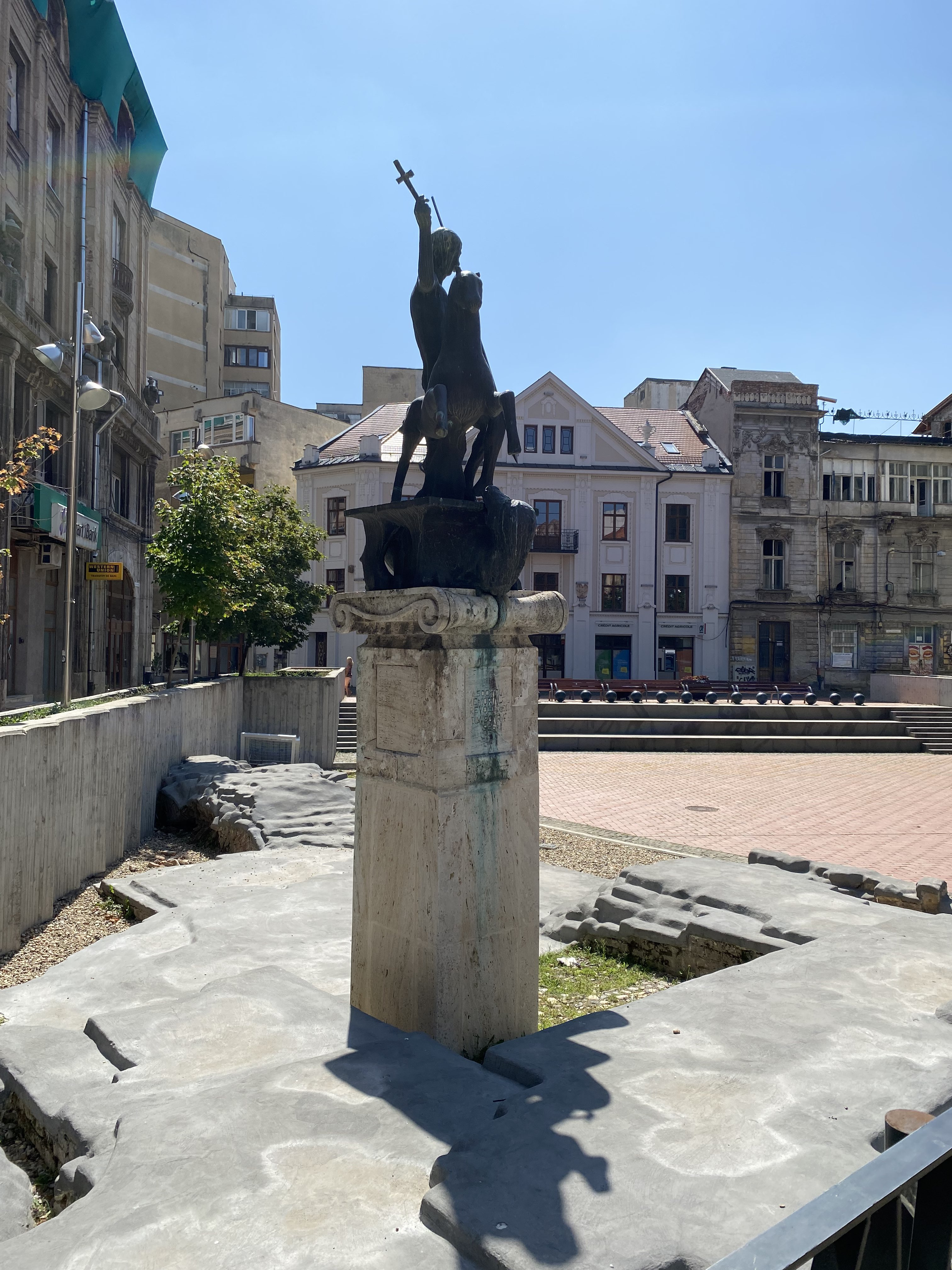
- St. George and the Dragon and the ruins of the medieval mosque
- Length: 117.93 m
- Location: Cetate, Timișoara
- Interactive map of St. George Square
- Coordinates: 45°45′20.35″N 21°13′43.61″E

St. George Square (Romanian: Piața Sf. Gheorghe) (Note: Hungarian: Szent György tér; German: St.-Georgs-Platz; Serbian: Трг Светог Ђорђа, romanized: Trg Svetog Đorđa) is a small urban square in the historic center of Timișoara. The place was known in the past as Seminary Square; there was first a Catholic church, which later became a mosque during the Ottoman occupation, and after the installation of the Austrian administration the building was handed over to the Jesuits who opened a new church, dedicated to St. George. Surrounded by imposing buildings, the square has long been the spiritual, financial and cultural center of the fortress of Timișoara.

== History ==
St. George Square is the smallest of all three squares in the historic center of Timișoara. The forerunner of today's square was built around the Jesuit Church in the 18th century, under the name of Jesuit Square, and had an irregular shape. Its sides conformed to the new street plot, but the orientation of the church on the diagonal led to the formation of two triangular squares, when the current Cetate district was completely rebuilt by the Austrians. The streets were arranged according to a rectangular plan, with a new orientation, and that of the new buildings was, in turn, different from those built in previous eras. Subsequently, the market bore various names: Sankt-Georgs-Platz, Szent György tér, Ion C. Brătianu or Vasile Roaită during the communist years.

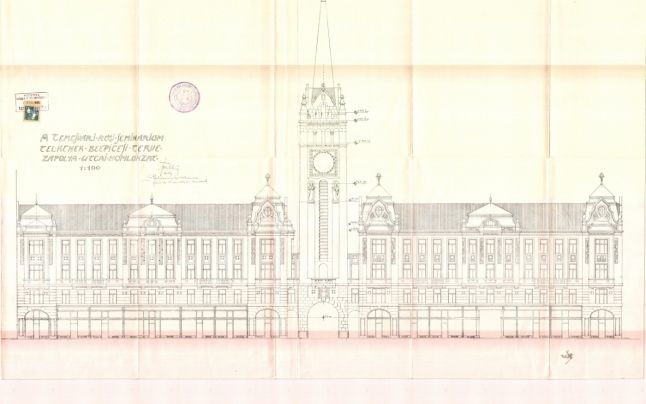
The 1914 reorganization plan for St. George Square

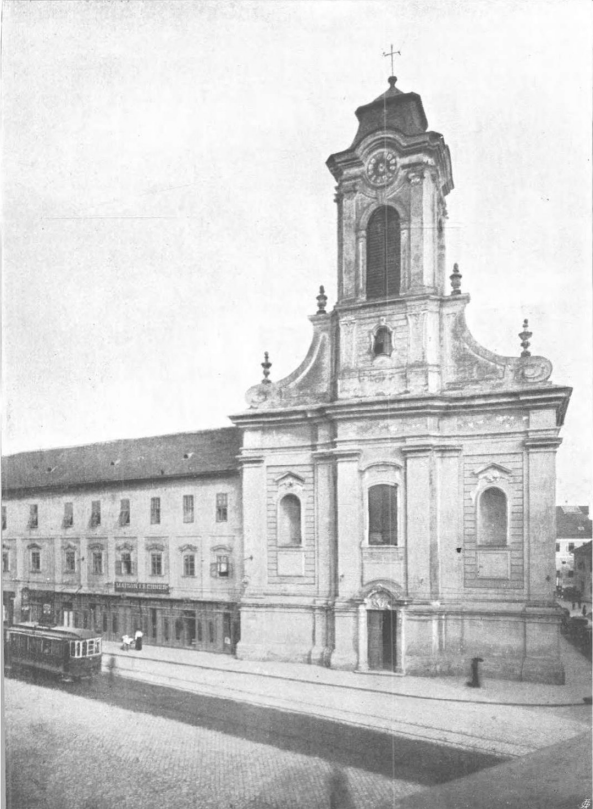
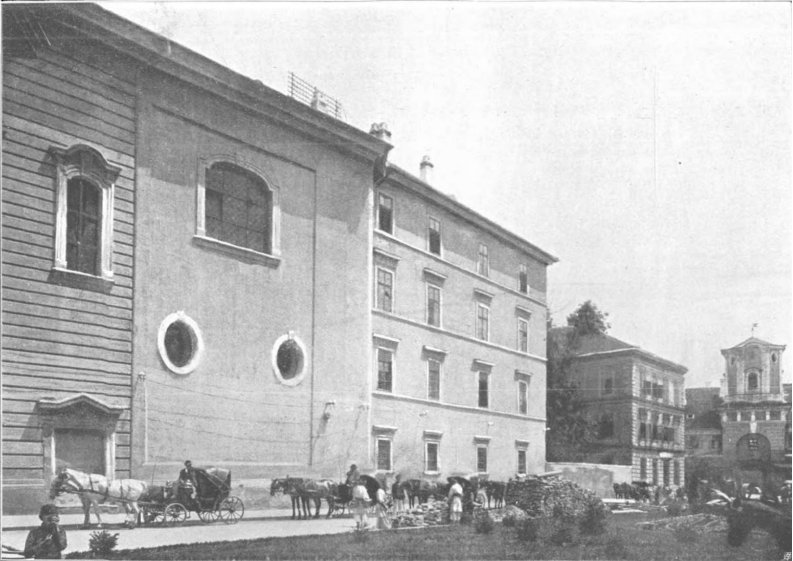
St. George Church (left), the Seminary and the Emericanum at the beginning of the 20th century

Here was a Catholic church, first mentioned in the 15th century, during the Kingdom of Hungary. It was transformed into a mosque during the Eyalet of Temeşvar. After the establishment of the Austrian administration, the building was handed over to the Jesuits (who arrived in Timișoara in 1718) and reopened as a church, after repairs and a major facelift that gave it a Baroque style; eventually, the old building had to be demolished (1739) and a new church was built. Meanwhile, the Jesuit order was dissolved in 1773. The church complex was later completed with a Jesuit House. The Roman Catholic Theological Seminary, the first higher education institution in Timișoara, functioned in this building since 1806. Also, between 1845 and 1848, the house hosted the first law and philosophy faculty in Banat. Both buildings were demolished between 1913 and 1914. The demolition was justified by plans to widen the fortress's east-west axis, as part of a broader city expansion project led by architects Emil Szilárd and Josef Briger. The plan envisioned a wide boulevard connecting Mehala to Fabric, driven by both increasing traffic and the city's push for modernization, which eventually led to its defortification. It also included the redesign of St. George Square, featuring two symmetrical buildings flanking a newly constructed church. However, the project was never realized due to the outbreak of World War I and its aftermath, during which Timișoara transitioned from Austria-Hungary to Romania.

In their place, Josef Kremer Jr. designed the Szana Palace. Today it houses several cultural institutions as well as branches of the Writers' Union of Romania and Banca Transilvania. The first bank palace in the city was built on the western side of the square in 1855, when it became the headquarters of the First House of Savings (German: Erste Temeswarer Sparkassa). Klapka-Kossak House, home to Timișoara's first meteorological observatory (1783–1803) and then one of the largest and most modern photographic studios in the empire, owned by Josef Kossak-Bohr (1885–1922), borders the square to the east. Initially, the construction of a hotel was also desired, but during the siege of the Pasoptist revolutionaries on the fortress, the construction collapsed, killing two workers.

In St. George Square, the first horse-drawn tram was set in motion in July 1869. Here was to be the end of the line that connected the fortress to the Fabric district. Later, a second line was put into use, which started from St. George Square, bypassed the fortress and reached the railway station through the Iosefin district.

In 1996, an equestrian statue of St. George fighting the dragon was erected in the center of the square. Created by sculptor Silvia Radu, the monument commemorates the children killed during the 1989 Revolution. In 2015, the square was remodeled as an amphitheater where the walls of the Jesuit church and fragments of the former mosque were exhibited.
