= Alexandru Mocioni Square =

Square in Timișoara, Romania

Alexandru Mocioni Square Piața Alexandru Mocioni
- City square
- Former name(s): Küttl Square • Sinaia Square
- Length: 370.38 m
- Owner: Timișoara City Hall
- Location: Timișoara, Romania
- Coordinates: 45°44′48″N 21°12′59.5″E

The Alexandru Mocioni Square is a triangular square in Timișoara. It was named after politician Alexandru Mocioni (1841–1909), who at that time represented the Romanian minority in the Hungarian Parliament. The square is located in the Iosefin district, on the border with the Elisabetin district. The square is dominated by the Church of the Nativity, an Orthodox church completed in 1936.

== History ==
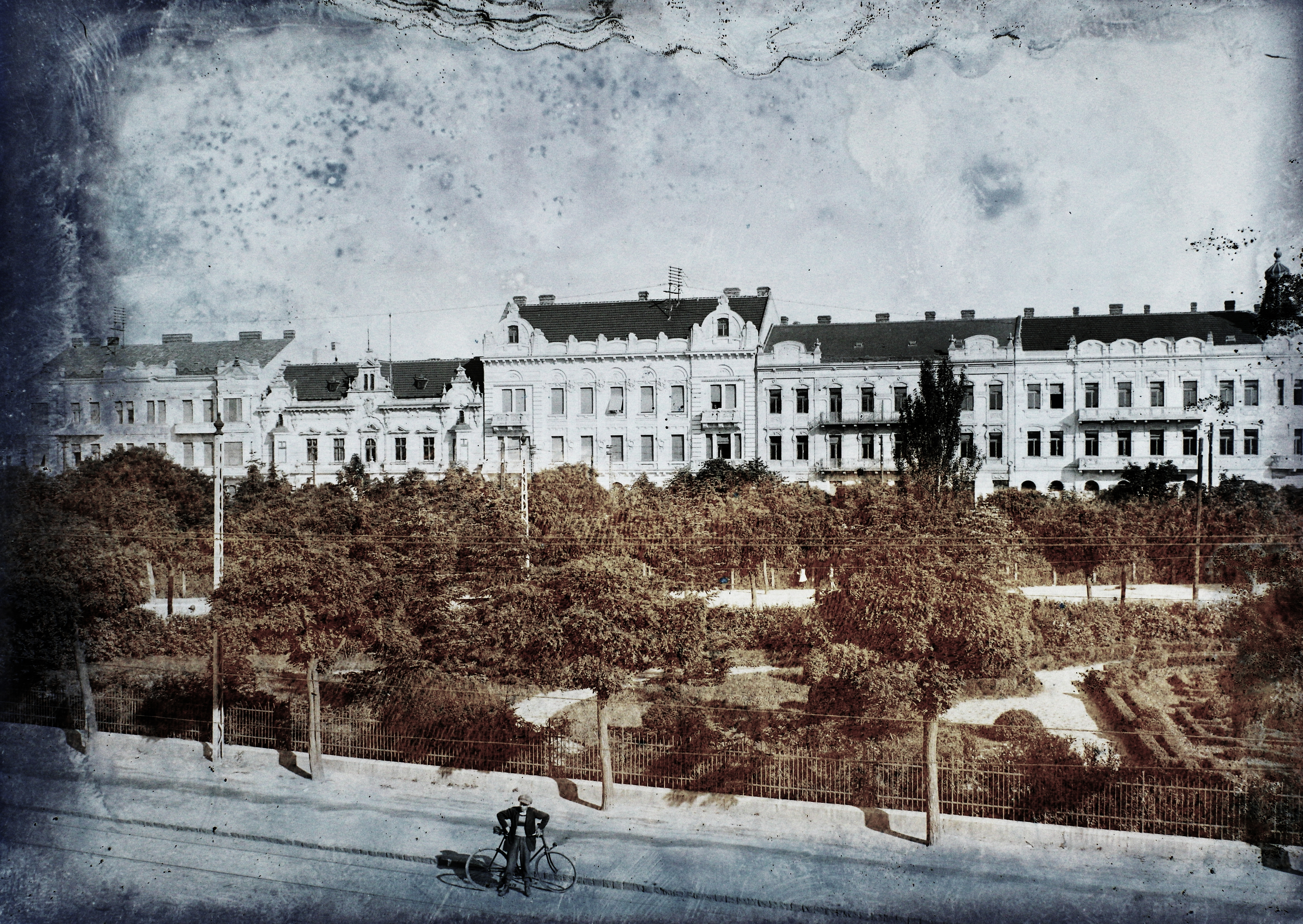
Küttl Square (present-day Alexandru Mocioni Square) in 1910, seen from the south side. The park here is now occupied by the Iosefin Orthodox Church.

Until 1868, the land where the square lies today was included in the so-called esplanade of the fortress, a 949-meter-wide strip of land with a construction ban. In 1868 it was decided to reduce the esplanade to 569 meters, almost half of its original width, a decision that allowed the outer historic districts (Iosefin, Elisabetin and Fabric) to get near the city. Prior to this year, there had been only temporary and production-related constructions, namely the steam-powered sawmill and the von Gotthilf family's wood depot.

The urban plans made at the end of the 19th century will define the character of the street structure in this area, by continuing the initial rectangular plot of the historical nucleus of the Iosefin district. The original space of the square was defined as a rectangular space similar to the squares in the other historic areas of the city, based on the orthogonal street structure, with rectangular lots of similar size facing the short side of the square. From a territorial point of view, however, 16 December 1989 Boulevard (formerly 6 March and Hunyadi) has always been the border between Iosefin and Elisabetin districts. Alexandru Mocioni Square is segmented by the boulevard into two distinct parts, of unequal shape and area. These two parts, from an administrative point of view, have always been separated as belonging and even had different names. The northwestern fragment, belonging to the Iosefin district and having a triangular shape, was initially named Küttl Square, after the name of a mayor of Timișoara of English origin, and later Sinaia Square. At the same time, the southeastern fragment, having a trapezoidal shape and being initially organized as an urban park, belonged to the Elisabetin district and was initially called Joseph Square, and later Asănești Square.

The built-up area of the Küttl Square develops over time before the rest of the square. In 1894, the municipality became the owner of the land on the former esplanade, but tried unsuccessfully to find buyers for the new plots offered for sale. As a solution to the lack of attractiveness of the area proposed for development, the municipality decides to build with its own funds the Palace of the Pension Fund (1896–1897), a monumental palace that functioned as a house of report. The action fully achieves its purpose, so that by the end of 1896 five plots in the vicinity of the palace are sold; after 1901, the southern front of the square, belonging to the Elisabetin district, is also occupied by buildings.

The construction in 1921 of the Romanian Orthodox Church on the land of the former park from the fragment belonging to the Elisabetin district, as well as the physical separation determined by 16 December 1989 Boulevard lead to the difficulty of perceiving the urban ensemble of the square as a whole, as it was initially defined.

== Palaces ==
The southern front of Alexandru Mocioni Square is flanked by a series of palaces built at the beginning of the 20th century in Secession and eclectic/neobaroque styles. From east to west they are:

- Dauerbach Palace (1901, eclectic)
- Karl Hart House (1901, eclectic with neobaroque and neoclassical influences)
- Jakob Fischer House (1910, szecesszió)
- Béla Fiatska Palaces (1910–1911, szecesszió)
