= Archdiocese of Arad =

Romanian Orthodox eparchy in Arad, Romania

Archbishop of Arad
- Archbishopric

orthodox
- Incumbent; Dr. Timotei Seviciu

Location
- Country: Romania

Information
- Established: 1706
- Diocese: Arad
- Cathedral: Holy Trinity Cathedral, Cathedral of St. John the Baptist

Website
- arhiepiscopiaaradului.ro

The Archdiocese or Archbishopric of Arad (Romanian: Arhiepiscopia Aradului), formerly the Bishopric of Arad (Romanian: Episcopia Aradului, Serbian: Арадска епархија) is an episcopal see of the Romanian Orthodox Church, under the administration of the Metropolis of Banat, with jurisdiction over Arad County in Romania. The current head is bishop Timotei Seviciu.

== History ==
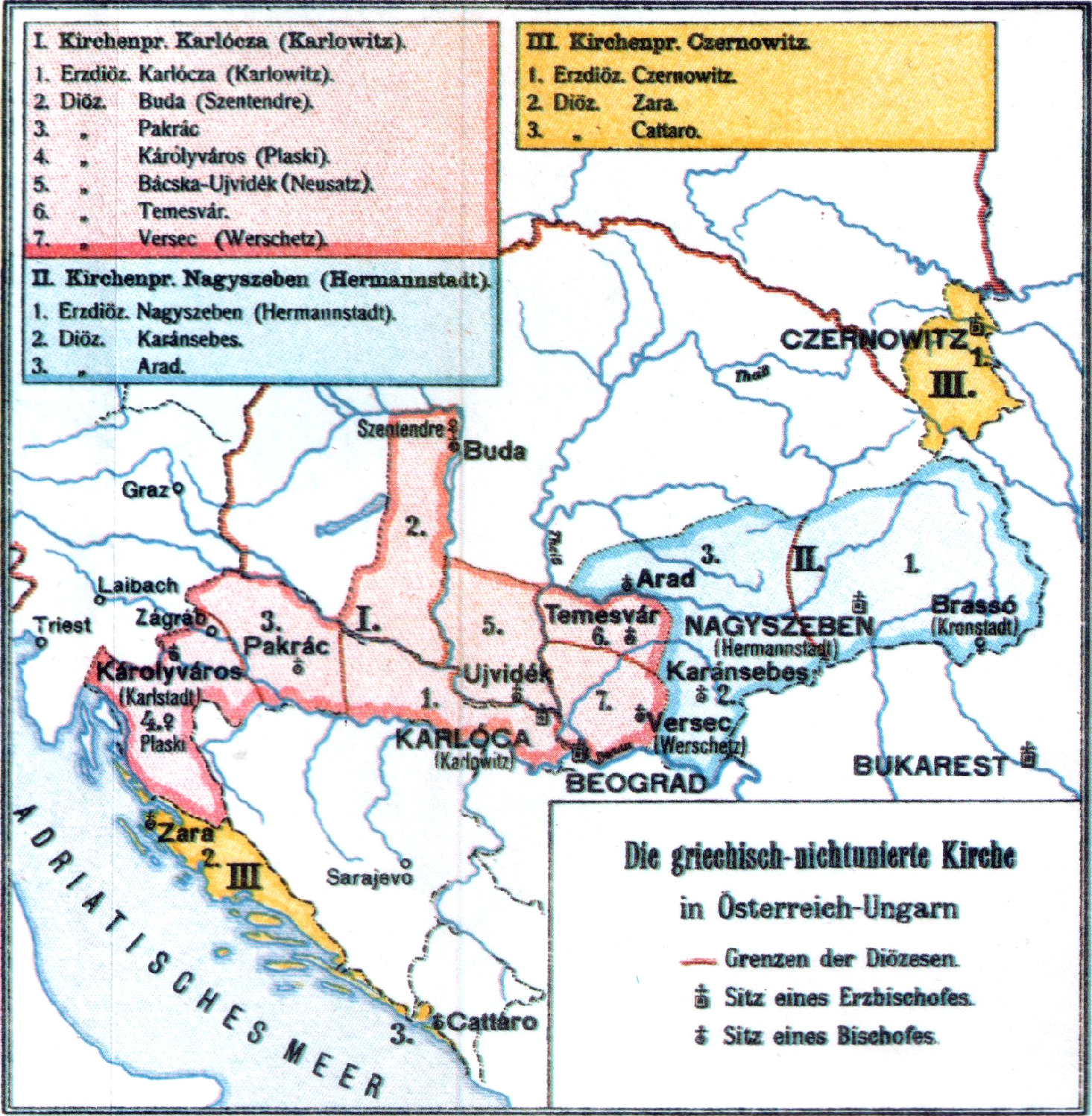
Eastern Orthodox metropolitanates and eparchies in Austria-Hungary in 1909.

The history of Eastern Orthodox Christianity on the territory of the present-day bishopric dates back to late Antiquity and early Middle Ages. During the later medieval periods, authorities of the Kingdom of Hungary had an ambivalent attitude towards the presence of Eastern Orthodox Christians in southern and eastern regions of the realm. During the period of the Ottoman rule, from the middle of the 16th century to the end of the 17th century, the region of Arad was under ecclesiastical jurisdiction of the Serbian Patriarchate of Peć.

The Eparchy of Arad in its modern form was created after the Great Turkish War (1683-1699), when the city of Arad and its region became part of the Habsburg monarchy, and thus covered by privileges granted by Habsburg rulers to their Eastern Orthodox subjects, both Serbs and Romanians. In 1708, bishop Isaija of Arad was elected Metropolitan of Krušedol, and during 18th century and up to the middle of 19th century, Bishopric of Arad was under jurisdiction of the Metropolitanate of Karlovci.

Eparchy of Arad also had an important regional vicariate (exarchate) in the city of Oradea. Majority of Eastern Orthodox Christians of this Eparchy were ethnic Romanians and minority were ethnic Serbs and Greeks. Following the will of the majority of people, the Eparchy of Arad was transferred in 1865 from jurisdiction of the Patriarchate of Karlovci to the jurisdiction of the newly created Metropolis of Sibiu. The Eastern Orthodox Romanians of the Patriarchate of Karlovci separated and were transferred to the newly created Metropolis of Sibiu through mutual agreement that included the transfer of the Eparchy of Arad and eastern parts of eparchies of Temišvar and Vršac. After World War I and the creation of united Romania, it became part of the united Romanian Orthodox Church. In 2009, the bishopric was elevated to an archbishopric under the Metropolis of Banat.

== Bishops ==
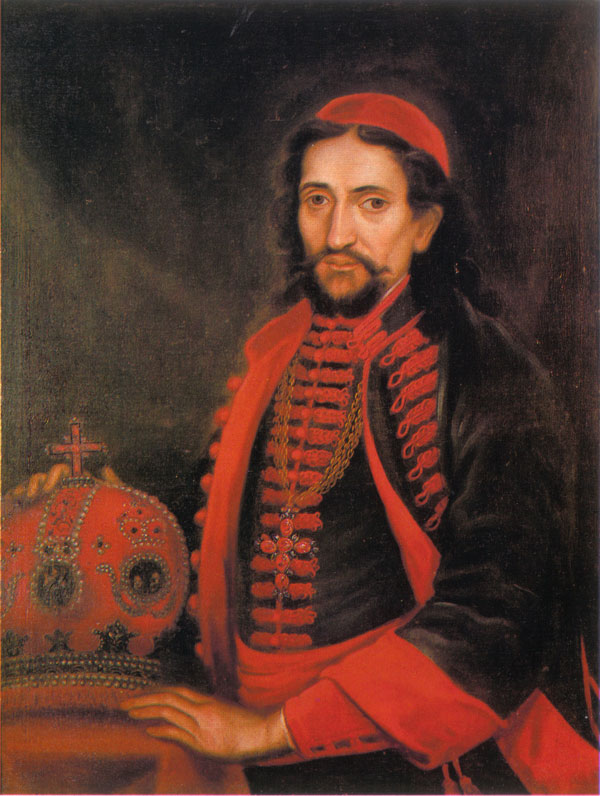
Metropolitan Vikentije Jovanović of Karlovci, former Bishop of Arad (1726–1731)

Between 1695 and 1865 the bishops were under the jurisdiction of the Metropolitanate of Karlovci (Patriarchate of Karlovci after 1848).

- Isaija Đaković (1695–1708)
- Joanikije Martinović (1710–21)
- Sofronije Ravaničanin (1722–26)
- Vikentije Jovanović (1726–31)
- Isaija Antonović (1731–48)
- Pavle Nenadović (1748–49)
- Sinesije Živanović (1749–68)
- Pahomije Knežević (1769–83)
- Petar Petrović (1784–86)
- Pavle Avakumović (1786–15)
- Sede vacans (1815–29), administrator Josif Putnik
- Nestor Jovanović (1829–30)
- Gerasim Rac (1835–52)
- Prokopije Ivačković (1853–65)

Since 1865, these bishops have been under the jurisdiction of the Metropolis of Sibiu until 1947 when the Metropolis of Banat was established. In 2009, the holder of the office was elevated to the rank of archbishop.

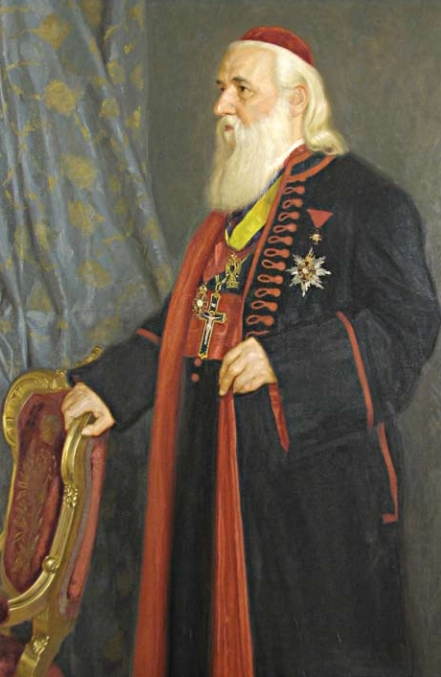
Metropolitan Ioan Mețianu of Sibiu, former Bishop of Arad (1874-1898); portrait by Arthur Coulin

- Prokopije Ivačković (1865–73)
- Miron Romanul (1873–74)
- Ioan Mețianu (1874–98)
- Iosif Ioan Goldiș (1899–1902)
- Ioan Ignatie Papp (1903–25)
- Grigorie Comșa (1925–35)
- Andrei Mageru (1936–60)
- Nicolae Corneanu (1960–62)
- Teoctist Arăpașu (1962–73)
- Visarion Aștileanu (1973–84)
- Timotei Seviciu (1984–present), archbishop since 2009.

== See also ==
- List of members of the Holy Synod of the Romanian Orthodox Church
- Declaratory Rescript of the Illyrian Nation
- Metropolitanate of Karlovci
- Patriarchate of Karlovci

== Sources ==
- Baán, István (1999). "The Metropolitanate of Tourkia: The Organization of the Byzantine Church in Hungary in the Middle Ages". Byzanz und Ostmitteleuropa 950-1453. Wiesbaden: Harrassowitz Verlag. pp. 45–53.
- Bocşan, Nicolae (2015). "Illyrian privileges and the Romanians from the Banat" (PDF). Banatica. 25: 243–258.
- Ćirković, Sima (2004). The Serbs. Malden: Blackwell Publishing. ISBN 9781405142915.
- Dávid, Géza (1994). "The Sancakbegis of Arad and Gyula". Acta Orientalia Academiae Scientiarum Hungaricae. 46 (1992–1993): 143–162.
- Gavrilović, Slavko (1993). "Serbs in Hungary, Slavonia and Croatia in struggles against the Turks (15th–18th centuries)". Serbs in European Civilization. Belgrade: Nova, Serbian Academy of Sciences and Arts, Institute for Balkan Studies. pp. 41–54.
- Sotirović, Vladislav B. (2011). "The Serbian Patriarchate of Peć in the Ottoman Empire: The First Phase (1557–94)" (PDF). Serbian Studies. 25 (2): 143–169. Archived from the original (PDF) on 10 August 2016.
- Stojkovski, Boris; Ivanić, Ivana; Spăriosu, Laura (2018). "Serbian-Romanian Relations in the Middle Ages until the Ottoman Conquest" (PDF). Transylvanian Review. 27 (2): 217–229. Archived from the original (PDF) on 2 June 2020.
- Točanac-Radović, Isidora (2018). "Belgrade - Seat of the Archbishopric and Metropolitanate (1718–1739)". Belgrade 1521-1867. Belgrade: The Institute of History. pp. 155–167.
