= Theresia Bastion =

- Bastionul Theresia
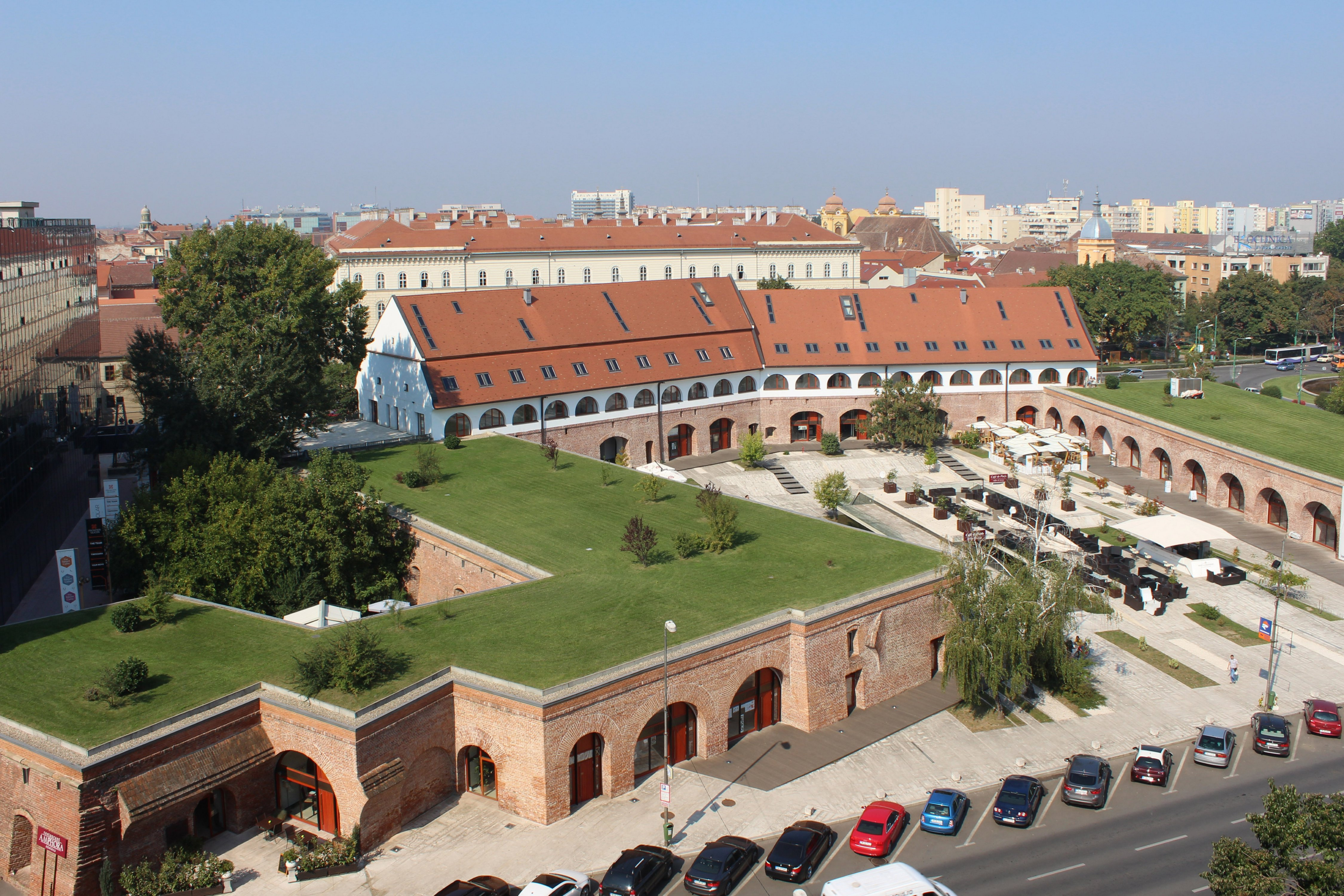
- Interactive map of the Theresia Bastion area
- Former names: Ravelin of the Food Warehouse

General information
- Type: Bastion
- Location: Timișoara, Romania
- Coordinates: 45°45′24″N 21°14′1″E
- Construction started: 1732
- Completed: 1734
- Renovated: 1969, 2010
- Owner: Timiș County Council (bodies A, B, C and E); Timișoara City Hall (body D)

Technical details
- Material: Brick

Renovating team
- Architects: Ștefan Iojică (1969); Marius Miclăuș (2010)
- Renovating firm: Archaeus
- Main contractor: Bennert GmbH/Prowa Contracting and Consulting GmbH

Theresia Bastion (Romanian: Bastionul Theresia), named after the Austrian Empress Maria Theresa, is the largest preserved piece of defensive wall of the Austrian-Hungarian fortress of Timișoara. It covers about 1.7 hectares of the city center. It was built between 1732 and 1734. Today it is used as a passage, but it also houses commercial spaces, restaurants, bars, a nightclub, a library and two permanent exhibitions of the National Museum of Banat, as well as the Ethnography department of the Banat Village Museum. The bastion is included on the list of historical monuments in Timiș County with LMI code TM-II-m-A-06103.03.

== History ==
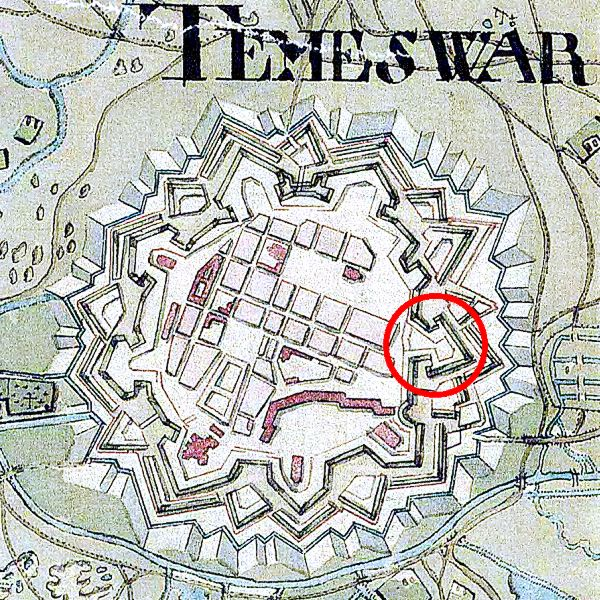
Position of Theresia Bastion within the Timișoara Fortress

After the conquest in October 1716 of the Timișoara Fortress by the Habsburg army under the command of Eugene of Savoy, it was found that the Turkish fortifications could not cope with the new fighting techniques. As a result, the decision was made to restore the entire fortress. The fortification was done in the Pagan system. The Pagan system inspired the first of the fortification systems envisaged by Vauban; the similarity between these systems spread the claim that Timișoara would have been fortified in the Vauban style.

The Timișoara Fortress (Romanian: Cetatea Timișoara; German: Festung Temeswar; Latin: Castrum Temesiensis) consisted of nine bastions: Charles, Francis, Theresia, Joseph, Hamilton, Castle, Mercy, Eugene and Elisabeth. The Theresia Bastion was the first to be built. Construction began in 1732 immediately after the hydrotechnical works to regularize Bega were completed, works that took place between 1728 and 1732 and which were intended to ensure the necessary water in the moat of the fortress so that the ravelin/bastion could function properly. It appears for the first time on the plans of 1732–1733. It was originally designed as a ravelin, surrounded by water, located in front of the curtain wall that was to unite the future Francis and Joseph bastions and was called the Ravelin of the Food Warehouse. Its construction was completed in 1733–1734. It was later incorporated into the fortification wall, and in 1744 it was renamed the Theresia Bastion, in honor of Archduchess Maria Theresa of Austria.

In the course of time, it was the residence of the Roman Catholic Diocese of Timișoara, then it housed several workshops and warehouses, an apprentice school, a riding school, an ethnography school, a fencing school, a printing house, boarding schools or the State Archives. After 1970, the ethnographic collections of the Museum of Banat, a technical museum and the old collections of the County Library were moved here.

At the end of the 19th century and the beginning of the 20th century, the city of Timișoara was defortified. Within it, almost all the fortifications were demolished. The Theresia Bastion was the only bastion that was not demolished, the reason being that it had usable rooms along its entire length.

Currently, the bastion belongs to the Timiș County (bodies A, B, C and E), administered by Timiș County Council, and to the municipality of Timișoara (body D), administered by Timișoara City Hall.

=== Restorations ===
The first restoration of the bastion was between 1968 and 1969, according to a project by the architect Ștefan Iojică. On this occasion, a passage through the bastion was made for car and pedestrian traffic, and reinforcements were made by pouring concrete. But a number of specific details were removed, and the ditch in front of the bastion was reduced.

A second restoration took place in 2008–2010 and was carried out in five construction phases. The restoration project was developed by Archaeus in 2004–2009 under the coordination of the architect Marius Miclăuș, and the contractor was the consortium Bennert GmbH/Prowa Contracting and Consulting GmbH. As part of this restoration, the cement-based mortars poured during the previous restoration were removed. The brick arches in the bastion's flanks and retreat were converted into porticos by inserting timber frames. The mounds of earth above the flanks and retreat, which formed breastworks and where firing barbettes were set up, were also removed. The inner courtyard of the fortification was completely redesigned, by arranging the body E, a stepped pedestrian area. The attic, which was not used in the last decades, was transformed into a cultural space with exhibition or conference halls. The 300-year-old beams have been preserved and enhanced, as have the ventilation shafts.

== Description ==
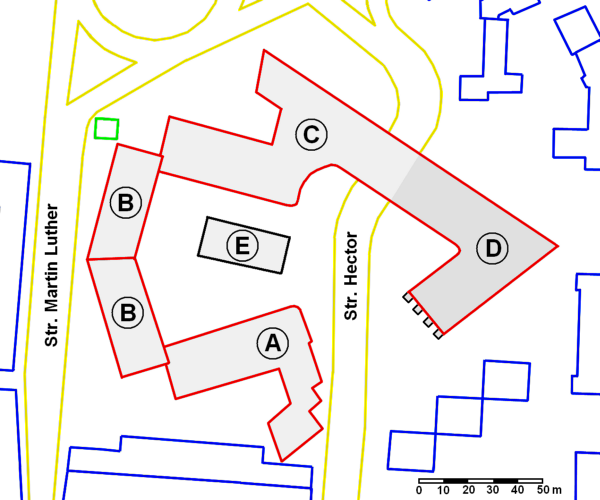
The plan of the preserved bastion, with the indication of the current bodies: red – outline of the bastion, yellow – street plot, green – kiosk with cannon, blue – current buildings

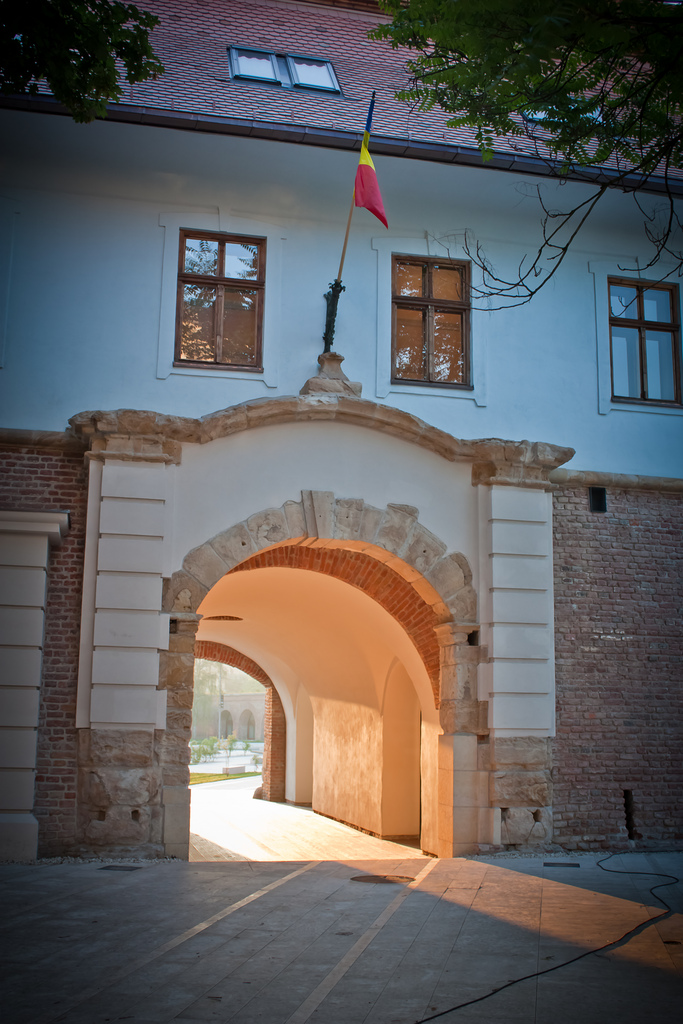
Entrance to the bastion

The bastion was located in the eastern part of the fortress. It is currently located almost in the center of the city, lying between the 1989 Revolution Boulevard, Martin Luther Street, Ion I.C. Brătianu Square and Vasile Goldiș Street. It is crossed in the north–south direction by Hector Street. It is part of the protected construction area ZCP 01 – Cetate historic district.

It corresponds to the type of fortifications with three fortified "rings", characteristic of the first half and middle of the 18th century. The fortifications prior to 1707, from the time of Vauban, did not have the third ring.

The bastion consists of two flanks, the northern and the southern, about 142 m (75 fathom) long, which form an acute angle of 72° to the east. The ends towards the fortress of the flanks form the ears of the bastion. The bastion is provided with a retreat, being the only bastion of the fortress equipped with such a thing. The flanks had embrasures to the outside, and the retreat had embrasures both outward and inward. The purpose of the retreat was to defend in case the bastion was penetrated. To the west, the bastion is closed by a one-story building, which was used as a storehouse for food (proviant) and a powder room. The bastion was designed in this way to be able to function independently, as a last point of resistance, similar to a keep in medieval fortifications.

In the current classification, body A consists of the southern ear of the bastion and the southern wall of the retreat, body B consists of the one-story building with attic that closes the bastion to the west, body C consists of the northern wall of the retreat and the northern flank of the bastion to Hector Street, body D consists of the northern and southern flanks of the bastion east of Hector Street, and body E consists of the basement arrangement in the center of the bastion.
