= Timișoara Fortress =

Historical fortress in western Romania

- Cetatea Timișoara
- Timișoara in Romania
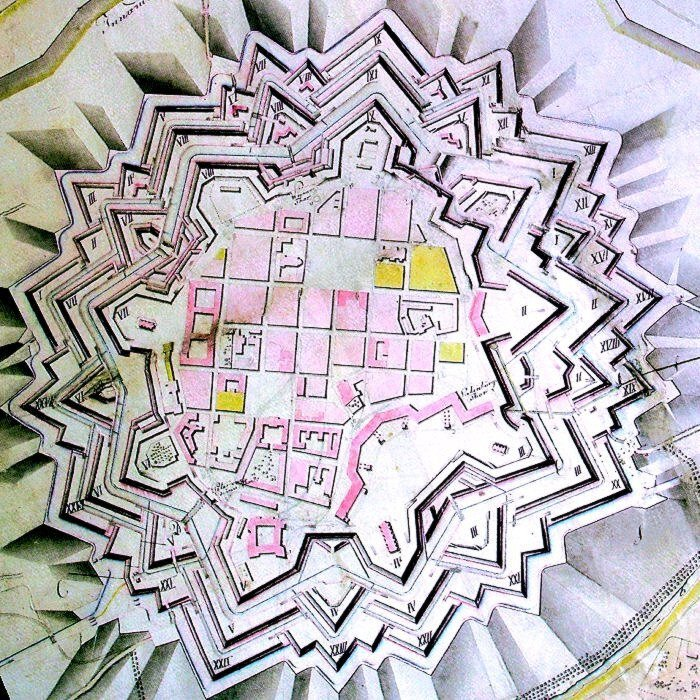
- Plan of the Habsburg fortress in 1808

Site information
- Type: Medieval fortification (1308–1732); Bastion fort (after 1732)

Location
- Location within Romania
- Coordinates: 45.756°N 21.228°E
- Area: 0.3 km^{2} (intra muros); 8 km^{2} (non-aedificandi)

Site history
- Built: 1308 (medieval); 1732 (bastion fort)
- In use: 1315 (medieval); 1765 (bastion fort)
- Materials: Clay, wood, stone, brick
- Fate: Demolished, 1892
- Battles/wars: Siege of Temesvár (1514); Siege of Temesvár (1551); Siege of Temesvár (1552); Siege of Temeşvar (1596); Siege of Temeşvar (1689); Siege of Temeşvar (1696); Siege of Temeşvar (1716); Siege of Temesvár (1849)

Garrison information
- Past commanders: István Losonci (1552); Juraj Rukavina Vidovgradski (1849)

Timișoara Fortress (Latin: Castrum Temesiensis, Castrum Temesvariensis, Hungarian: Temesvári vár, Turkish: Temeşvar Kalesi, German: Festung Temeswar, Romanian: Cetatea Timișoara) is a historical fortress in western Romania around which the town of Timișoara was built.

It is presumed that there was an earlier earthworks fortification built by the Avars, but the first written record is from the 13th century. At the beginning of the 14th century Charles I of Hungary built the first stone fortification, the Angevin fortress. In 1443 John Hunyadi restored the castle and the surrounding walls, which had been destroyed by an earthquake. The fortress was captured in 1552 by the Ottoman Turks, who held it till 1716 when it was taken by the Habsburgs. The Habsburgs reconstructed it, making it much bigger in the style of Blaise Francois Pagan, a precursor of the Vauban system. The Habsburg fortress was besieged only once, during the Hungarian Revolution in 1849.

The increased effectiveness of artillery with explosive shells at the end of the 19th century rendered the walls ineffective. As the walls and the area around them (the non ædificandi area) hindered the development of the town, the walls were demolished and the ditches were filled in.

At the beginning of the 21st century the only remains of the Habsburg fortress are the Huniade Castle, one bastion – the Theresia Bastion, an important tourist attraction – a casemate of the ravelin of the Vienna Gate, a portion of the Eugeniu bastion and a small part of the curtain wall between the Eugeniu and Elisabetha bastions. All these vestiges form the historic monument "Timișoara Fortress".

== Early fortresses ==
=== Roman Castrum ===
In the Roman period there was a castrum at Tibiscum, although the Castrum Temesiensis has been located in Jupa, not in modern Timișoara, and it is registered on the List of Historical Monuments. (Note: With LMI Code CS-I-s-A-10805.) It was claimed that there had been two villages named "Tibiscum", one located in Jupa, and the other in Timișoara in 1976, although this was disproved the following year. Even though it is known that the old centre of Timișoara was crossed northeast–southwest by a vallum – an earthen or turf rampart – and that the Austrian topographical engineer Heinrich Kematmüller made a controversial claim regarding the existence of a castrum, there is no certain documentary, archaeological or epigraphic evidence that one existed near the site of the Timișoara fortress.

=== Avar Fortress ===
In the 15th century the Italian architect Paolo Santini de Duccio claimed that he had built fortifications in Timișoara over old Avar earthworks. The idea that such a fortification existed was repeated by Nicolae Ilieșiu, who identified it with Zambara. It has since been proven that Zambara never existed, the name was a misspelling of Zanbara, which in turn is a misspelling of the name Zurobara. Zurobara is older than the Avar period – it was mentioned by Ptolemy in the 2nd century – and it has been located near Unip, 25 kilometres (16 mi) from Timișoara.

=== Angevin Fortress ===
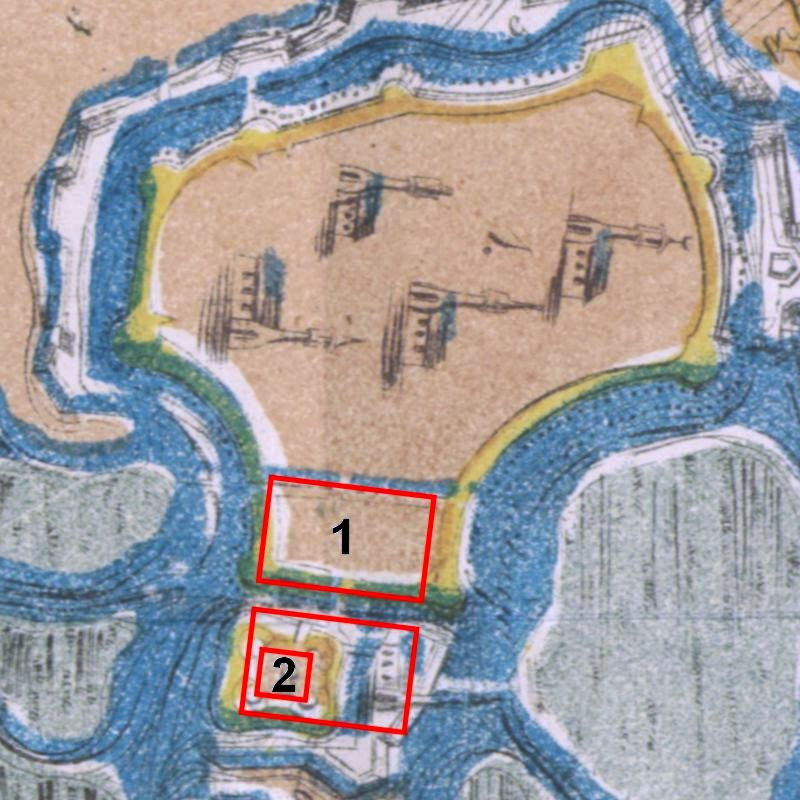
The location of Angevin fortress, from a plan of 1716 (turned by 90 degrees so as to have the north at the top side). 1 – the fort, 2 – the castle

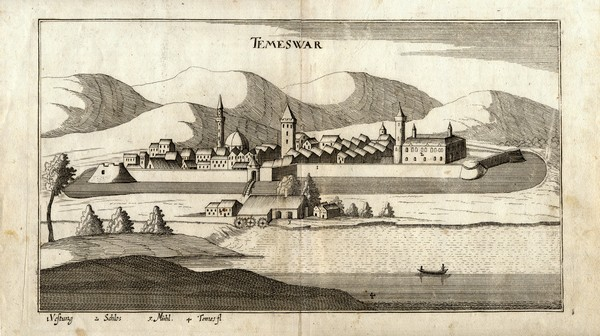
Engraving of 1685, stating that it represents the Ottoman city. In fact, the drawing is based on the (incorrect) assumption that under the Ottomans the Angevin fortress remained the same. The image depicts the area of the castle, seen from north. But the hills are fiction, being beyond the horizon.

The name Castrum Tymes (Thymes, Temes, Castrum Temesiensis, Castrum Temesvariensis) is found for the first time in documents in the 13th century. After his first visit to Timișoara, in the fall of 1307, Charles I of Hungary built the first stone fortress (Hungarian: Temesvári vár) between 1308 and 1315, on the site of an existing clay fortress, using Italian craftsmen. The reason for choosing this site was that the Mureș and Tisza rivers, the Danube and the mountain passes of western Romanian Carpathians prevented surprise attacks.

Paul Niedermaier and Mihai Opriș have speculated that the fortress was composed of two rectangular parts of about 170 × 110 m, having a total area of about 2 hectares.

The fort was situated within the perimeter of the current Alba Iulia – Dimitrie Cantemir – Carol Telbisz Streets and Huniade Square. Paul Niedermaier believes that the street network of the fortress was rectangular and that there were two main streets, one from north to south and the other from east to west. The north–south street was a commercial road which joined the two gates and it was situated between the current Alba Iulia and Lucian Blaga Streets. The east–west street was situated near the current János Bolyai Street. A castle was built in the southern part, in a similar perimeter, on the site of the previous Hunyadi castle. The castle was Charles I's royal court and residence between 1315 and 1323. During this period Timișoara was the capital city of the Kingdom of Hungary. The Water Tour (Water Tower) was built to defend the bridge between these two fortified areas. Later the tower became one of the symbols on the coat of arms of Timișoara. There was an inhabited rural area with irregular plots north of the fortress.

On 19 June 1404 Filippo Scolari became the Ispán (count) of Temes County. He found the Angevin fortress in poor condition and in need of major restoration. During his reign the areas exposed to attack were restored and strengthened with palisades. The castle was also restored and Scolari used it as his residence until his death in 1426. At the same time various public edifices in the city were erected or rebuilt, which led to the revival of the city's economic life.

=== Hunyadi Fortress ===
In 1441 John Hunyadi became the county executive of Timiș. On 5 June 1443 a powerful earthquake severely damaged the city walls, the castle and other buildings. Hunyadi restored the fortress by reusing stones from the walls and supplemented them with materials from the quarries in Vršac. Between 1443 and 1448 the walls were rebuilt higher and stronger, except the west side which remained as Scolari had built it because it was less exposed to attack due to the swamp stretching approximately 2–3 kilometers (1.2–1.9 mi). From the north to the current Eugeniu of Savoia Street, the fortifications were extended with an earthen wall reinforced with palisades and a moat. All of these defended the inhabited zone to the north of the Angevin fortress and this eventually became the core of the city. To the north of the town a large rural area, the Palanca Mare (verbatim the "Big Palisade", meaning "alongside the long palisade"), developed.

Hunyadi also restored the castle, keeping the wall on the west in its initial position, but extending the castle to the east by about 10 meters (33 ft). The castle had its own spring and reserves of water. An artillery battery was installed in the Water Tower. There was an inhabited, but weakly fortified, island to the south of the castle: The Island, Palanca Mică (verbatim "The Small Palisade", meaning "alongside the short palisade"). The island and the swamps to the east and the west protected the castle from cannon fire. To the north the castle was defended by the fortress. Thus, even if the castle was not inside the fortress, it acted as a keep. During the reign of Hunyadi the fortress had four gates: the Arad Gate, the Gate of Lipova (Praiko), the Ardeal Gate, and the Water Tower Gate.

Ladislaus the Posthumous borrowed 20,000 Florins (1 Florin contained about 3.4 grams of fine gold) from John Hunyadi for his military operations. In 1453, when Ladislaus was coming of age, John retired and Ladislaus gave him the Timișoara Fortress to cover his debt. The deed of gift, dated 20 August 1455, was recognised by the chapter of Cenad on 3 September 1455 and it reconfirmed him as a king on 7 April 1456. Initially the restoration work on the fortress was carried out at the expense of the royal treasury. Once it became the property of the Hunyadis they maintained it from their own funds. The castle was enlarged; a second floor was built and the old keep was built up to a height of 40 meters (130 ft). The guards, the knights' room, the prison and the stables were situated downstairs. The royal rooms, the guest rooms and a chapel were situated upstairs.

Huniade Castle was used as a headquarters by Pál Kinizsi, county executive of Timiș from 1478 to 1494. It came into his full possession in 1489 and, like his predecessors, he also strengthened the walls and the bastions.

On 15 June 1514 the fortress, defended by Stephen VII Báthory, was besieged by a peasant army led by György Dózsa. To capture the fortress Dósza attempted to reduce the swamps surrounding it by diverting the Timișel River into the Timiș River. He ordered the digging of a 7-kilometre-long (4.3 mi) channel from the area of the current Fabric Quarter to the vicinity of the modern Giroc, it was not completed before John Zápolya’s army arrived and defeated the peasants on 15 July.

After the Battle of Mohács in 1526, Timișoara was constantly threatened by the Ottoman Empire. In 1550, following the treaty with John Zápolya's widow, the Habsburgs took over the city of Timișoara and brought in Italian architects, such as Martino de Spazio, who reinforced the walls, fortified the Water Tower for harquebusiers and built bastions to strengthen the city against the threat posed by the Ottomans, despite the previous good relations between the Habsburgs and the Ottomans. The Ottomans, by supporting John Zápolya as voivode of Transylvania, considered Banat to be under their suzerainty.

== Ottoman Fortress ==
=== Ottoman siege of 1551 ===
Timișoara was strategically positioned to resist the expansion of the Ottoman Empire into the Habsburg Empire. The main route of the Ottoman attack was along the right bank of the Danube towards Belgrade, Buda and Vienna. In Serbia forts were established or reinforced in Golubac, Smederevo, Kovin, Belgrade, and Petrovaradin. As there was a bottleneck on the Danube at the Iron Gates, there were numerous fortresses in the Clisura Dunării: Turnu Severin, Ada Kaleh, Orșova, Dubova (Peci), Svinița and Drencova.

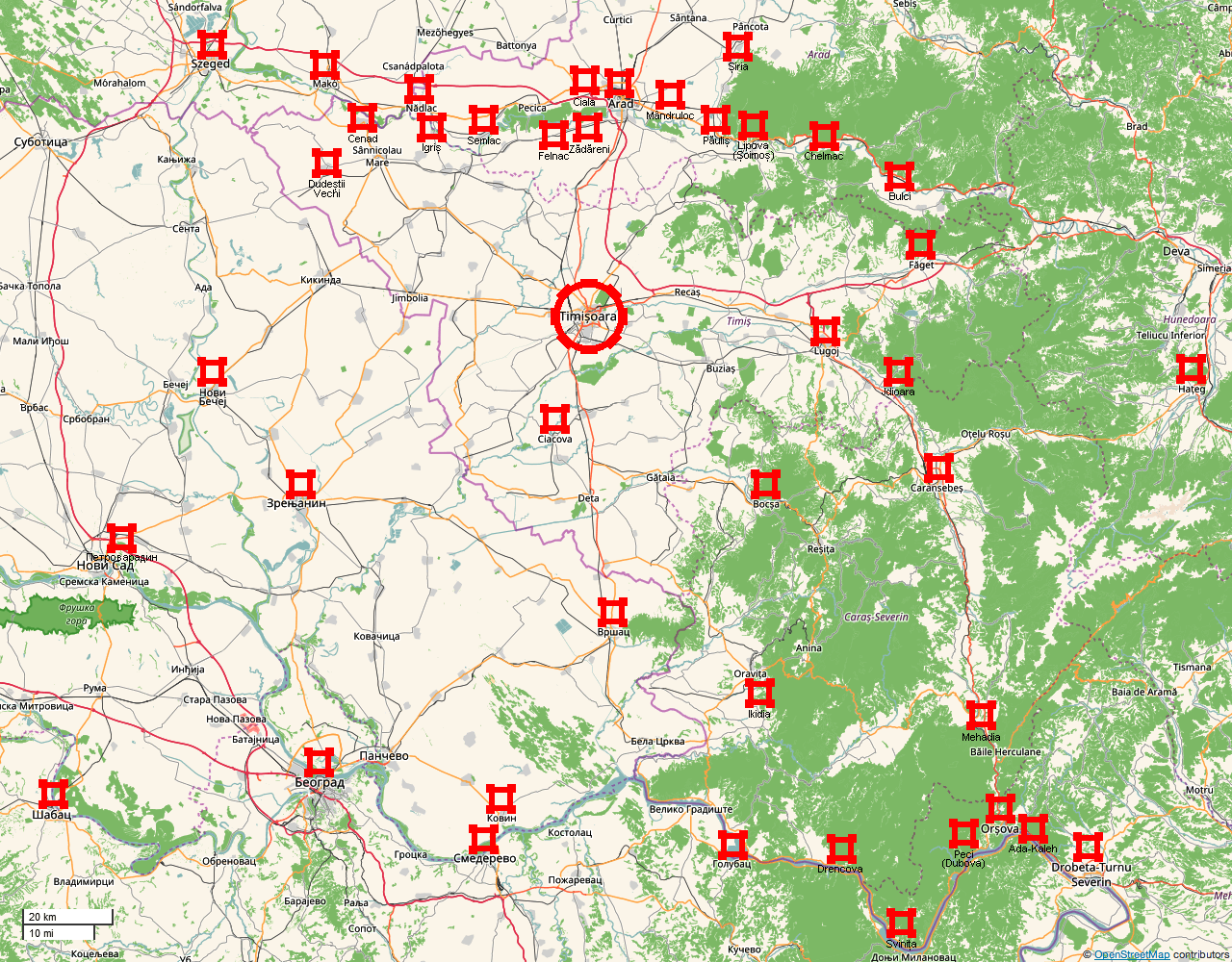
Fortresses in Banat in the middle of the 16th century – Timișoara Fortress shown circled

One of the routes used by the Ottomans for military intervention was along the Mureș, where almost all the riparian routes were fortified. The main fortresses were Szeged, Cenad, Arad and Lipova. Timișoara itself had to be protected. One of the routes to access it was through Timiș and Cerna. Here there were fortresses at Mehadia, Caransebeș, Jdioara and Lugoj. From Transylvania, Timișoara was defended by the fortresses of Făget and Hațeg. There were also fortresses in the territory of Ilidia, Vršac, Cuiești and Ciacova.

As Timișoara is situated almost in the middle of the Banat, it could support all these towns, which is why the Ottoman beys on the Danube stated that "whoever conquers Buda conquers a town, while whoever conquers Timișoara conquers a country". As a result, the Ottoman reaction to the takeover of Timișoara by the Habsburgs was not long in coming. In September 1551 Sokollu Mehmed Pasha, the beylerbey of Rumelia, began his campaign. He led an army of 8,000 janissaries, 100,000 akıncılar and 13 sanjak-beys with their troops. To hold Transylvania he relied on the rulers of Wallachia and Moldavia and on the Tartars. To isolate Timișoara, Sokollu Pasha started from Belgrade and advanced up the Tisza River by conquering Novi Bečej (19 September) and Zrenjanin (25 September). He continued along the River Mureș to Lipova, occupying the fortresses of Dudeștii Vechi, Pecica, Cenad, Igriș, Felnac, Zădăreni, Nădlac, Ciala, Arad, Mândruloc, Păuliș and Chelmac. Lipova was occupied without a fight on 5 October by Ulama Pasha, who remained there as sanjak-bey of the fortress.

Portrait of Ulama Pasha, who participated in battles in the Banat

From Lipova, the Ottoman army – reduced because it had to leave garrisons in the occupied towns – headed for Timișoara, where the vanguard of 600 cavalry arrived on 13 October and the rest of the army, 18,000 strong, the following day. The garrison of the fortress, led by István Losonci, consisted of 200 hussars from Ardeal, 600 Spanish, (Note: Under the command of Casparo Castelluvio of Sardinia, Bernard Aldana, Alphons Perez and Rodriguez de Villandrando) German and Italian mercenaries and Hungarians, Romanians and Serbs; altogether more than 2,000 cavalry and 1,500 infantry.

The siege of the fortress began on 18 October. The Ottomans began digging trenches in the area that would become Palanca Mare and placed two siege guns to bombard the fortifications from the north, but the intervention of the defender's cavalry prevented the attack. The defenders repulsed multiple attacks before the weather turned on 25 October and rain flooded the trenches. After 26 October the Janissaries' period of service ended, so Sokollu Pasha had to raise the siege and retreated towards Bečej.

The troops of the garrison went on the attack and on 29 October they reconquered Cenad Fortress. On 4 November the Imperial troops commanded by Giovanni Battista Castaldo arrived in Lipova and, after a two-week siege, the town surrendered. According to the tradition of the time, the surrender was conditional on the Ottomans being allowed free passage. However, András Báthori's troops did not respect the agreement and slaughtered the garrison. Ulama Pasha was injured, but managed to escape. This event had repercussions on the conquest of Timișoara the following year. By the end of November, all the fortresses occupied by the Ottomans during the 1551 campaign had been recovered.

=== Ottoman capture of the fortress ===
The Ottoman campaign began on 22 April 1552 when the Ottoman troops commanded by Kara Ahmed Pasha, the second vizier, left Adrianople and headed for Belgrade. They crossed the Danube together with the army of Rumelia commanded by Sokollu Pasha and reached Timișoara on 24 June with a vanguard of 1,500 horsemen. The siege began on 28 June. Sokollu Pasha was positioned on the east side of the fortress, and Hassan Pasha, the beylerbey of Anatolia, on the west side. The Ottomans had 16 basilisks (large siege cannons). The garrison of the fortress was about 2,500 men – including 1,000 Hungarians, 400 Spanish, 200 Austrians, 300 Czechs – and 17 cannon, Losonci István was still in command.

Turkish miniatures of the siege of 1552
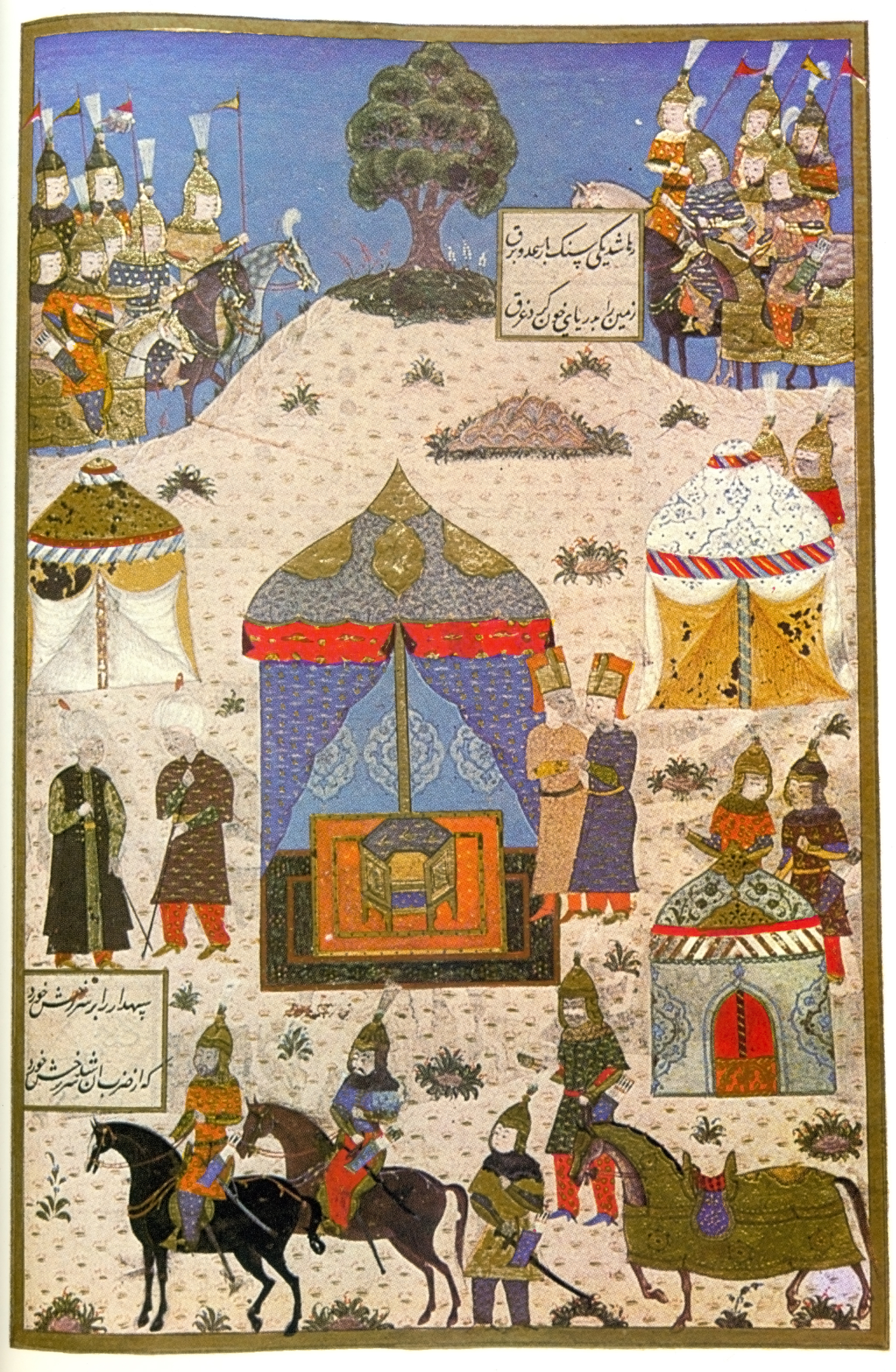
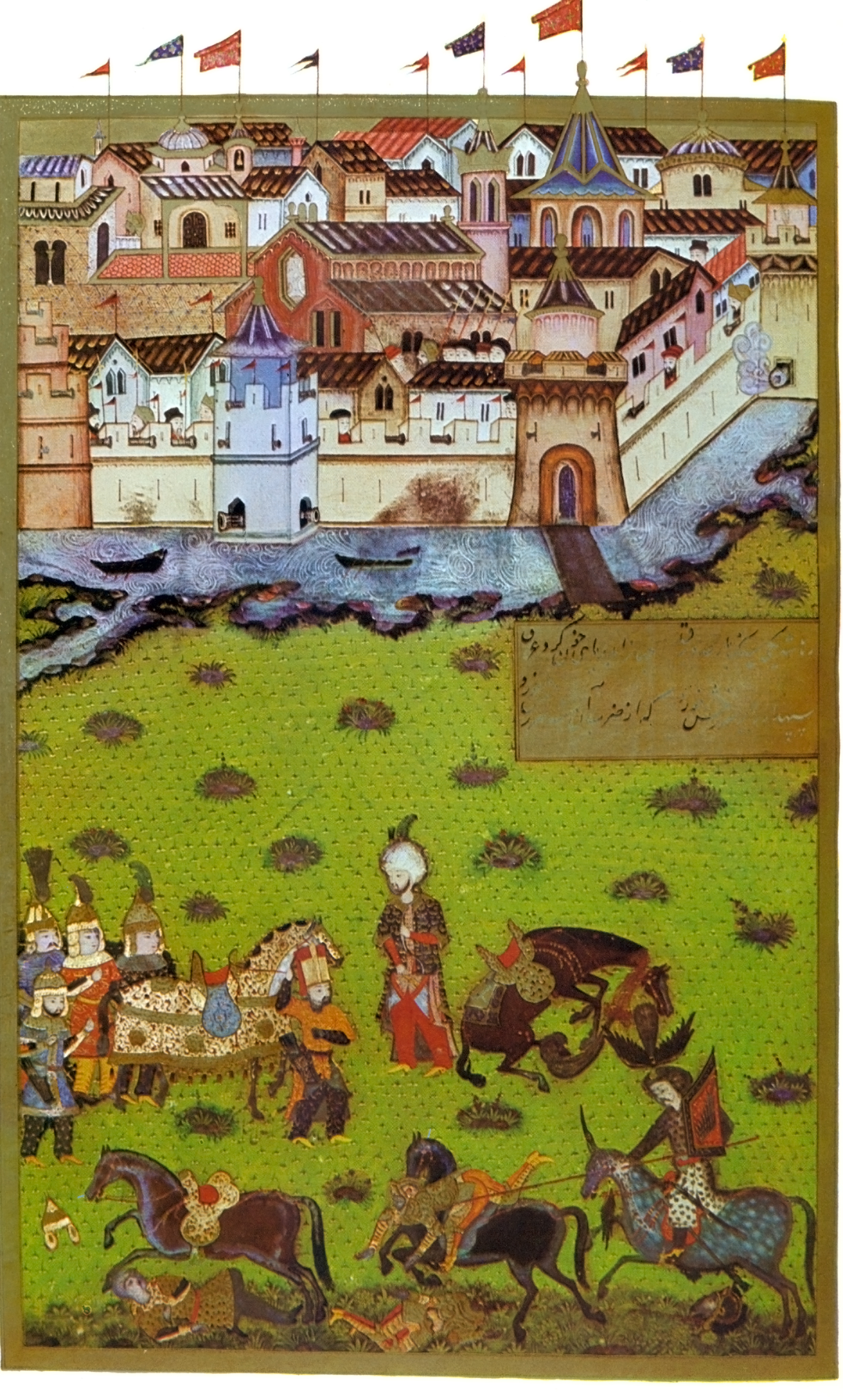
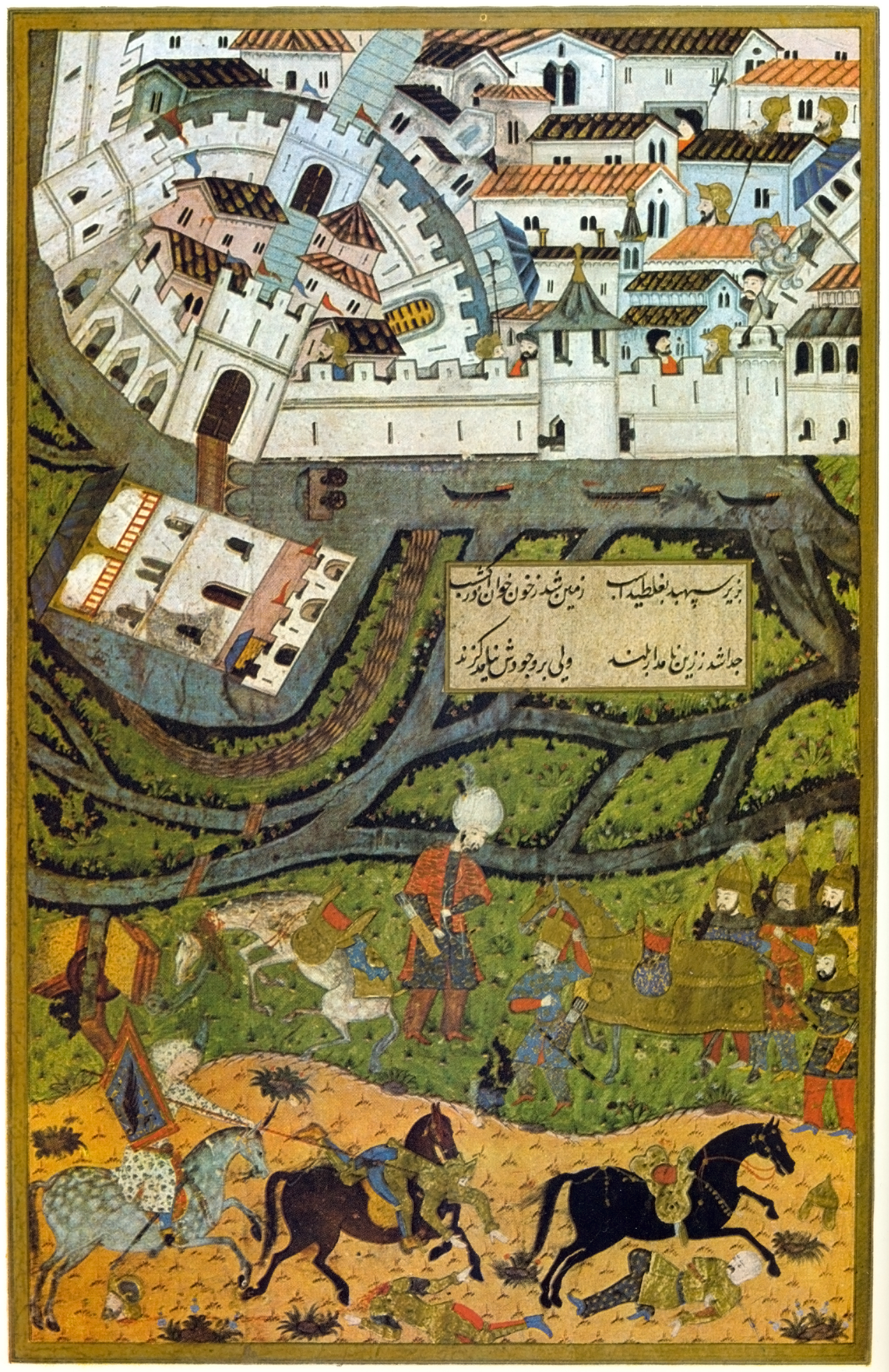
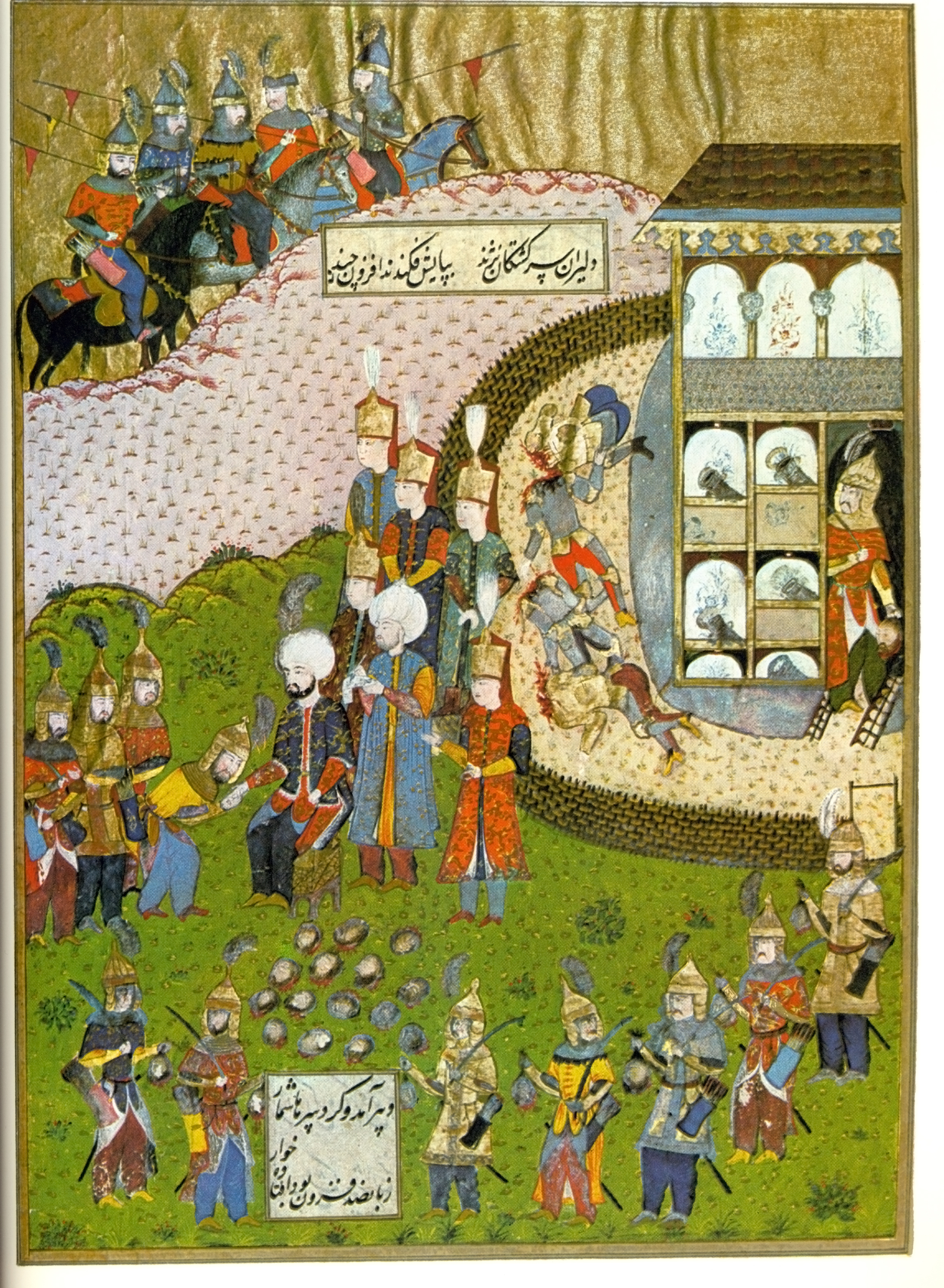

The siege lasted until 25 July. Turkish attacks took place on 29 June (on the island), 3 July (from the north), 6 July (on the island) and 12 July. On 6 July the Ottomans demanded surrender for the first time. The Turkish cannon constantly bombarded the fortress and eventually the defenders were no longer able to repair the damage. On 18 July there were discussions with the Ottomans regarding a surrender, but the defenders’ views were divided. The local inhabitants demanded the surrender of the fortress, but the soldiers, hoping for help from Castaldo – who did not arrive – wanted to continue the fight and used the two days truce to repair the fortifications as much as they could. Meanwhile, Ottoman artillery had increased and they deployed up to 30 cannon, organized in three batteries. On 20 July the Ottomans recommenced the bombardment, and the bastions and walls were destroyed over the following days. On 24 July the Water Tower was destroyed and captured by the Ottomans, but with heavy losses – over 2,000 fighters. With the loss of the Water Tower communications between the castle and the town were broken. On 25 July the last assault took place and the inhabitants demanded again that the fortress surrender. On 26 July the Spanish and Austrian mercenaries admitted that the town could no longer be defended and they capitulated.

On 27 July, in accordance with the surrender convention, the garrison left the town through the Praiko Gate. Nevertheless, as a reprisal for the massacre of the Lipova garrison the previous year, the Ottomans violated the armistice conditions and launched an attack that led to the murder of the defenders, including István Losonci.

=== 17th century ===
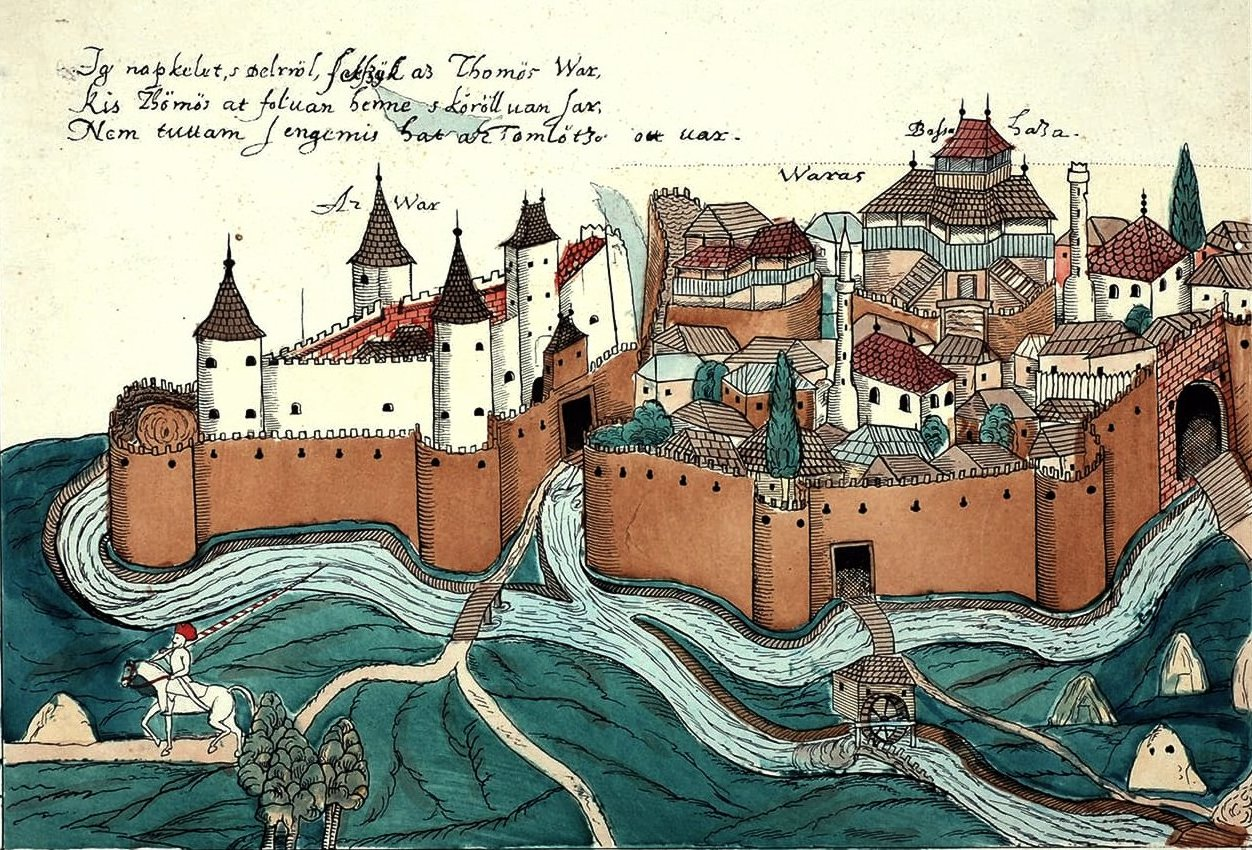
Timișoara Fortress in 1602

After the conquest of the fortress, most of the Banat became the Temeşvar Eyalet, ruled by Beylerbey Kasam Pasha. Timișoara has been considered to be the capital of Banat since the establishment of Temeşvar Eyalet. There is little information regarding the growth of the town. Published maps and vedute were based on information from before the Ottoman conquest. For example, Matthäus Seutter's 18th-century map showed the Island and Fabric areas as smaller than they were; nevertheless, the map was popular due to the author's fame and its use of colour. Another inaccurate vedute was published in 1656 by Nicolas Sanson or Gabriel Bodenehr; there were many others.

A sketch closer to reality was made in 1602 by Ferenc Wathay. This sketch was the basis of a veduta painted by Ludwig Förster in 1836. In the painting the city is seen from the northeast. We can see the castle and the wall with bastions surrounding it, the Water Tower, the irregular shape, and the city walls with their bastions and the Pasha's house.

In mid-December 1662 Leopold I sent a diplomatic mission to the Pasha of Belgrade. The mission was led by the Baron of Goëss, and Henrik Ottendorf was part of it. The real purpose of the visit was to observe the Ottoman military. While praising the purpose of the visit, the Ottomans diverted it to Timișoara, where at that time they were few Ottoman troops. The mission was left to wait and only in the summer of 1663 was it received in Belgrade. Although in Timișoara they were always accompanied by Ottoman officials, Ottendorf took advantage of the delay, making notes of what he saw. However, they were not allowed access everywhere, for example, not in the fortified area of the south – the old Angevin fortress and the castle. The 1663 notes were systematized in a 1667 document of 97 pages with 24 drawings, of which two (a veduta and a plan) are of Timișoara. The plan is considered approximate, but the veduta is considered much more accurate than anything else from the time, and is the only view of the fortress (Turkish: Temeşvar Kalesi) in the second half of the 18th century made by an eyewitness.

During the Turkish occupation, Timișoara was divided into three parts: the fortress, the town and the suburbs. The fortress was the area where the castle and the headquarters of the vali (governor) and the kaymakam were located. The town was the fortified area on the north side of the fortress. In the middle of the town there was the bazaar, the centre of commerce. The suburbs (Palanca Mare) were, in turn, divided into the Rascian Town (Rascians was the name given by the Habsburgs to the orthodox Serbs) and the Island (other than the one that protected the castle from the south) to the east, in front of the Water Gate. In front of the castle, towards the city, there was the Water Tower. The castle was surrounded by another four defensive towers, linked by walls. Only the Ottomans inhabited the town. The Catholics and the Serbs lived in the suburbs where they had their own churches.

Ottendorf veduta of the Ottoman city of Timișoara and the map of Perrette

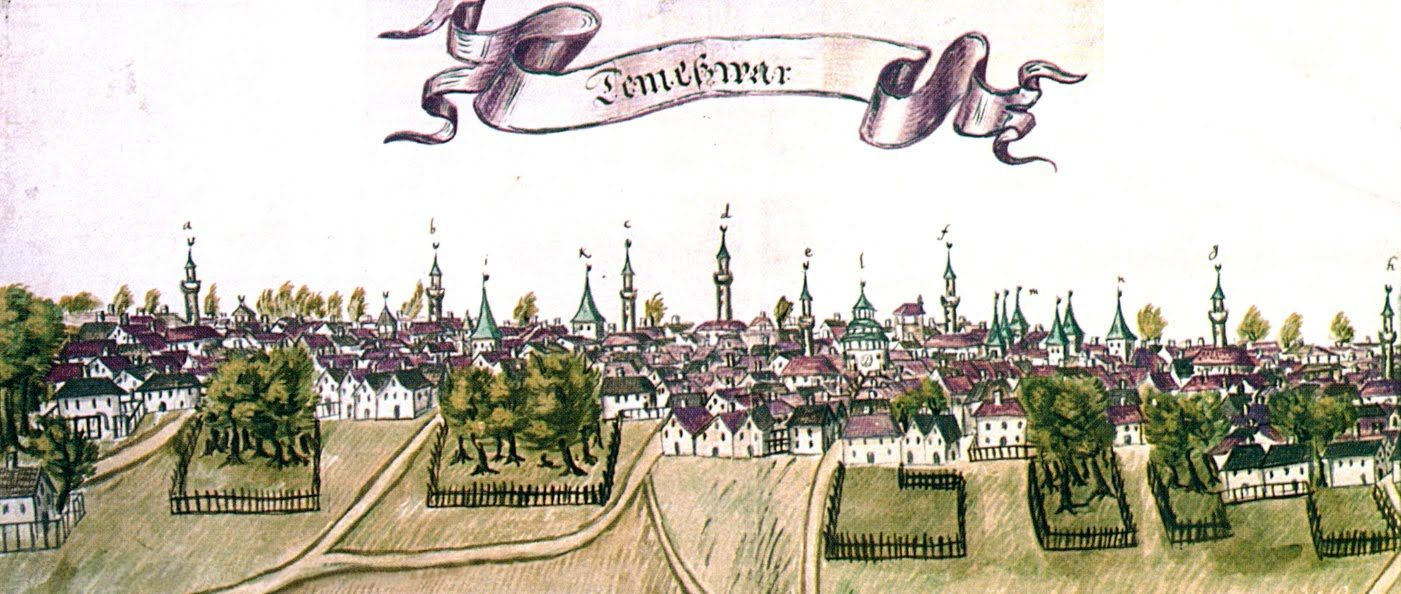
Ottendorf's veduta, a view from the north side of the fortress.
Here: a–h indicate 8 minarets of mosques; i — the tower of Azaps gate (P); k — the Water Gate tower (Q); l — the Rooster Gate tower (O); m — four of them are the towers of the castle, and one is the Water Tower; n — the tower of the Blood Gate (S).

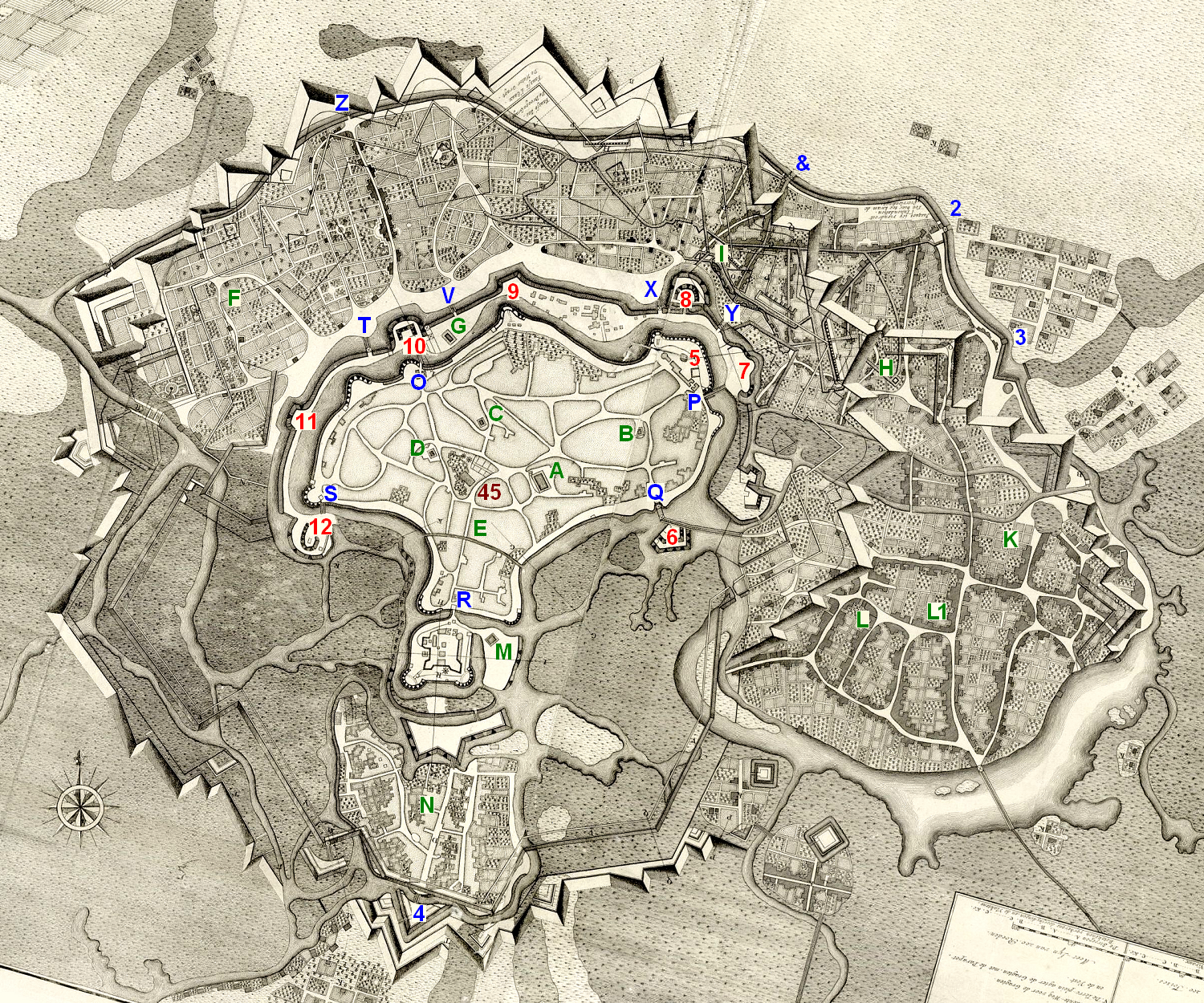
The plan of Ottoman Fortress Temişvar, on Perrette's map (see below). The notations are those used by Opriș.
Red numbers are bastions, blue markers are gates and green letters are mosques.

The town was cordoned off by tall earthen walls reinforced by palisades made of tree trunks tied with wickerwork. The walls on the west, north, and east were protected by a counterguard with a palisade. The wall to the south was protected by the castle, and the walls on the southeast and southwest were protected by swamps. There were deep moats in front of the counterguard, in front of the walls and between them.

The walls of the town had five gates:

- Horos Kapî (Turkish: Horoz Kapısı) = The Rooster's Gate, to northwest (marked with an O on Perrette's map),
- Azab Kapî (Turkish: Âzeb Kapısı) = The Gate of Azaps to the east (P)
- Soukapî (Turkish: Su Kapısı) = The Gate of the Water, to the southeast (Q)
- Kuciuk Kalle Kapî (Turkish: Küçük Kale Kapısı) = The Little Gate of the Fortress to the south (R) and
- Kana Kapî (Turkish: Kana Kapısı) = The Blood Gate to the west (S).

The Counterguard had four gates: the Rooster's Gate (Z), the Sedi Pasha Gate (V), the Osman Aga Gate (X), and Aghas' Pasha Gate (Y). Palanca Mare could be entered in through the Gate of the Long Toggle Bridge (in the northwest, in front of the Rooster's Gate), the Forforos Gate (&), the Martoloz Gate (2) and the Customs Gate (in the northeast, 3). Palanca Mică could be entered through the Gate of Belgrade (4).

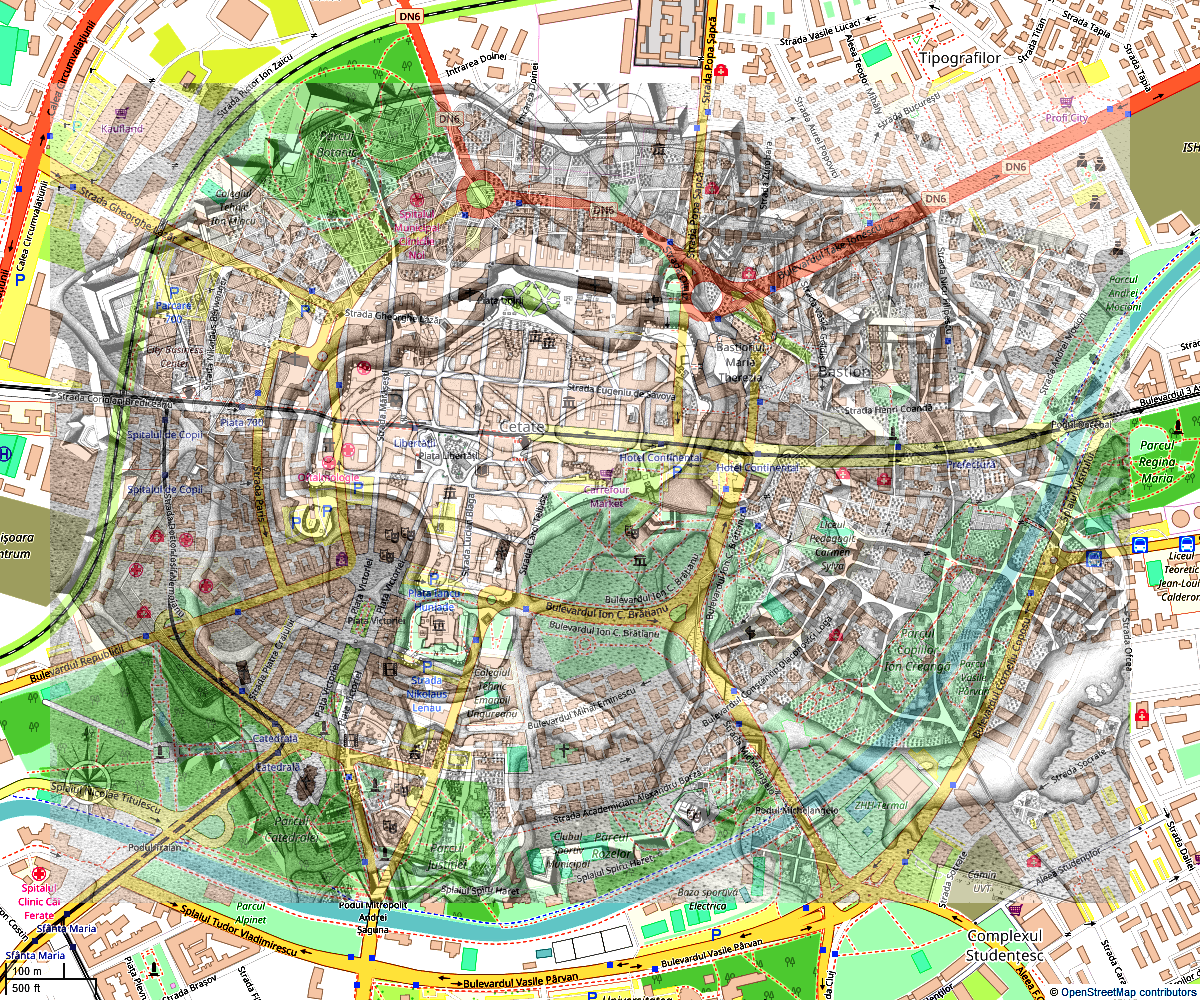
The Ottoman city superimposed on a map of modern Timișoara

The walls and the counterguard had bastions – the bastion of Arsenal of the Artillery was located in the north-east (5). The Water Gate was defended by the Water Gate Bastion (6). The bastion of Arsenal was flanked by the bastion of Gate of the Azaps (7) and Ali Pasha Bastion (8). Azig Pasha (9) and the Rooster's bastions were located on the north side (10). The Yamak Bastion (11) and the Blood Tower (12) were located on the west side. There were two bastions on either side of the Castle's Small Gate and two other bastions in the southern corners of the walls that protected the castle.

The fortifications were restored in 1571. The garrison was initially composed of about 250 soldiers, of whom 100 were horsemen. As well there were about 150 azaps – peasant militia. There were about 20 Martologs (Christian sailors on the Danube who were border guards) and some müteferiki (various specialists). In the case of military confrontations, other troops would be despatched to the fortress. Over the years the garrison grew and in 1624 it numbered about 1.000.

In September 1595, Timișoara was besieged by Sigismund Báthory’s troops, but they withdrew after the arrival of an Ottoman relief force. The following year, in June, the siege reoccurred, but it was again unsuccessful. In 1597 the Habsburgs offered an annual tribute of 12,000 ducats (about 40 kg of fine gold) for the restitution of Timişoara, but the Ottomans refused. The siege resumed in October–November, but it was again unsuccessful. In February 1600, the troops of Michael the Brave, under the command of Baba Novac, attacked Timișoara and burned down the suburbs, but they did not besiege it and moved to Pančevo. In October 1603, it was Giorgio Basta's turn to besiege Timișoara, but again it held out.

Evliya Çelebi visited Timișoara many times between 1660 and 1664 and also recorded a description of what he saw. The counterguard and the fortifications with palisades were made in the second half of the 17th century. Therefore, it is considered that the names Palanca Mare and Palanca Mică date from this period. In 1686, Timișoara Fortress was prepared for battle. According to an inventory of the weaponry, this included 54 pieces of artillery – of which 3 were basilisks – 1346 rifles, 402 bows and 11,760 arrows and 5,156 grenades. In the first half of 1688 the fortifications were repaired. Between the fall of 1689 and the spring of 1690, Timișoara Fortress was subjected to a long siege by the Imperials. During 1692 and 1693 the fortifications were repaired and the fortress was supplied with weapons. In the fall of 1695 Sultan Mustafa II visited Timișoara and organized an expedition to capture Lipova Fortress. The weapons from the captured fortress, including 6 basilisks, were brought to Timişoara. In 1696 the Imperials, under the command of the Electorate of Saxony Frederic August, besieged Timișoara again. However, they were defeated by the Turkish Army, after which the fortifications were again restored. Although they kept repairing the fortifications, they were of earth with wood-plated parapets, unable to withstand modern artillery. Of the buildings only the castle, the mosques and the walls surrounding the castle and the fortress (the southern part of the city, the Angevin fortress) were made of masonry, the rest of the buildings were made of wood and thatch and so burnt easily.

== Habsburg Fortress ==
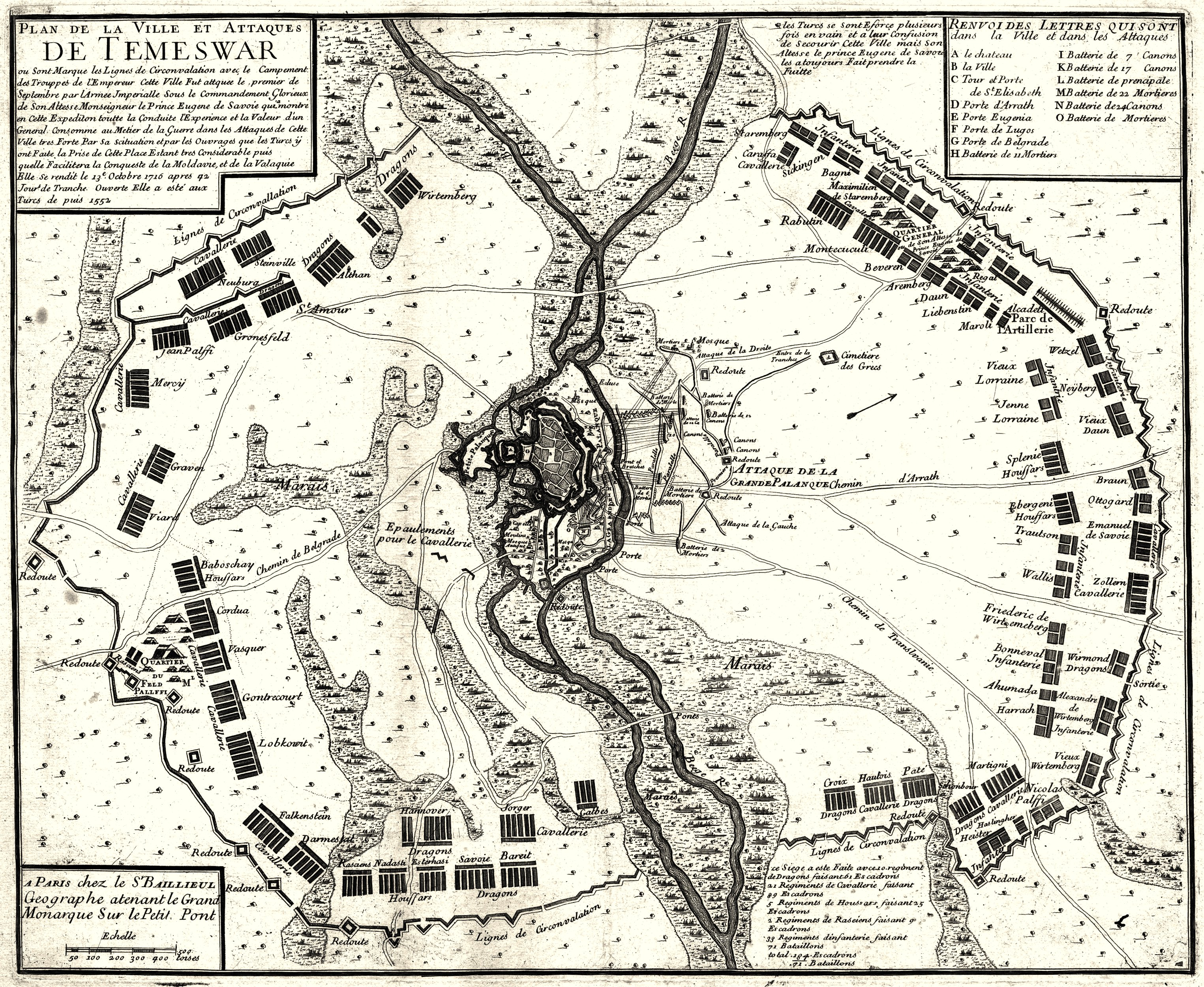
Plan of the Habsburg siege of Timișoara. North is indicated by the arrow. The plan depicts the deployment of units, the military engineering works carried out: trenches, artillery batteries and their fire, the circumvallation, redoubts, etc.

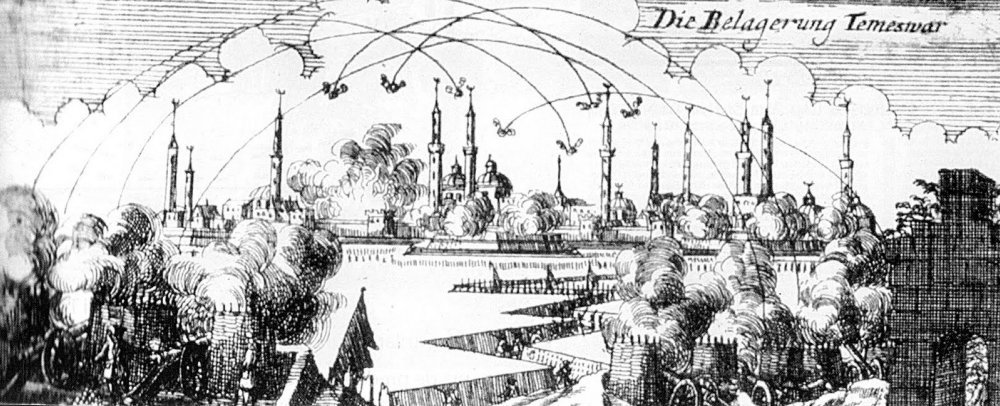
The Siege of Timișoara by the Habsburgs (1716)

=== Capture by the Habsburgs ===
During the Austro-Turkish War of 1716–1718, Prince Eugene of Savoy defeated the Ottoman army at Petrovaradin on 5 August 1716. He then headed for Timișoara with his army of about 45,000 infantry, over 23,000 cavalry, 50 field guns and 87 siege cannon. The Ottoman garrison was composed of about 16,000 men and 150 cannons.

On 21 August fourteen Austrian squadrons commanded by General Rotenhan reached Timișoara. The rest of the Austrian army and Prince Eugene arrived on five days later. The siege started on 31 August. Engineering works were carried out between 1 and 5 September: trenches were dug and cannon were emplaced in order to cover the operations. From 16 September the bombardment increased in intensity as more guns arrived and were installed. The first breaches in the walls appeared between 20 and 22 September. Meanwhile, another army corps, consisting of 14 squadrons and 4 infantry battalions under the command of General Steinville, arrived from Alba Iulia. The Ottomans’ counter-attacks were repelled. There was an intense mutual bombardment on 25 September. Ottoman troops attempting to relieve the fortress garrison attacked from the south three times on 26 September. They failed to break through as they had not synchronized their attack with the defenders of the fortress. The counterguard was captured on 30 September. The guns were moved to new positions during early October. On 11 October a massive bombardment of the walls began. A white flag of surrender appeared on 12 October on one of the bastions at half past eleven.

According to the terms of surrender, the Ottomans and the kurucs were allowed to leave the city with their personal possessions. Approximately 1,000 wagons were available for their withdrawal. They were permitted rations for a 10-day trip to Belgrade. Deserters from the Habsburg army were not allowed to leave, and the heavy weapons, the gunpowder and the fodder supplies had to remain.

After the Austrians’ conquest of Belgrade in 1718, the Austro-Turkish war ended. The Treaty of Passarowitz confirmed the transfer of the Banat of Temeswar, including Timișoara Fortress, to the Habsburg monarchy.

=== Reconstruction ===
After its capture the fortress was in badly damaged state and the Austrians began to repair and rebuild it. There was not a clear plan and coherence was hampered by the need for it to always remain functional. Many schemes were suggested between 1717 and 1727, but none were executed. Just after the conquest the military engineer Captain François Perrette, who had laid out the fortifications in Slavonski Brod in 1715, was tasked with making a topographic map of the fortress along with proposals for new fortifications. He made three plans, the first two in October 1716 and February 1717, which were considered very accurate, and the third, published in 1729, contained plans for the proposed fortifications. The first fortification, built in 1716, was the "New Ravelin", meant to defend Palanca Mică from the south.

A first proposal was to build bastions along the old wall from the north. The Palanca Mică was to be preserved and barracks were to be built at its eastern end. The problem was the small space inside the walls. However, the project provided configuration of the Casemated Barracks, later known as the Transylvanian Barracks, which would close the fortress perimeter from the southeast. The Palanca Mică area was proposed as a residential area.

Another proposal was to build a residential area to the southeast of the barracks. It was less exposed to a potential siege due to its location in the swamp. However, the proposed bastions were designed in Italian style, already obsolete, and the form of the fortification was unsuitable for the principles of an ideal city. The project indicated that it had already been decided that the fortress would have three layers of fortification.

Geyer's proposal was to keep the fortress together with the castle, keeping an extension area to the southeast. There were proposals for the extension of this area even after the construction of the first wall was complete, as can be seen in plan no. 3 from 1734. Plan no. 3 is the first official plan that included the entire outline of the fortifications. In it the elements depicted in red were buildings that had already been raised (the Casemated Barracks and the fodder supply warehouse of the Theresia Bastions). The ones sketched in black had their foundations laid, and the ones in yellow represented the proposals to close the curtain wall.

Unfulfilled fortification projects

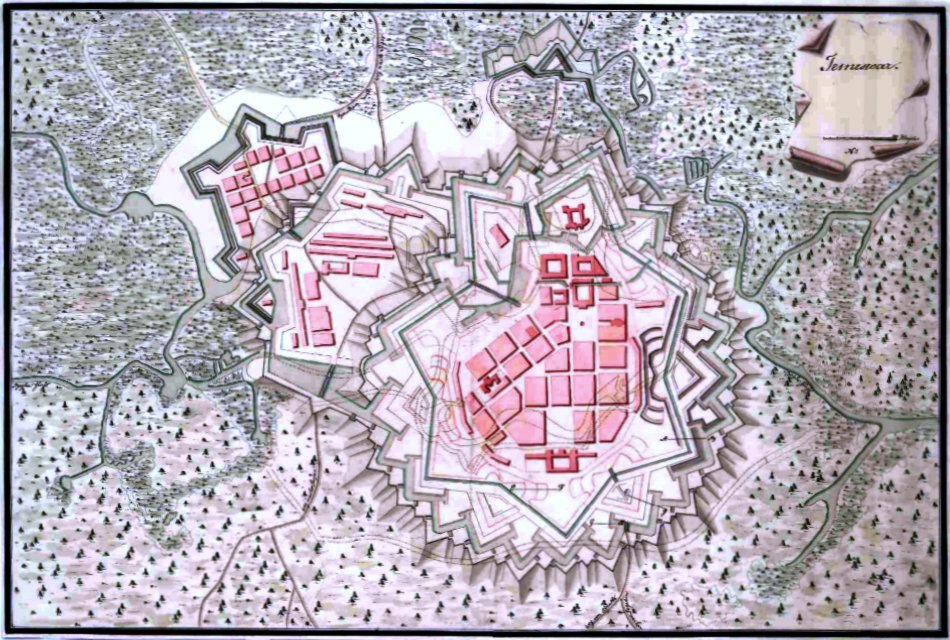
Proposal with residential area to the southeast. North is down.

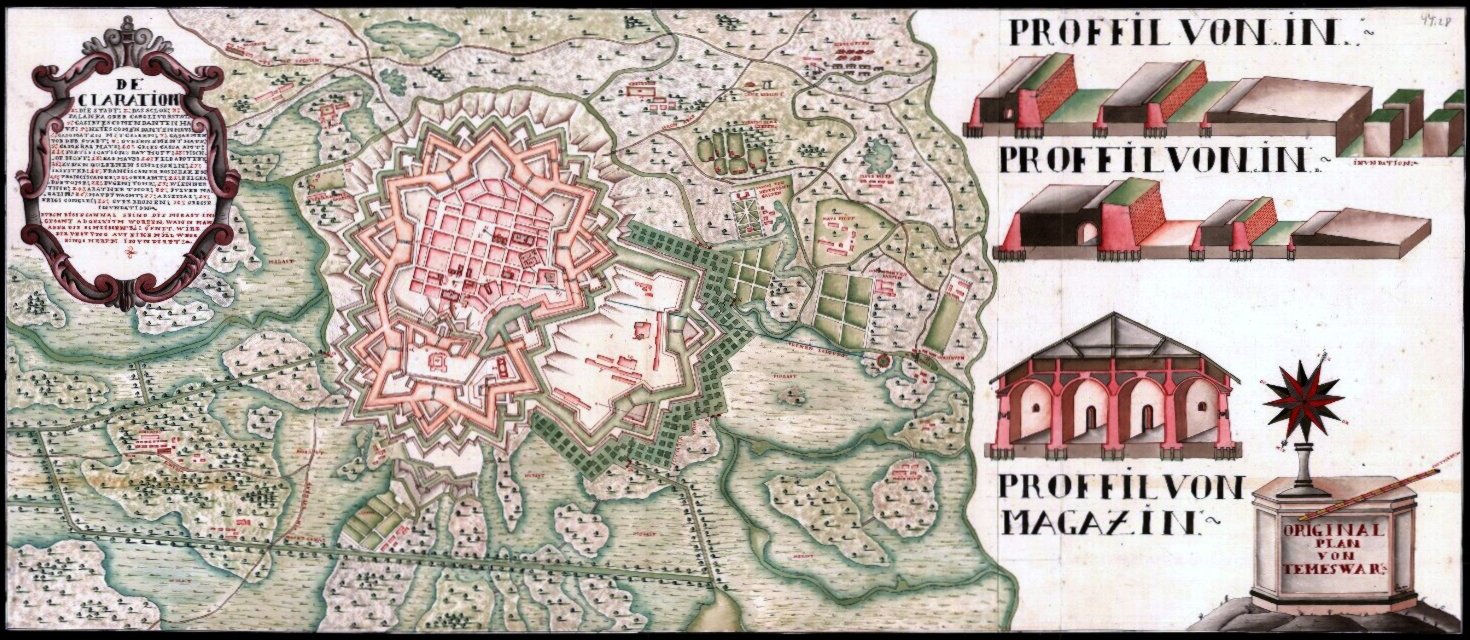
Geyer's proposal.

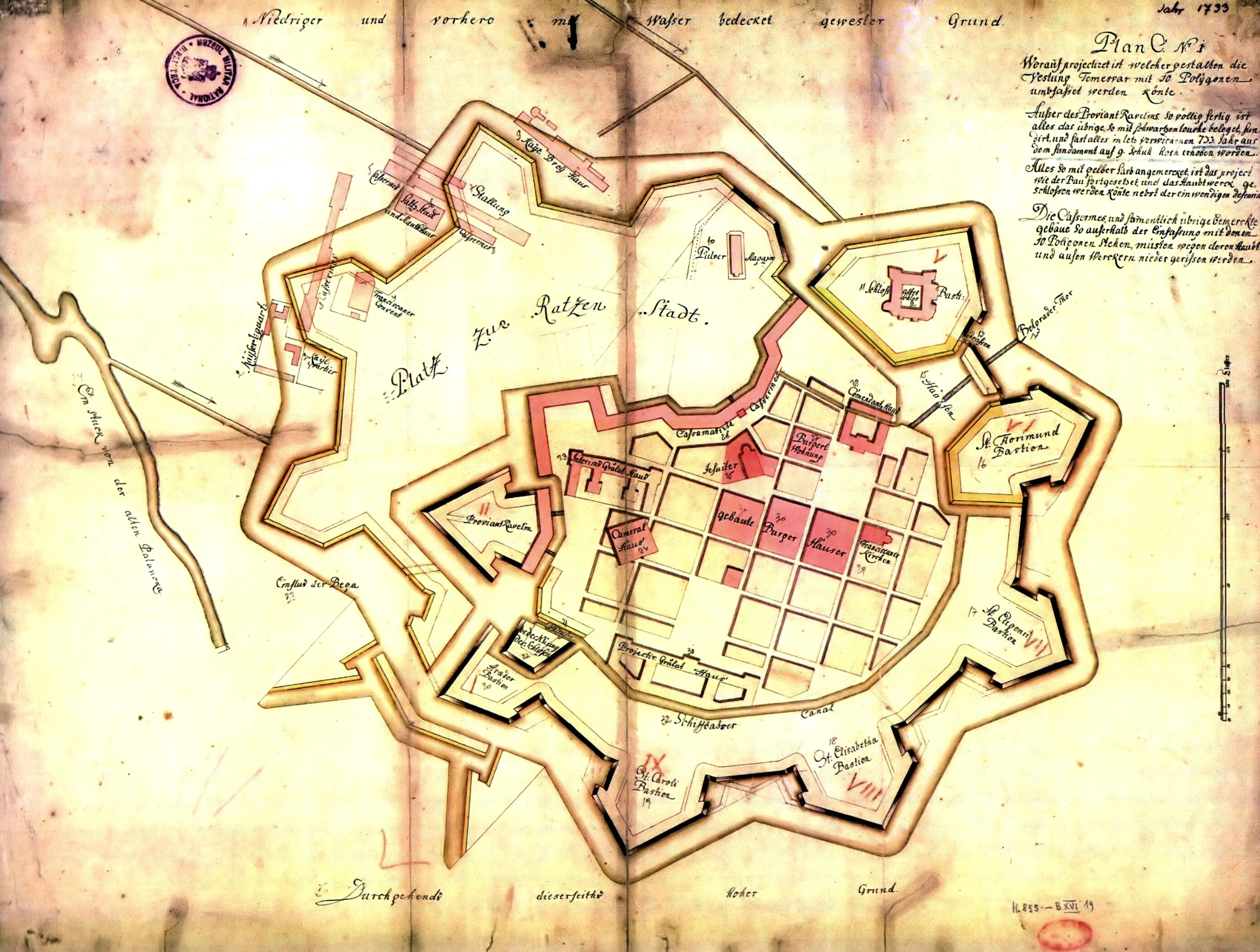
Plan for enlargement no. 3. North is down.

The foundation stone of the future fortress (German: Festung Temeswar) was laid on 25 April 1723. A zinc plaque inscribed was with "Imperante Carolo VI, Duce Eugenio Sabaudiae Principe per cladem Petro-Varadini MDCCXVI a Turcis recuperata Provincia, sub preadisio Claudii Comitis a Mercy anno a patru Virginis MDCCXXIII die XXV. mensis Aprilis Temesvarini moenia fundabantur", but the plans indicate that the main work began later. The first work was on the Infantry Casemated Barracks, built between 1727 and 1729. At that time the plan for the fortress had not been finalised.

In 1732 a significant part of the fortress was designed and the digging of the moat from the front of the future bastions began. It took one year to excavate the trench and erect the curtain wall and the counterscarp. The construction was delayed due to the prior execution of hydrotechnical works to provide the water needed for the Fortress, executed between 1728 and 1732.

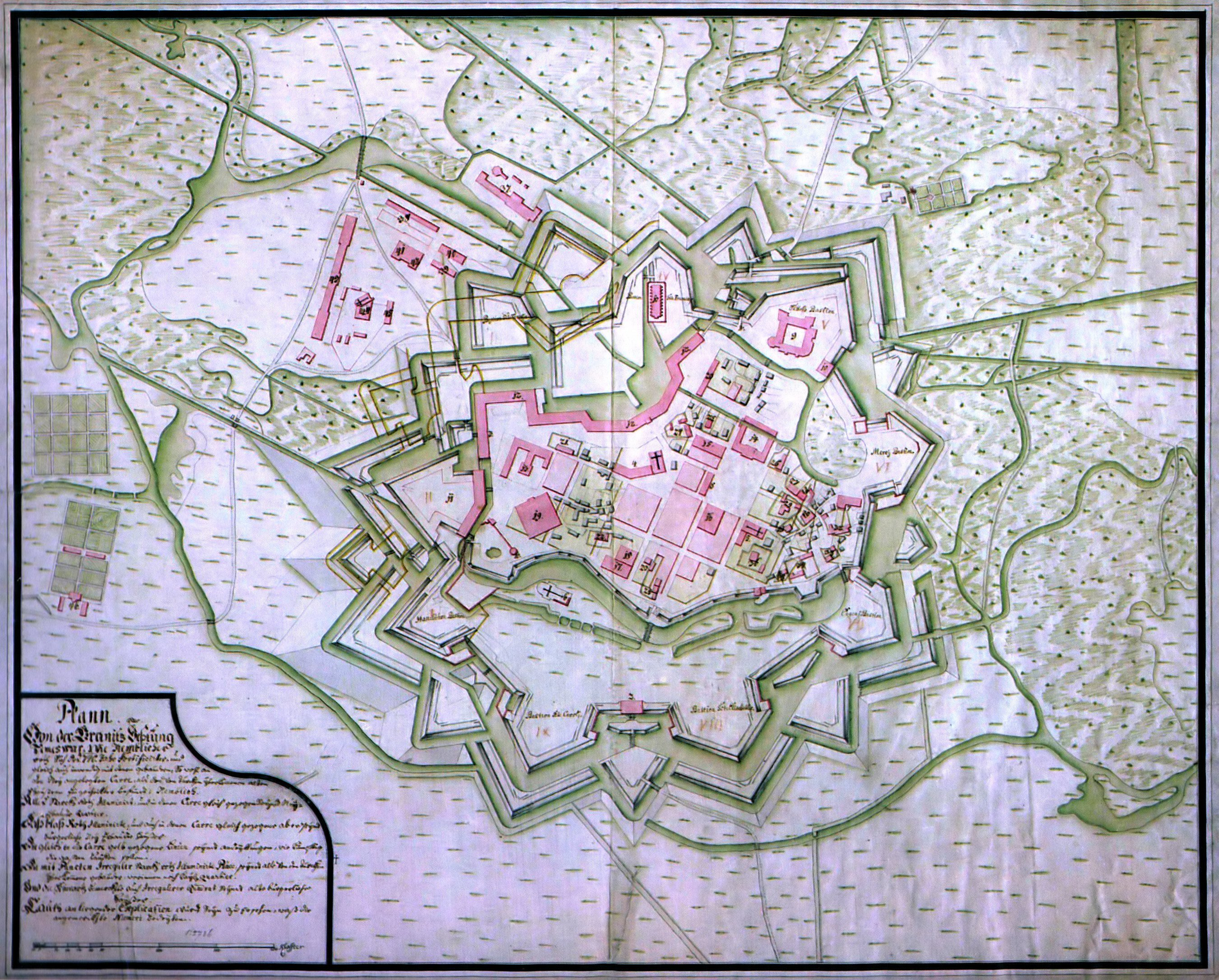
Fortress plan in 1740. North is down.

The first defensive wall belts of the fortress were finished in 1740. The first wall had 8 bastions (there were 9 eventually) in Pagan style (precursor of the Vauban style fortifications) and the curtain walls between them. The second one had eight ravelins placed in front of the inner works of the fortress (the curtain walls and bastions). This gave a clear picture of how the town would look and how long it would be a non-aedificandi area. In 1744, the sites of the German and Rascian suburbs were approved (the current Iosefin and Mehala quarters).

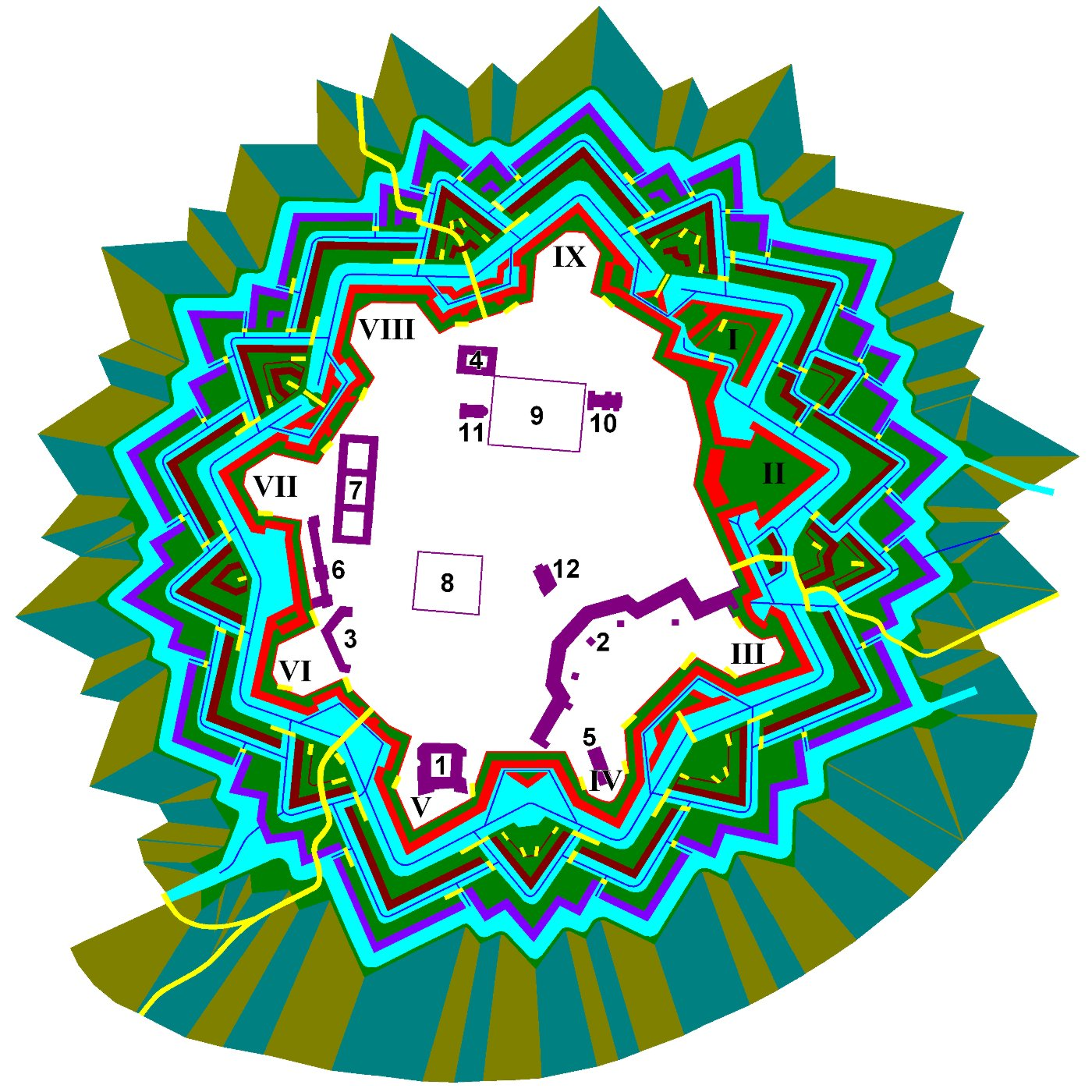
The Fortress' fortifications in 1808

The plan of the fortress in 1808 (see the infobox) shows its final shape, as the three wall belts had already been finished in 1764. The adjacent picture is drawn based on this plan and highlights the details. The various shades of green represent the banquettes, the barbettes, the covertways and the glacis. Blue indicates the trenches, and light blue represents the floodplains in case of siege. Yellow represents the access ways, the bridges and the ramps. In the intra muros area there were fortified buildings represented in dark red: Hunyadi Castle (1), the Infantry Casemated Barracks (later known as the Transylvanian Barracks), The Barracks of the Fortifications Construction Service (The Engineer's House) (3), Vienna Barracks (later Franz Joseph Barracks) (4), the gunpowder magazine (5), the dermatology hospital (6) and the military hospital (7). There were three squares: The Parade Square (8), The Main Square (9) – next to the dome (10) and the Rascian Church (11) – and a small triangular square (the current St. George Square) where there was a church, the former Great Mosque (12). The ground level is shown in white.

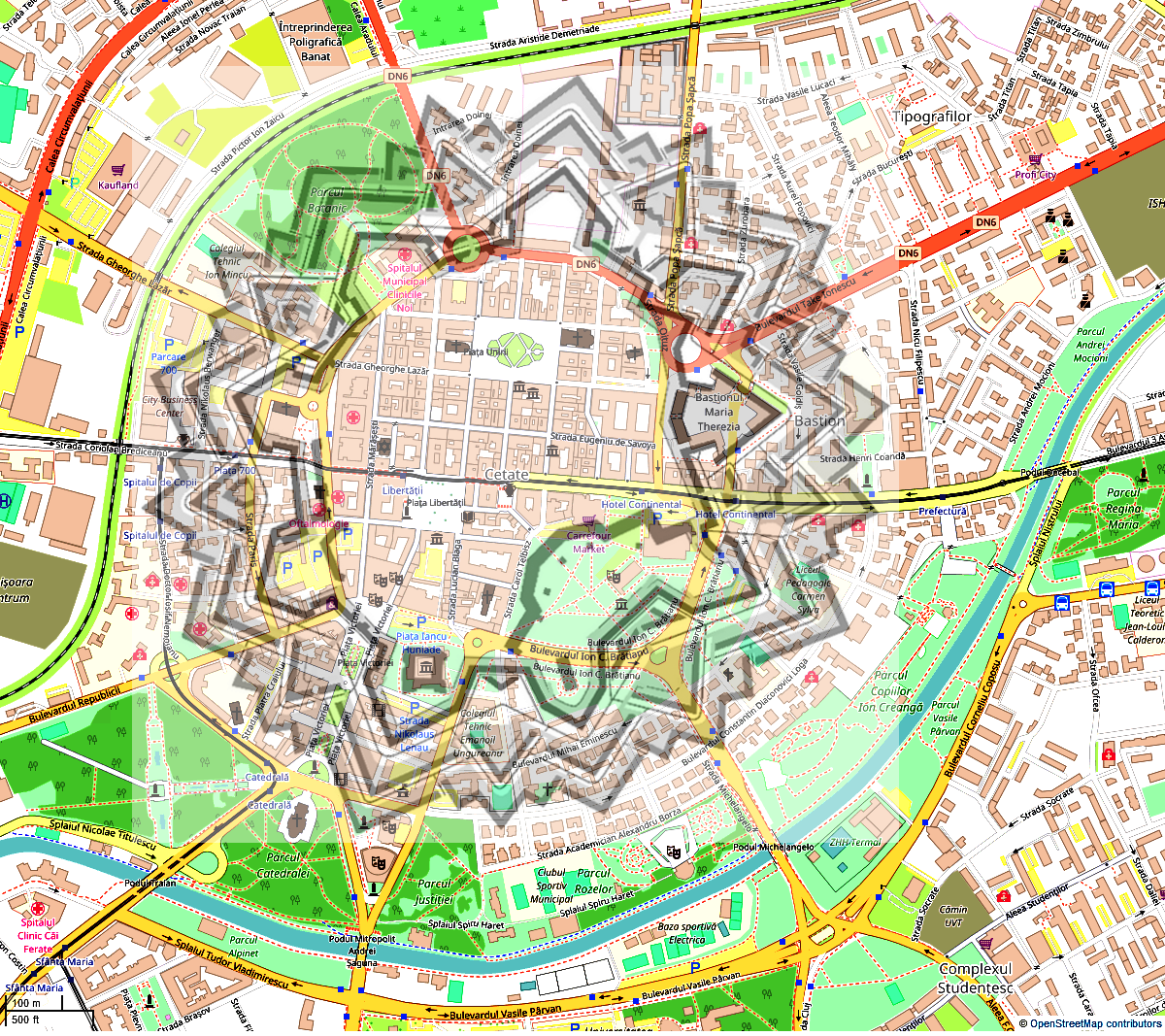
A plan of the Habsburg Fortress superimposed on a map of modern Timișoara

The vertical profile of the fortifications was of Vauban type, with three wall belts, each facing floodplains. The first wall belt, whose parapets are represented in red, consisted of nine bastions and curtain walls. The bastions and the ravelins were numbered with Roman numerals, clockwise, beginning with the ones from the northeast (similar to the figures on the dials of the clocks). The bastions were:

- I The Francisc Bastion, separated from the intra muros area; access was by means of a wooden bridge. On the left side it was flanked by an artillery platform and by a tenaille.
- II The Theresia Bastion, the only one which remains today, was the first defensive structure which was built and it was originally designed as ravelin. It has orillons and a retraction, because it was designed to function independently of the rest of the Fortress, even if it was penetrated.
- III The Joseph Bastion, which flanked the Transylvania Gate, had one orillon and a curved side.
- IV The Leopold Bastion (Hamilton Bastion, Bastion of the gunpowder magazine) had no orillorns and it was flanked by tenailles. A gunpowder magazine was placed on it.
- V The Castle Bastion, designed to protect the Huniade Castle, had one orillon directed to the Petrovaradin Gate.
- VI The Mercy Bastion, which flanked the Petrovaradin Gate to the west and protected the barracks of the fortification service and the dermatology hospital. It had orillons and the right flank was protected by an artillery platform.
- VII The Eugeniu Bastion protected the military and dermatology hospitals. It had orillons; the one on the left still exists next to Timișoara 700 Square. To the right it was flanked by a tenaille.
- VIII The Elisabetha Bastion flanked the Vienna Gate on the left. It had orillons and it was protected on both sides by tenailles.
- IX The Carol Bastion, which flanked the Vienna Gate to the right, had orillons and was protected on the left flank by a tenaille and on the right flank by an artillery platform.

The bastions had two levels for artillery: the inferior level from which to fire the cannons through embrasures, and the upper level, which was used to fire the cannons on the barbettes over the parapets.

The second wall belt, whose parapets are represented in brown, consisted of 7 ravelins flanking the bastions — excepting the Theresia bastion that was flanked by redans — and 9 counterguards of the bastions. The ravelins were flanked by caponiers. The ravelins on the northern side of the fortress were strengthened. Lunettes were placed on the ravelins between Mercy and Elisabetha bastions, and redans on the ones between Elisabetha and Francis bastions.

The third wall belt, whose parapets are represented in purple, was made up of the belt of the ravelins and the counterguards from the second wall belt. The belt was made up of nine other counterguards flanked by nine triple redans.

Access to the fortress was through three gates: The Vienna Gate (or The Gate of Arad, The Gate of Mehala) in the north-northwest of the fortress, between Elisabetha and Carol bastions, The Gate of Transylvania (or The Transylvanian Gate, Lugoj Gate) in the east of the fortress, between the bastions Theresia and Joseph, and The Gate of Petrovaradin (or The Gate of Belgrade, The Josephine Gate) in the southwest of the fortress, between Castle's and Mercy bastions. The gates were each separated by three bastions, and the fortifications besides them were supplemented. There were 5–6 parapets instead of three parapets at the gates of Vienna and Transylvania, and, at the gate of Petrovaradin, the access was made through a long bridge between the first and the second belts of fortifications.

In 1765 the last fortification work was completed. A new riverbed (the current Bega Canal) was dug. Initially, in order not to shelter attacking troops, the bank from the fortress had to continue the slope of the glacis, but over time, the water dug its own bed and the shore offered protection to potential attackers. The result had the same effect as if a parallel trench had been dug. Therefore, the work was considered a mistake, and it was exploited in the siege of 1849.

=== Siege of 1849 ===
On 13 March the Revolution of 1848 broke out in Vienna and on 15 March in Budapest. The news reached Timişoara on 18 March 1848. Following Ferdinand I of Austria’s decision on 3 October a state of siege was declared in the Kingdom of Hungary. The military commander of the fortress of Timișoara, Lieutenant Field marshal K.k. Juraj Rukavina Vidovgradski took over command of Timișoara.

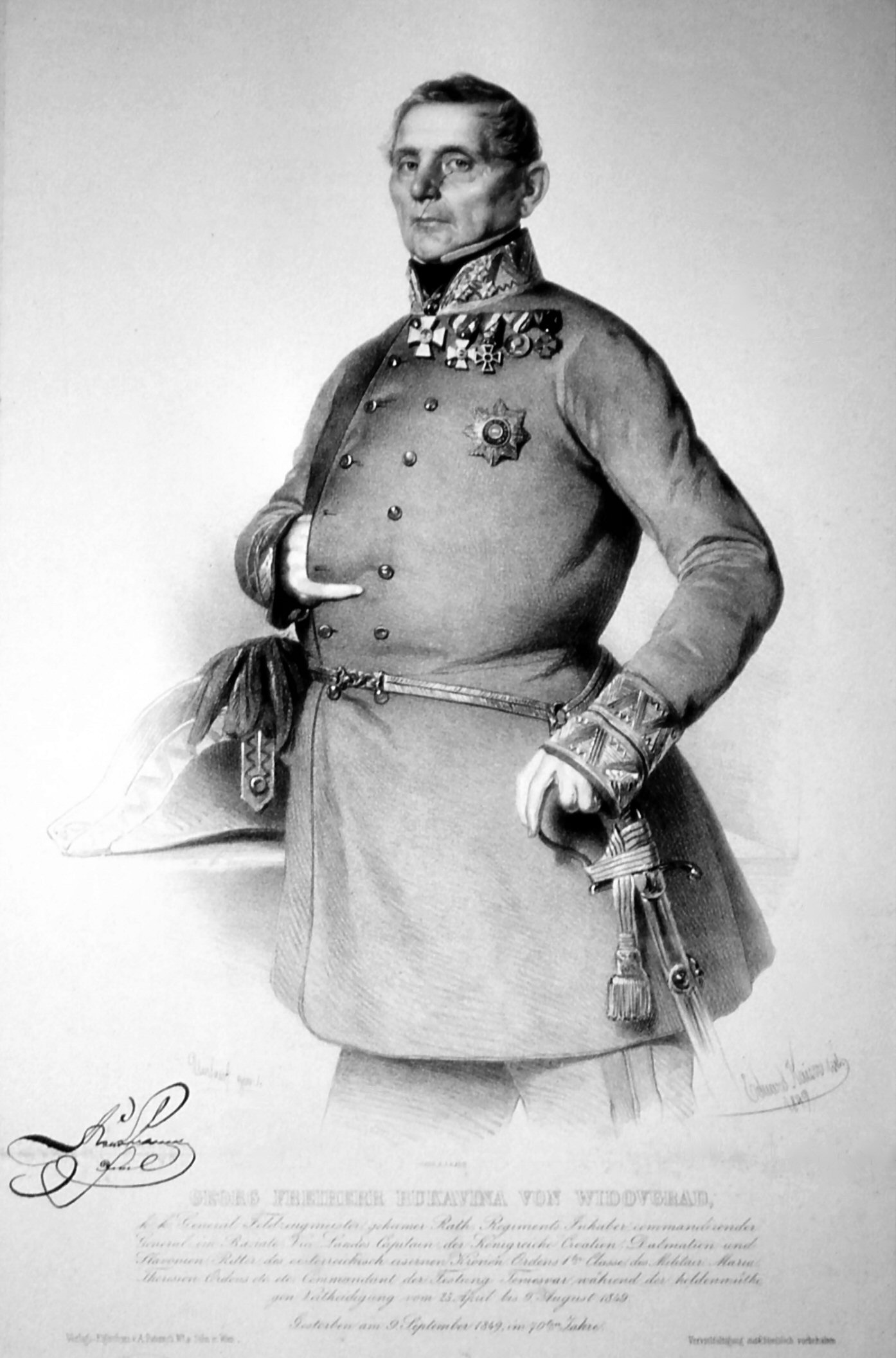
Juraj Rukavina

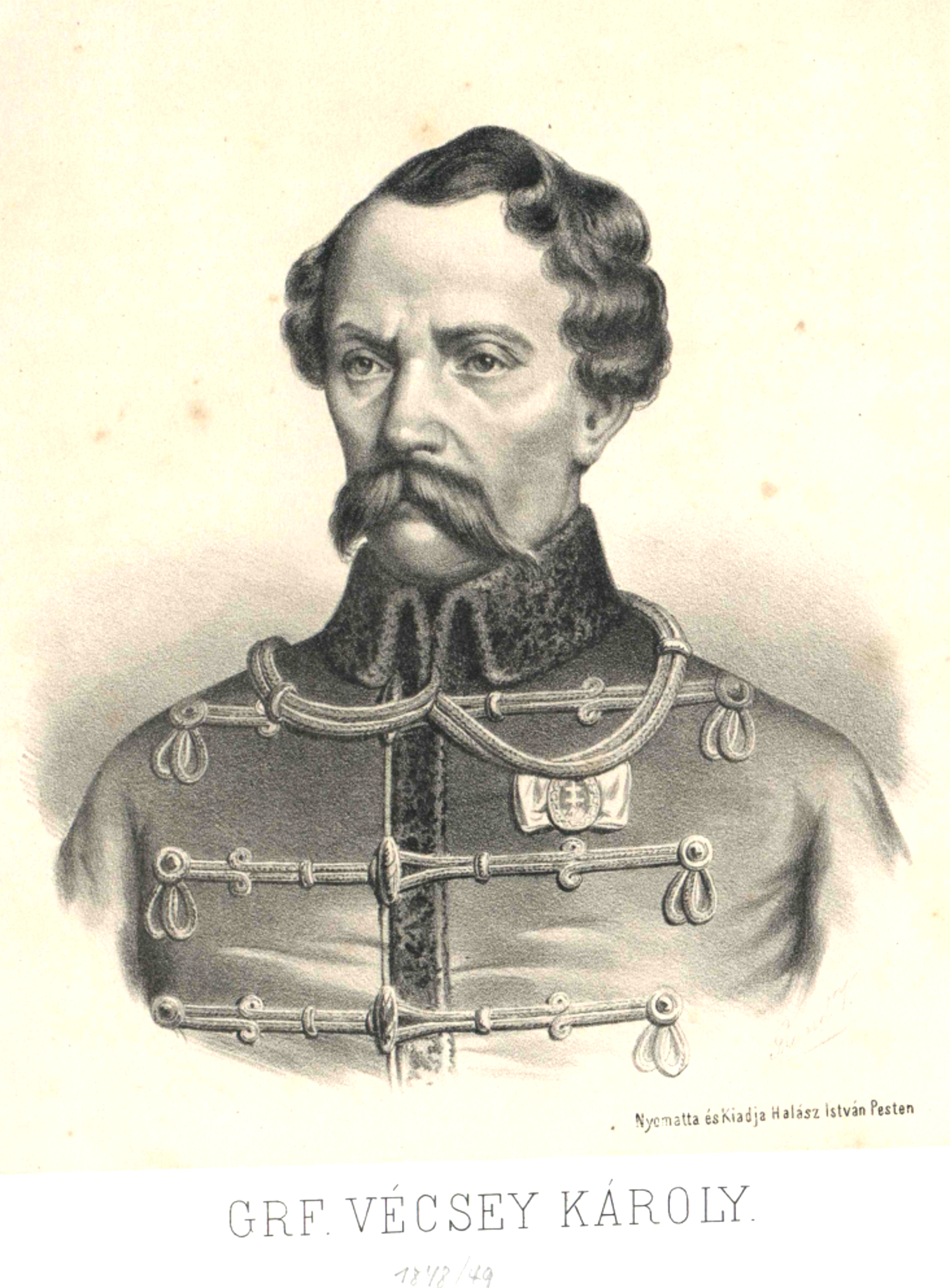
Károly Vécsey

The state of siege required the banning of riots, of groups larger than 6 persons and also imposed the surrender of the arms. In response, to the decree of Lajos Kossuth of 8 October – which demanded the flying of the Hungarian flag and loyalty to Hungary – the garrison of the city replied that Kossuth was declared outlaw by the decree of 3 October and therefore it was no longer obliged to follow Hungarian orders and would remain faithful to the Emperor and defend the Fortress.

Although the restoration of Timișoara Fortress was completed, due to the swampy ground the first heavy wall belt had sunk to some extent, making artillery fire difficult without threatening the defenders of the other two wall belts, and also the covertway. In the winter of 1848–1849 the fortress was supplied and reinforcements were sent. At the beginning of the siege the defense forces consisted of 8,851 people. It also had 1,272 horses and 213 functional cannons. There was enough gunpowder, but there were only 312 artillerymen and 17 military engineers.

On 14 May the attackers occupied Fabric and destroyed the drinking water supply pipe to the fortress. The defenders could use the 130 fountains in the fortress but only 13 of them provided drinking water. The lack of clean water led to epidemics.

The first bombardment of the fortress took place on 18 May. The bombardment intensified on 11 June, when the attackers put more guns in the battery. Nearly 2,000 shells landed in the Fortress area and almost all the buildings were hit. They were built of brick, with only Huniade Castle, the barracks, especially Transylvania Barracks, the Military Hospital and the crypts more strongly constructed. On 6 July the attackers installed further batteries and bombarded the fortress with about 30 mortars and 30 heavy cannon. On 20 July Kossuth visited the siege camp and asked Károly Vécsey, the siege commander, to capture the fortress at all costs. The bombardment continued. During its most intense phase the batteries had 36 mortars, 20 cannons, 13 howitzers and 22 field guns, altogether 91 pieces. On 5 August a parliamentarian demanded the surrender of the fortress but it was refused.

On 8 August movements were seen in the attackers’ camp, and the following day there was further movement. The sound of cannon fire was heard to the northwest, where the Battle of Temesvár was being fought. The Austrian troops led by Julius Jacob von Haynau defeated the Hungarian army commanded by Józef Bem, and Haynau entered Timișoara after 107 days of siege.

The losses among the garrison were not high: 161 dead, including 6 officers, 376 wounded, including 13 officers, 27 taken prisoner and 213 horses killed. However, the food supplies were exhausted, and typhus and cholera killed 2,000 people; after the siege a further 2,000 ill people died. Most of the buildings in the fortress were destroyed, including Huniade Castle, which was rebuilt in 1856, acquiring a totally different look.

On 14 June 1852, Emperor Franz Joseph visited Timișoara, where he laid the foundation stone of the Fidelity Monument (Note: LMI Code: TM-IV-m-A-06330.) in the Parade Square on 15 June.

=== Demolition ===
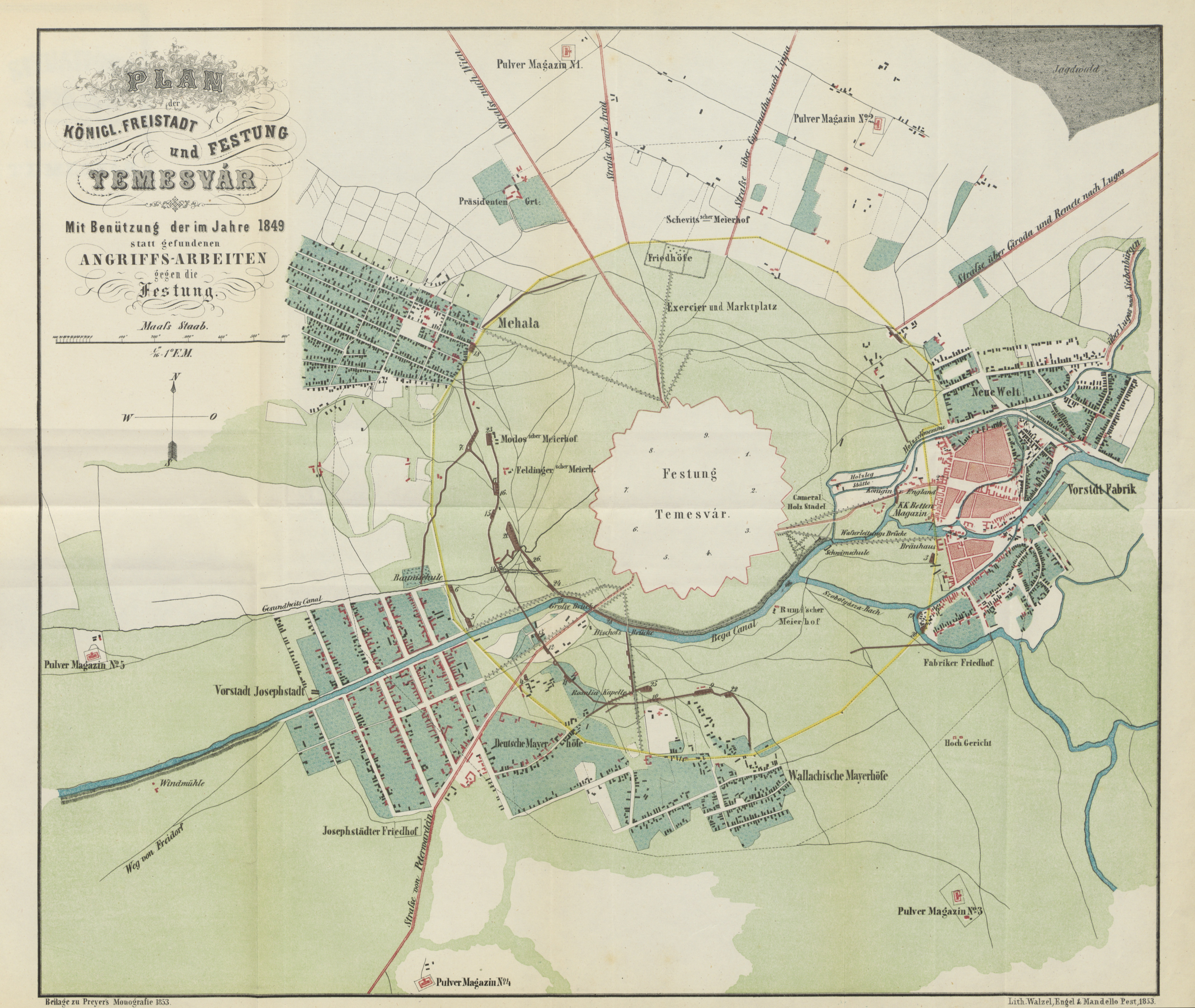
Plan of the city's surroundings in 1849, showing the esplanade of 500 klafter (950m)

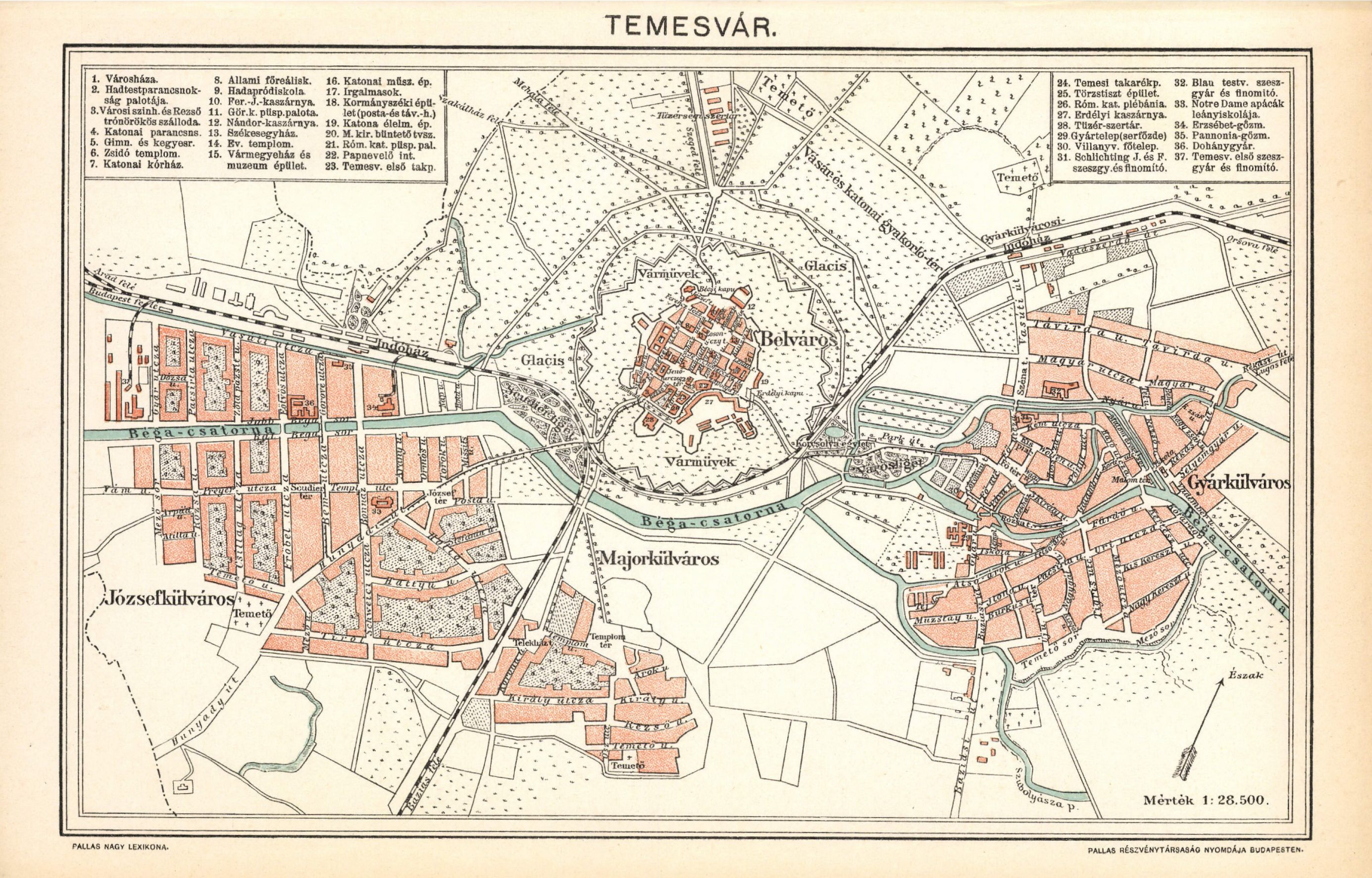
Plan of the city's surroundings at the beginning of the 20th century, showing the esplanade of 300 klafter (570m)

With the development of heavier artillery the fortifications became ineffective in the 19th century. Many cities' fortifications were torn down, for example at Vienna (Vienna Ring Road), or Paris (Thiers wall) where the Boulevard Périphérique appeared. Although the Timișoara Fortress was considered a large fortress, the intra muros area was too small for the town, the fortifications hindered the flow of traffic, and the esplanade occupied valuable space. The process of demolition began in 1859. At the request of the town, Franz Joseph decreed on 10 November 1868 that the non-aedificandi area be reduced from 500 Klafter (950 m) to 300 Klafter (570 m), allowing the suburbs to get closer to the fortress. However, the suburbs had to have the streets drawn radially towards the fortress to allow good sighting and enfilade fire in case of attack. The railway also had to comply with this requirement.

On 5 November 1872, based on a decision of the town magistrates, breaches in the walls were made to ease access to the fortress. In May 1891 Mayor Carol Telbisz renewed the request for demolition, which was approved by Franz Joseph on 23 April 1892. Although the negotiations for the purchase of land and buildings owned by the military authorities lasted until 1905, the demolition of the walls began in 1898.

The demolition involved the dismantling of the walls, the filling of the moats with the earthworks above the bastions, and the cleanup of the scrap materials by the municipal authorities. As a result, the town acquired an area of 138,460 m^{2} and 26 million bricks, of which 19 million were sold and the rest used for the foundations of various administrative buildings. The sale of the bricks covered the costs of demolition.

Plots of land were sold by the city, including plots on the glacis and on the esplanade, worth 1,906,512 Krone (about 570 kg of gold). The proceeds covered the cost of building a camp with barracks, a hay warehouse, a military tribunal and a garrison prison in the north of the city as agreed in compensation, as well as the systematization of the newly available land, the construction of several public buildings and additional economic and urban development of the town.

There is a 3D simulation on how Timișoara would have looked if the fortress had been preserved as it was in the 19th century. The intra muros area would have been very difficult to access, practically isolated, and the town would not be surrounded by its parks.

Images from the demolition time (c. 1900–1915)

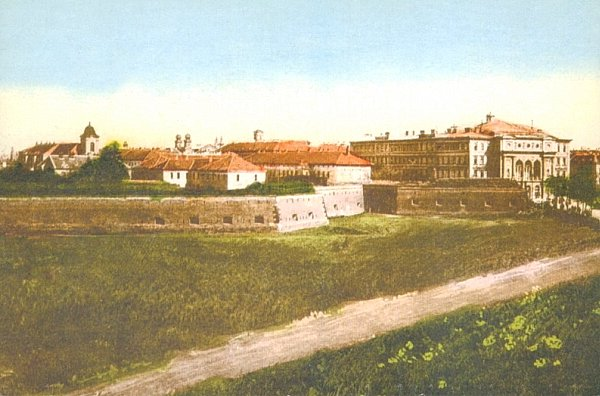
Eugeniu and Mercy bastions

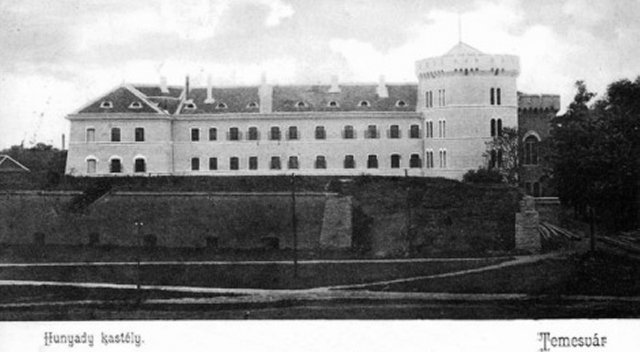
Castle's bastion, seen from the east

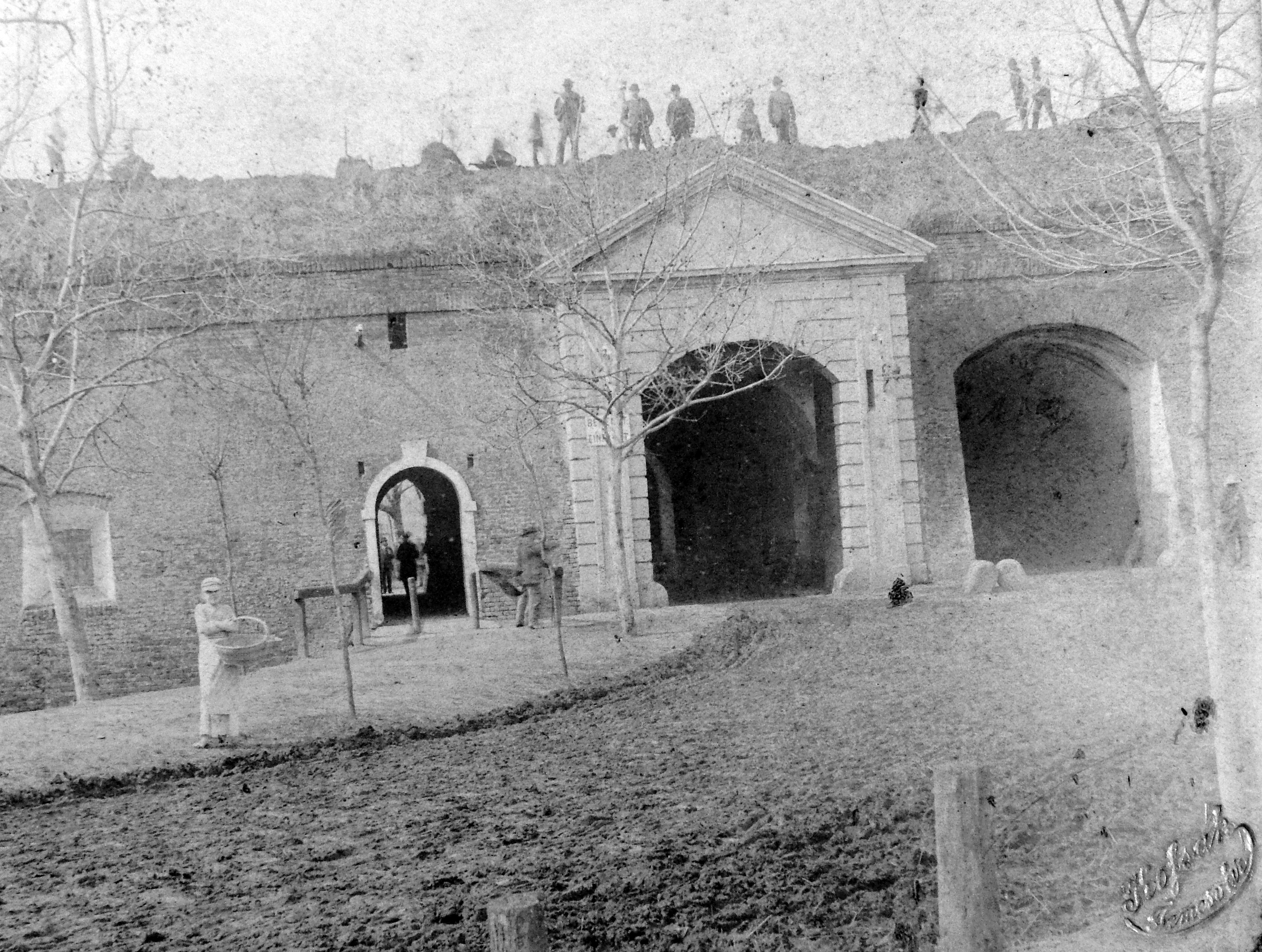
Demolition of the Transylvania Gate

== Renovations and archaeological research ==
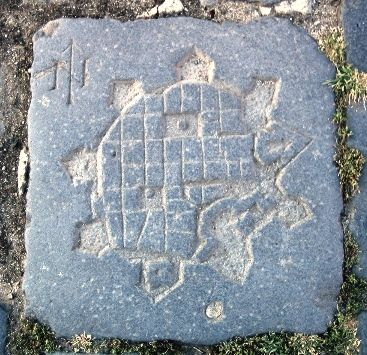
Plan of the Habsburg fortress in 1730, on a pavement stone of the Union Square. There is only a single defensive belt shown.

Under the management of architect Şerban Sturdza, Union Square was reconditioned in 1988. To mark the occasion a plan of the Habsburg fortress in 1730, with its 9 bastions, was engraved on a pavement stone. At the time it was believed that this was all of the fortification.

In 2006 excavations for foundations in the Eugeniu Bastion area uncovered the counterguards of the bastion, the trench of the moat between the counterguards and a weir. This was archaeological evidence of the three fortified belts of the Fortress. After being mapped and photographed they were demolished. In 2014, as part of the "Rehabilitation of public spaces in the historic center of Timișoara" project, a preventive archaeological excavation in Unirii Square confirmed the position of the Ottoman fortifications according to the Perrette map, as well as confirming their composition of earth stabilized with wood. As a part of the same project, during excavations at the intersection of the Dimitrie Cantemir Street and Lucian Blaga Street (in the southeast corner of the Liberty Square, stone walls bound with mortar from the northern wall of the Angevin fortress were found. In the southern part of Lucian Blaga Street a mortar floor with fragments of brick was discovered, probably the market mentioned by Evliya Çelebi.

== Condition in the 21st century ==
The "Cetate" quarter of Timișoara was built on the site of the Habsburg fortress and its glacis. The intra muros area has been declared a historical monument (national heritage site). (Note: LMI Code: TM-II-s-A-06095.) From the fortifications of the Habsburg fortress there remains the Huniade Castle, (Note: LMI Code: TM-II-m-A-06140.) a bastion, a fragment of another bastion, a casemate, and a small fragment of the courtain wall. All are historic monuments.

The only bastion almost entirely preserved is the Theresia Bastion. (Note: LMI Code: TM-II-m-A-06103.03.) This is a major tourist attraction. On the Alexandru Ioan Cuza Avenue (Note: At coordinates 45.7604°N 21.2277°E) there is a casemate from the VIII ravelin. (Note: LMI Code: TM-II-m-A-06103.01.) The casemate's role was to flank the Vienna Gate and it was also a gunpowder magazine.

To the north of Coriolan Brediceanu Street, in the Timișoara 700 Market (Note: At coordinates 45.7565°N 21.2239°E) there is a fragment from the Eugeniu Bastion – the orillon and the south flank of the bastion. (Note: LMI Code: TM-II-m-A-06103.02.) In the list of historical monuments, the bastions are considered a group. (Note: LMI code: TM-II-a-A-06103.) On Gheorghe Dima Street, in the Botanical Park (Note: At coordinates 45.75848°N 21.22538°E) there is still a small fragment of the courtain wall between the Elisabetha and Eugeniu bastions. (Note: LMI Code: TM-I-s-A-06050.)

All the remaining parts of the fortress walls

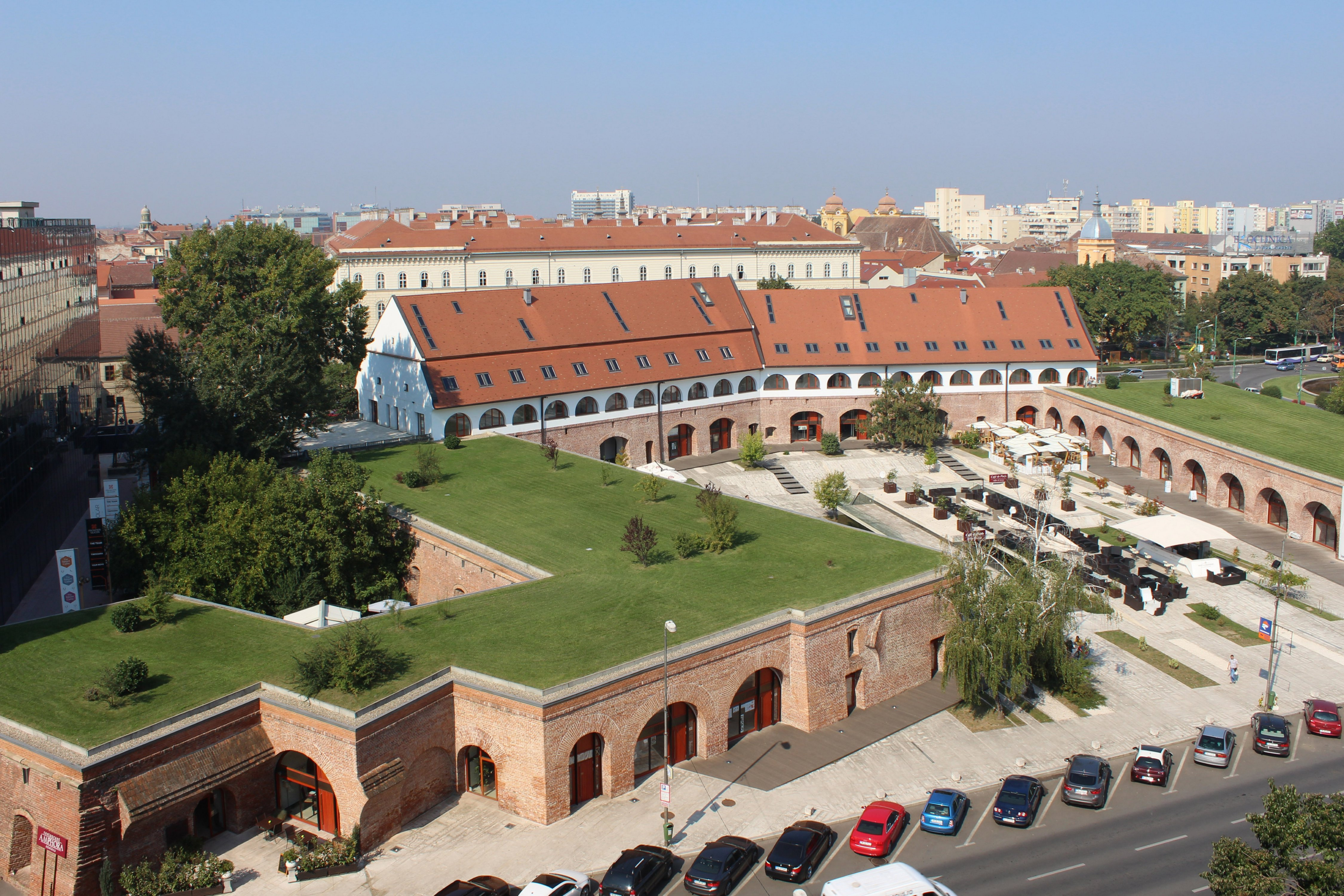
Theresia Bastion

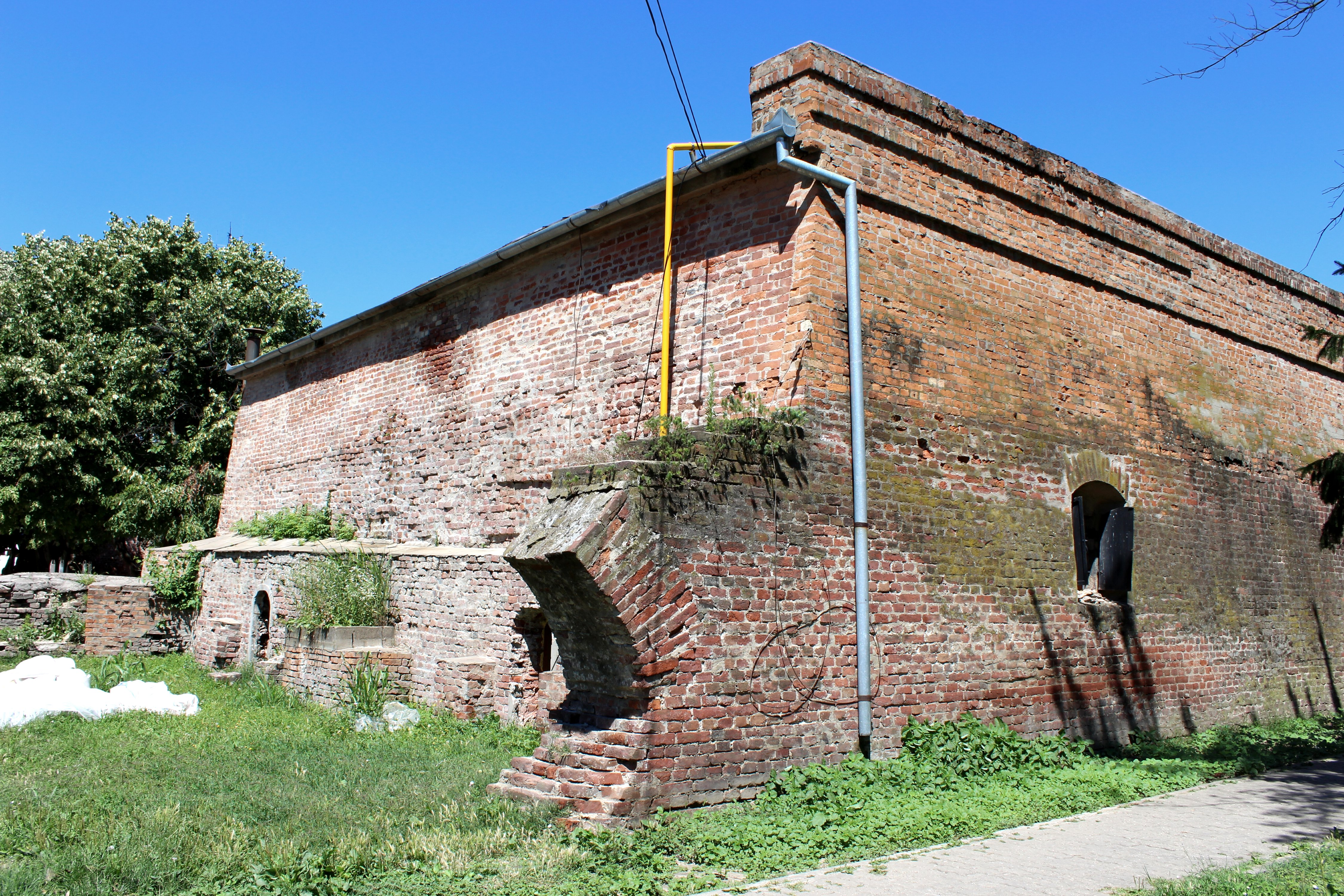
Fragment of Eugeniu Bastion

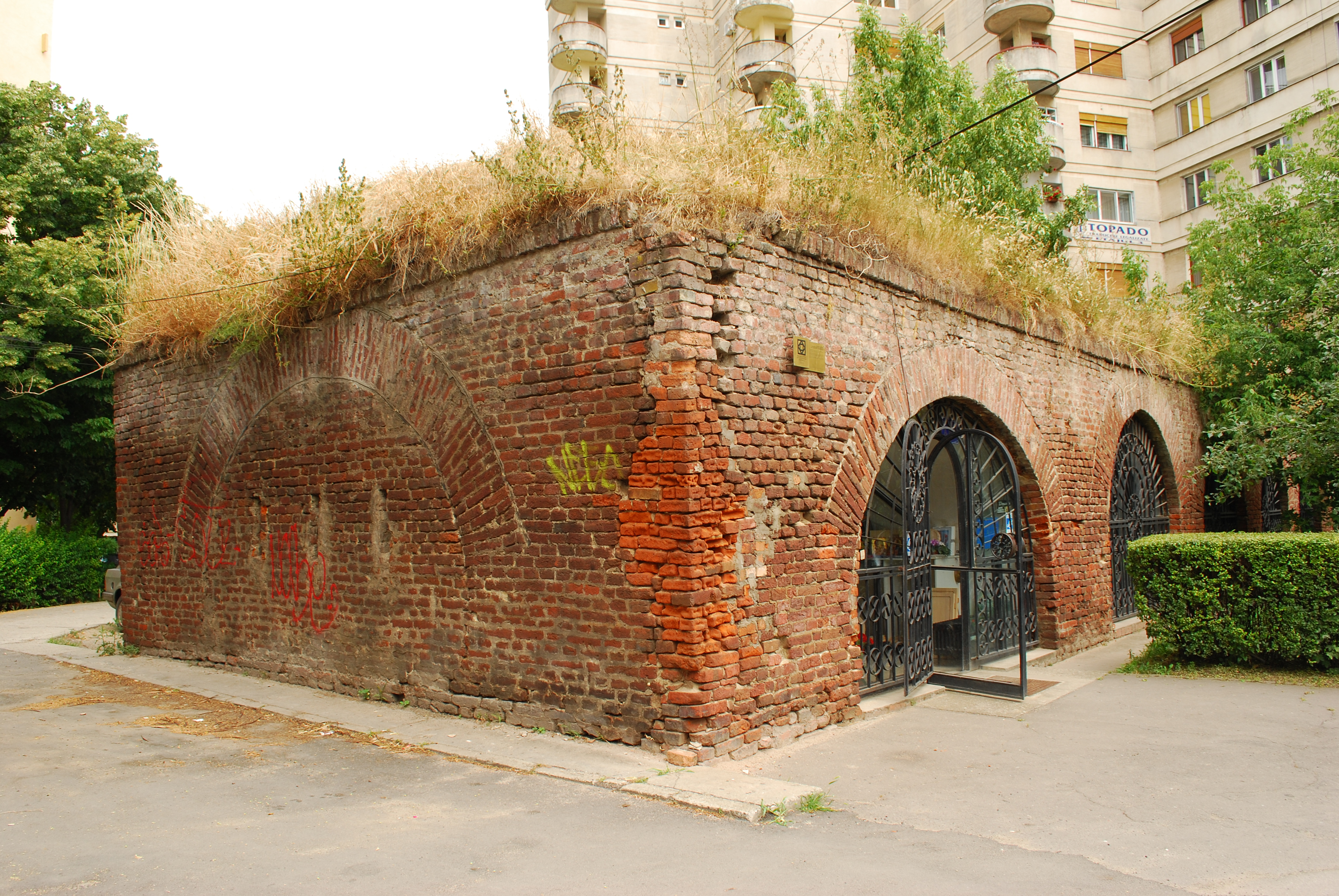
The casemate of ravelin no. VIII

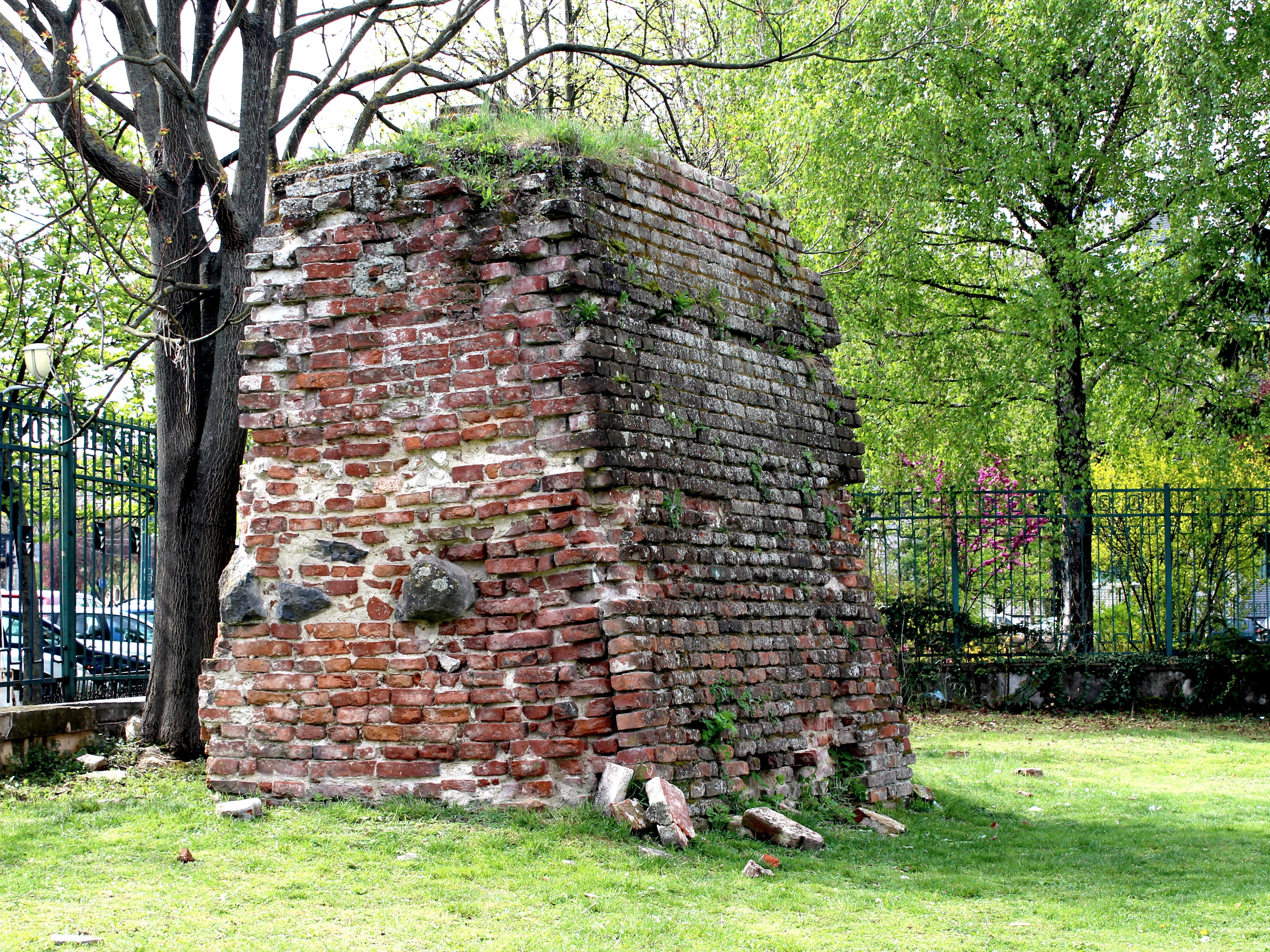
Courtain wall in the Botanical Park

== See also ==
- History of Timișoara
