= Botanical Park, Timișoara =

Arboretum in Timișoara, Romania

Botanical Park
- Botanical Garden
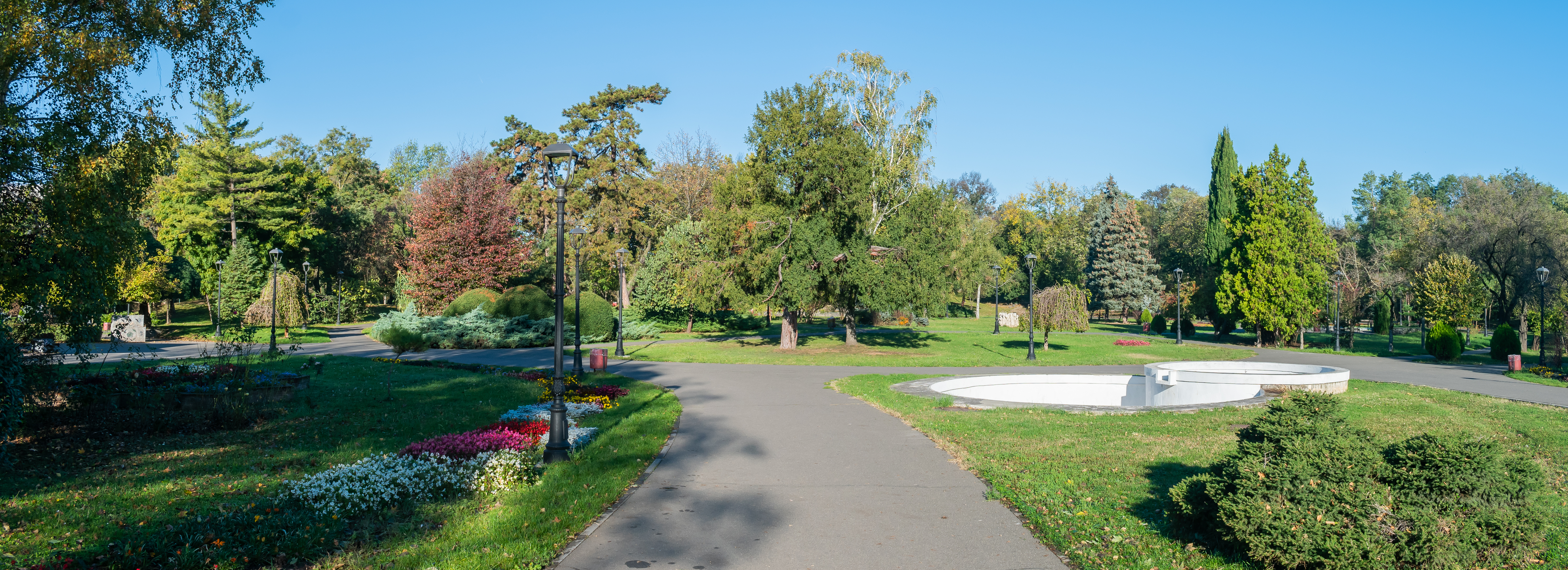
- Interactive map of Botanical Park
- Type: Urban park; arboretum; botanical garden; scientific reserve
- Location: Timișoara, Romania
- Coordinates: 45°45′36″N 21°13′29″E
- Area: 8.41 ha
- Opened: 1986
- Designer: Silvia Grumeza
- Administrator: Timișoara City Hall
- Species: 218

The Botanical Park, since 2007 the Botanical Garden, is an arboretum in Timișoara. Up to its development in the 1900s, the land on which the park is located today was used as a training ground for military exercises. Much earlier, the land was supposedly the site of a Roman cemetery.

Until 2009, the Botanical Park had the status of a botanical scientific reserve. It was granted protected status under HCJ no. 19/1995, which was later revoked by HCJ no. 69/2009.

== Location ==
The Botanical Park is located between Timișoara 700 Square and Mărăști Square, in the north of the Cetate district. The park is bordered by Gheorghe Dima, Gheorghe Lazăr, Alexandru Ioan Cuza and Pictor Ion Zaicu streets. The main entrance is located between the buildings of the Adam Müller-Guttenbrunn House and the New Clinics.

== History ==
The first plans for a Botanical Garden in Timișoara date from 1877, when the city council made available to the Society of Natural Sciences of Banat (founded in 1873) the former pig market, today Pleven Square, for the construction of a botanical park. Due to the lack of necessary funds, the society had to give up the project. Between 1902 and 1903, with the construction of the Cadet School (today the New Clinics), a park was arranged around the building by landscaper Árpád Mühle. The park was already part of the project developed by Árpád Mühle and Franz Niemetz, which provided for the long-term construction of a green area consisting of parks and forests around the city. Within this project, the city authorities have already foreseen around World War I the establishment of a park on the current land of the botanical garden, a park also recorded on the perspective plans, laid out on the city map of 1913. On the city map of 1936, the area appears as a park with a series of alleys, with the look they have today.

The current appearance of the park is due to architect Silvia Grumeza who, in 1966, after a previous documentation at the Bucharest Botanical Garden, elaborated a project. The park was designed to fulfill multiple functions: scientific, didactic, educational and recreational. The Municipal People's Council approved the location proposal on 29 January 1972, during a meeting attended by the directors of the botanical gardens in Bucharest, Cluj, and Craiova, who participated as invited consultants. Between 1986 and 1990, 1,650 plant species were planted here, all designed according to phytogeographical and aesthetic criteria. The plants were brought from parks all over the country, from private collections or from international seed exchanges. The park was opened to visitors on 29 June 1986. By that time, the park had 60,000 visitors per year, with over 11,000 entries in May alone. Beginning in 1987, the garden issued a seed catalog for exchange with other botanical gardens both domestically and internationally, an activity that was discontinued after 1992. In 2008, a garden with a traditional Japanese teahouse was set up in the park.

== Sectors ==
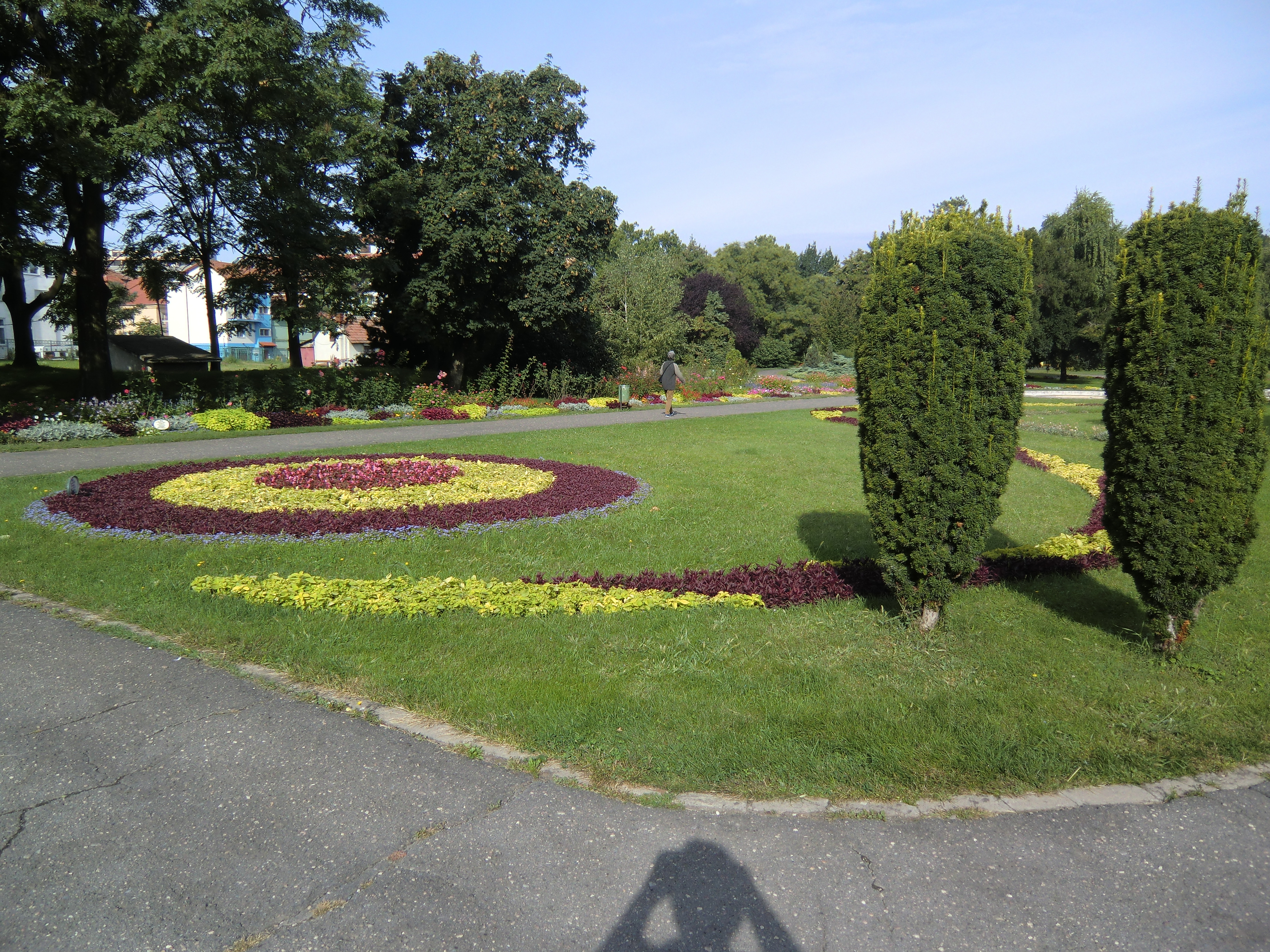
The systematic plant sector

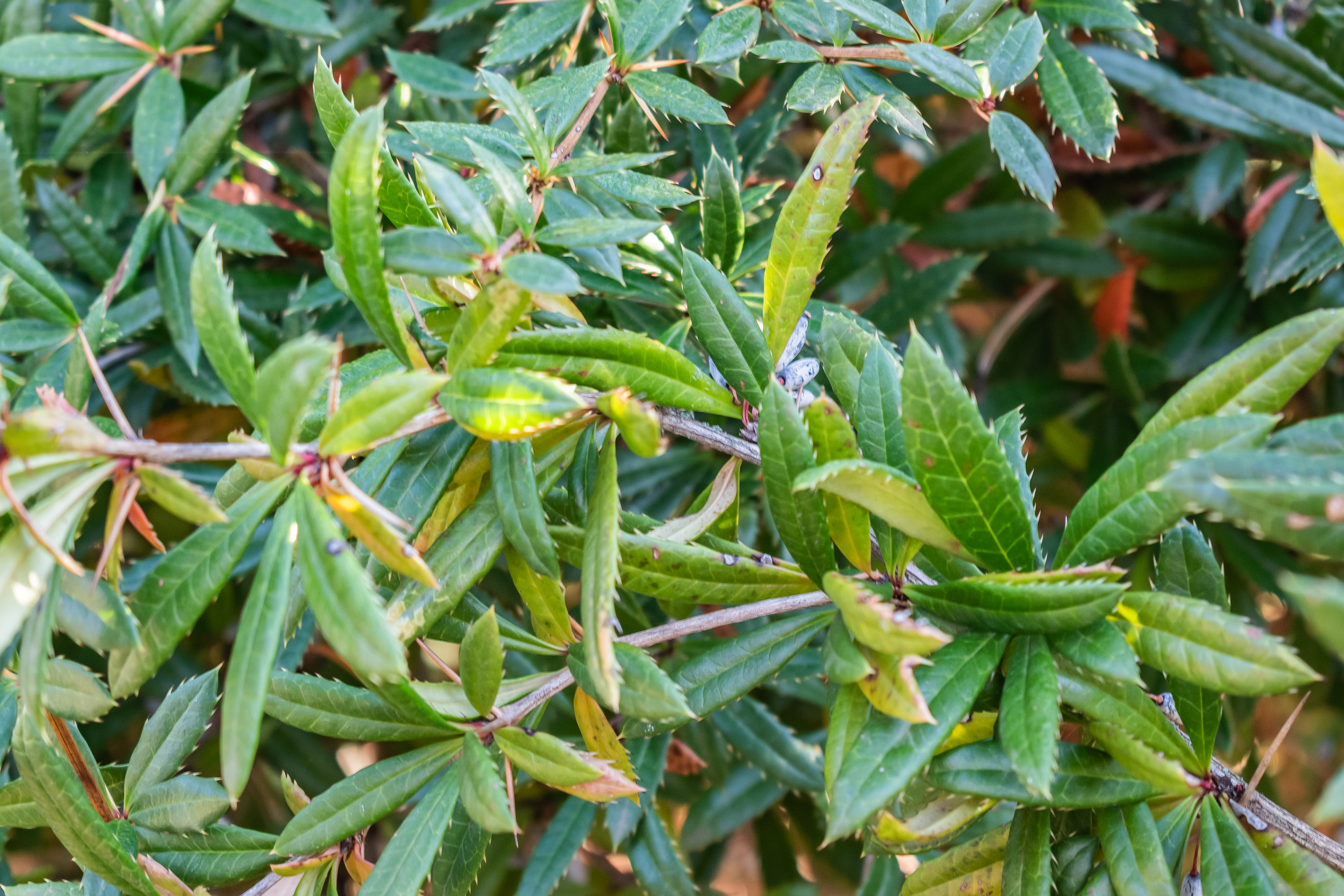
Prunus laurocerasus (cherry laurel) in the Botanical Park

The Botanical Park has an area of about 84,000 m^{2}, of which 74,500 covered by lawn and trees and 7,500 by alleys. Silvia Grumeza's original design placed the main entrance on Gheorghe Dima Street, leading into a ground-level area of decorative herbaceous plants, which remains in place today. To the left of the entrance was the ornamental plants section, which also included the greenhouse complex and administrative headquarters. The central area, aligned with the entrance, was designated as the systematic sector—intended to represent the genealogical tree of the plant kingdom, as is customary in botanical gardens. This area was designed with concentric pathways bordered by plant beds surrounding a central basin.

Encircling the systematic sector, a semicircular phytogeographic sector was planned, incorporating the existing woody vegetation. This area was meant to highlight the flora of Banat, featuring sub-sectors dedicated to karst flora on the left, Domogled flora on the right, and Semenic flora in the center. Beyond an almost circular ring path, additional sectors showcased flora from other geographic regions: Mediterranean flora, North American flora, Asian flora, and, in the western corner, a section for cultivated plants. Subsequently, due to misguided decisions, the central area originally intended for the systematic sector was instead planted with medicinal species.

Following a revision of the garden's layout in 1986, it is now organized into the following sectors:

- ornamental flora (1.6 ha), with a subsector – rose collection;
- flora and vegetation of Romania (2.4 ha), with a subsector – flora of Banat (0.75 ha);
- flora of the Mediterranean region (0.6 ha);
- flora of America (1.8 ha);
- flora of Asia (1 ha), with a subsector – Japanese garden;
- systematic plant sector (0.7 ha);
- medicinal flora (0.25 ha);
- tropical flora (0.1 ha).

The Botanical Park is home to rare species that cannot be found in any other park in the city:

- Kalopanax pictus (castor aralia)
- Cercidiphyllum japonicum (katsura)
- Chionanthus retusus (Chinese fringetree)
- Diospyros lotus (date-plum)
- Tetradium daniellii (bee-bee tree)
- Kolkwitzia amabilis (beautybush)
- Phyllostachys aurea (fishpole bamboo)
- Quercus macrocarpa (bur oak)
- Frangula rupestris (rock buckthorn)
- Viburnum carlesii (arrowwood)
- Zanthoxylum piperitum (Japanese pepper)
- Ziziphus jujuba (jujube)
- Xanthoceras sorbifolium (yellowhorn)

The entrance area was landscaped in 2025 with perennial plants and shrubs of the species Verbena, Crocosmia, Berberis, Lonicera, Hydrangea, Viburnum, Spiraea, etc.
