= Grecescu =

Grecescu is a Romanian surname that may refer to:

- Constantin Grecescu (1929–1996), Romanian long-distance runner
- Dimitrie Grecescu (1841–1910), Romanian botanist, physician, and historiographer
- Florica Grecescu (born 1932), Romanian middle-distance runner

== See also ==
- Grecescu Church, a Romanian Orthodox church
