= Timișoara Regional Institute of Oncology =

Geography
- Location: 139 Grigore Alexandrescu Street, Timișoara, Romania
- Coordinates: 45°46′44″N 21°12′28″E

Organisation
- Type: Specialist

Services
- Emergency department: Yes
- Beds: 529
- Speciality: Oncology

History
- Constructed: 2025

The Regional Institute of Oncology (Romanian: Institutul Regional de Oncologie) is a planned oncology hospital in Timișoara, Romania. Developed on the site of the former Municipal Hospital, which was constructed and subsequently abandoned in 1994, it will serve the western region of the country.

It will feature 450 beds for day hospitalization and outpatient care, along with comprehensive diagnostic services including laboratory analyses, imaging, endoscopy, and functional explorations. Additional facilities include an operating theatre, intensive care unit, radiotherapy and nuclear medicine laboratories, and a bone marrow transplant and stem cell apheresis center. The hospital will also house an oncology emergency reception center and dedicated study and research areas, such as a multipurpose room, study rooms, practical presentation spaces, and offices. The total built area of the hospital is 16,554 m^{2}, with a developed area of 65,419 m^{2}.

== Construction ==
At the future oncology institute site lies a decommissioned, unfinished 1990s building once intended for the Timișoara Municipal Hospital. The project therefore involves consolidating, partly demolishing, and expanding the existing structure, as well as constructing nine new buildings totaling over 65,000 m^{2} of developed area.

The feasibility study was prepared by the consortium formed by Popp & Asociații, Square BAU, and Professional Tech Construct Design. Popp & Asociații also serves as the general contractor. The technical and economic indicators were approved in August 2023, and the tender was launched only a year later.

In March 2025, the National Investment Company named Construcții Erbașu as the winner of the tender, which will build the hospital in partnership with Concelex, Terragaz, and Hellimed. Three bids were submitted, involving around 60 commercial companies in total. Construction costs amount to 250 million euros, initially financed through PNRR funds. Although the austerity measures introduced by the Bolojan Cabinet put the hospital's financing at risk, Health Minister Alexandru Rogobete assured that the works will proceed using non-refundable European funds.

Demolition works began in July 2025. Roughly 90% of the decommissioned building will be demolished, with only a section intended for offices remaining, which may be integrated into the new hospital.

== Services ==
The hospital will include 395 beds for inpatient care, 57 beds for day hospitalization, 57 for day surgery, 20 for intensive care, and 10 in the Center for Bone Marrow Transplantation and Stem Cell Apheresis. The project provides 152 parking spaces and complies with the nZEB+ energy efficiency standard.

The hospital will comprise seven operating rooms within its operating theatre; a specialized outpatient clinic with 26 consultation offices and a treatment room; an oncology emergency reception center; and dedicated departments for diagnostic imaging, endoscopy and functional exploration, nuclear medicine, and radiotherapy. It will also house a bone marrow transplant and stem cell apheresis center, along with a wide range of complementary service areas, including reception and waiting zones, administrative offices, a pharmacy, food services, a transfusion unit, medical analysis and anatomopathology laboratories, and sterilization services.
