= Dimitrie Brândză =

Romanian botanist (1846–1895)

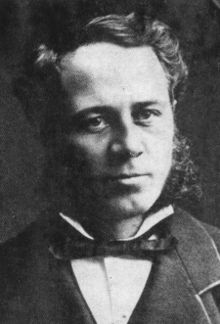
Dimitrie Brândză

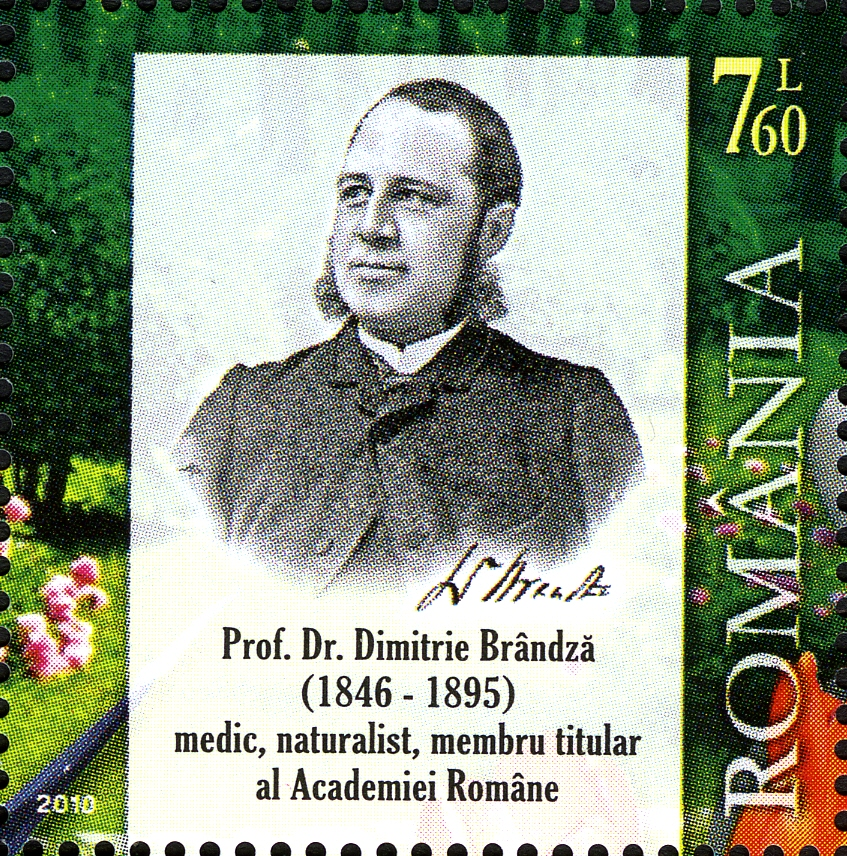
Poșta Română stamp from 2010

Dimitrie Brândză (Romanian pronunciation: [diˈmitri.e ˈbrɨnzə]; October 22, 1846–August 15, 1895) was a Romanian botanist. He founded the Botanical Garden of Bucharest, which is now named in his honor.

Brândză was born in Viișoara, Botoșani County. After studying at the Academia Mihăileană in Iași, he earned a Ph.D. from the University of Paris in 1869. He was a professor at the University of Iași and the University of Bucharest. In 1879 he was elected titular member of the Romanian Academy.

He died in Slănic-Moldova and was buried at Bellu Cemetery, in Bucharest.

== Taxa named in honour ==
There are number of plants with specific name brandzae. Including; Iris brandzae, Agropyron brandzae Pantu & Solacolu. and Verbascum glabratum subsp. brandzae.

Also a mussel in the Unionidae family is named, Potomida brandzae (Sabba S. Ștefănescu, 1896).
