= Mărăști Square =

- City square
- {{{other_names}}}
- Piața Mărăști
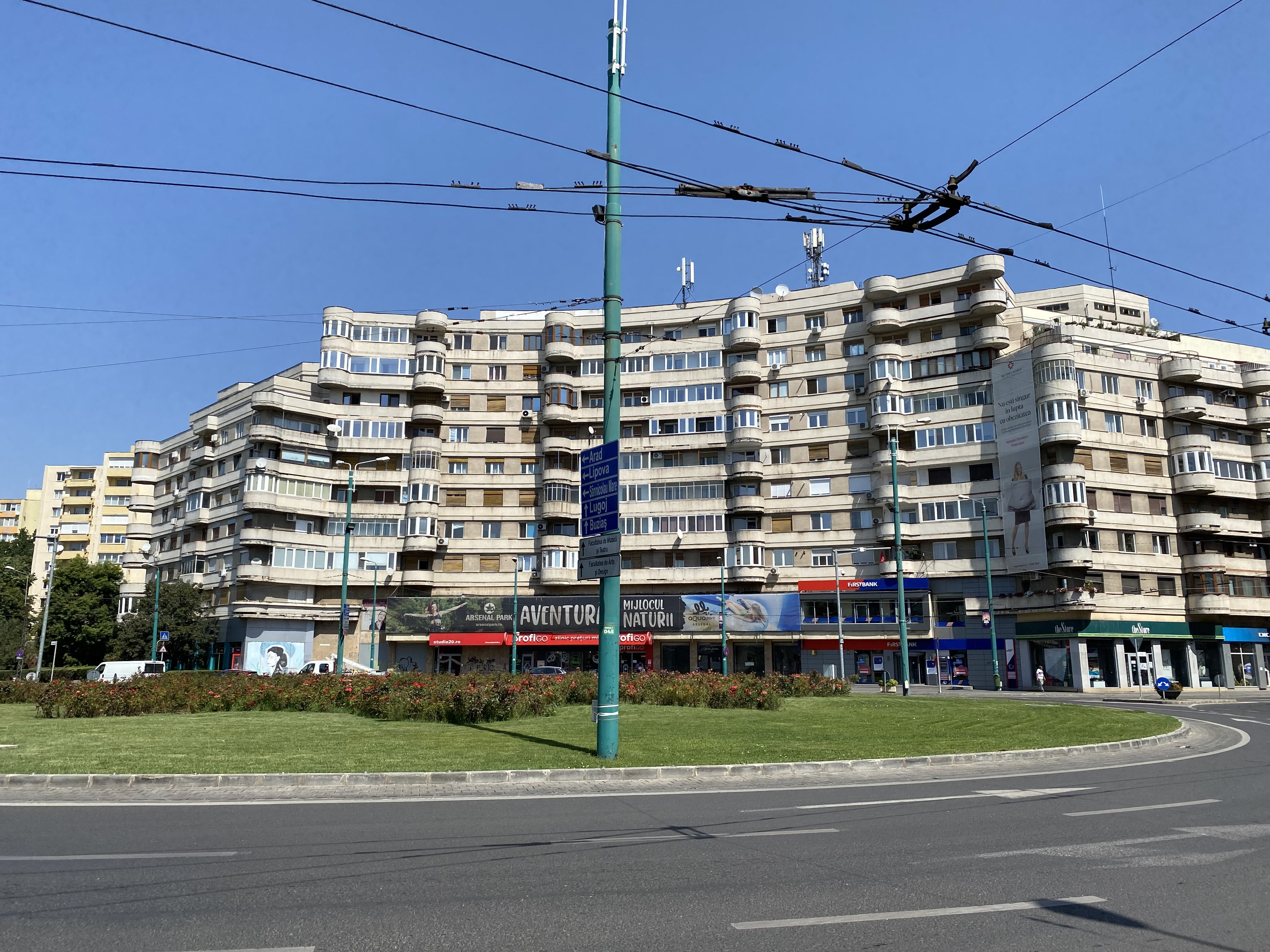
- Length: 284.81 m
- Area: 7,000 m^{2} (75,000 sq ft)
- Dedicated to: Battle of Mărăști
- Location: Cetate, Timișoara
- Interactive map of Mărăști Square
- Coordinates: 45°45′34″N 21°13′40″E

Mărăști Square (Romanian: Piața Mărăști) is a public square in Timișoara, Romania. The square is essentially a roundabout featuring a 19th-century map of the Timișoara Fortress, artistically laid out in roses and grass at its center. It stands on the former site of the Vienna Gate—the most prominent and ornately decorated entrance to the fortress. Today, the area is surrounded by communist-era apartment blocks, the now-dilapidated Vienna Barracks, the New Clinics, and various eclectic or historicist buildings in differing stages of restoration. The square is named after the Battle of Mărăști, one of the key battles fought on Romanian soil during World War I.

== Location ==
It is located at the northern limit of the former Timișoara Fortress. There are two main boulevards in the area: Cetății, with the Circumvalațiunii neighborhood, and Take Ionescu, with the Tipografilor neighborhood. The square has an area of approximately 7,000 m^{2}.

== Archaeological discoveries ==
During the 2018 expansion of the roundabout in Mărăști Square to three lanes, the site of the former Vienna Gate was uncovered. Some elements of the gate are now preserved at Huniade Castle. Archaeological excavations at the site also revealed parts of the Timișoara Fortress bastion wall and a 19th-century cobblestone pavement. In addition, remnants from the Ottoman period were uncovered, including the fire chamber used to heat the Turkish baths and 14 fragments of ceramic pipes.

== Transport ==
The trolleybus station located in the square provides access to lines 11, 13, 14, 17, and 18, the metropolitan lines M11 and M14, and the express line E4b.
