= Viișoara, Botoșani =

Viișoara
- Commune
- Location in Botoșani County

- Location in Romania
- Coordinates: 48°10′N 26°44′E
- Country: Romania
- County: Botoșani
- Subdivisions: Viișoara, Cuza Vodă, Viișoara Mică

Government
  - Mayor (2024–2028): Laurențiu Constantin Rîmbu (PSD)
- Area: 47.76 km^{2} (18.44 sq mi)
- Elevation: 151 m (495 ft)
- Population (2021-12-01): 1,551
  - Density: 32/km^{2} (84/sq mi)
- Time zone: EET/EEST (UTC+2/+3)
- Postal code: 717455
- Area code: +40 x31
- Vehicle reg.: BT
- Website: www.comuna-viisoara-botosani.ro

Viișoara is a commune in Botoșani County, Western Moldavia, Romania. It is composed of three villages: Cuza Vodă, Viișoara, and Viișoara Mică.

== Natives ==
- Dimitrie Brândză (1846–1895), Romanian botanist
