= Timișoara Municipal Hospital =

Municipal Emergency Clinical Hospital

Geography
- Location: Timișoara, Romania
- Coordinates: 45°45′34″N 21°13′35″E

Services
- Emergency department: Yes
- Beds: 1,018

History
- Opened: 2011

Links
- Website: www.spitalul-municipal-timisoara.ro

The Municipal Emergency Clinical Hospital (Romanian: Spitalul Clinic Municipal de Urgență) was founded as a result of the decision no. 1990 of 6 October 2011 of the Timișoara Local Council through the merger of several municipal clinics. The Municipal Hospital comprises 27 departments with 1,018 beds, about half of which are surgical beds.

== Departments ==
The 27 departments of the Municipal Hospital are spread across several clinics and hospitals, as follows.

=== New Clinics ===
The clinics grouped under the name Clinicile Noi ("New Clinics") are located on 5 Gheorghe Dima Street, near the Botanical Park and Mărăști Square.

- Anesthesia and Intensive Care Clinic I
- Gastroenterology Compartment
- General Surgery Clinic I
- General Surgery Clinic II – Oncology
- Hematology Clinic
- Internal Medicine Clinic
- Thoracic Surgery Clinic
- University Emergency Clinic

The New Clinics operate in the former building of the Infantry Cadet School (German: Kaiserlich und Königlich Infanterie Kadettenschule), founded in 1869. The structure was erected between 1902 and 1903 on the site of a former bastion demolished at the end of the 19th century, based on the plans of military engineer and architect Alfred Wärner. After World War I, in 1921, the Artillery Officers' Training School relocated here and remained until 1940, when it was transferred to Pitești. Following nationalization in 1948, the building and its annexes were assigned to the Municipal Hospital in 1950. Over time, some of the annexes were demolished, while restoration and rehabilitation works carried out in a Brutalist style led to the removal of the façade decorations, statues, and the monumental attic. The original brick and wrought-iron fence surrounding the property also disappeared.

=== Dumitru Popescu Clinical Hospital of Obstetrics and Gynecology ===
In 1921, gynecologist Ludwig Diel founded Timișoara's second women's sanatorium in Iosefin. Diel studied surgery and gynecology at the University of Budapest and later pursued further training with Professors Hans von Haberer and August Bier. Following nationalization in 1948, the Dumitru Popescu Clinical Hospital of Obstetrics and Gynecology was established from this foundation. In August 2011, it became part of the Municipal Hospital and is now represented by six departments.

- Anesthesia and Intensive Care Clinic II
- Neonatology Clinic
- Obstetrics and Gynecology Clinic I
- Obstetrics and Gynecology Clinic II
- Obstetrics and Gynecology Clinic III
- Obstetrics and Gynecology Clinic IV

=== Polyclinic No. 3 ===
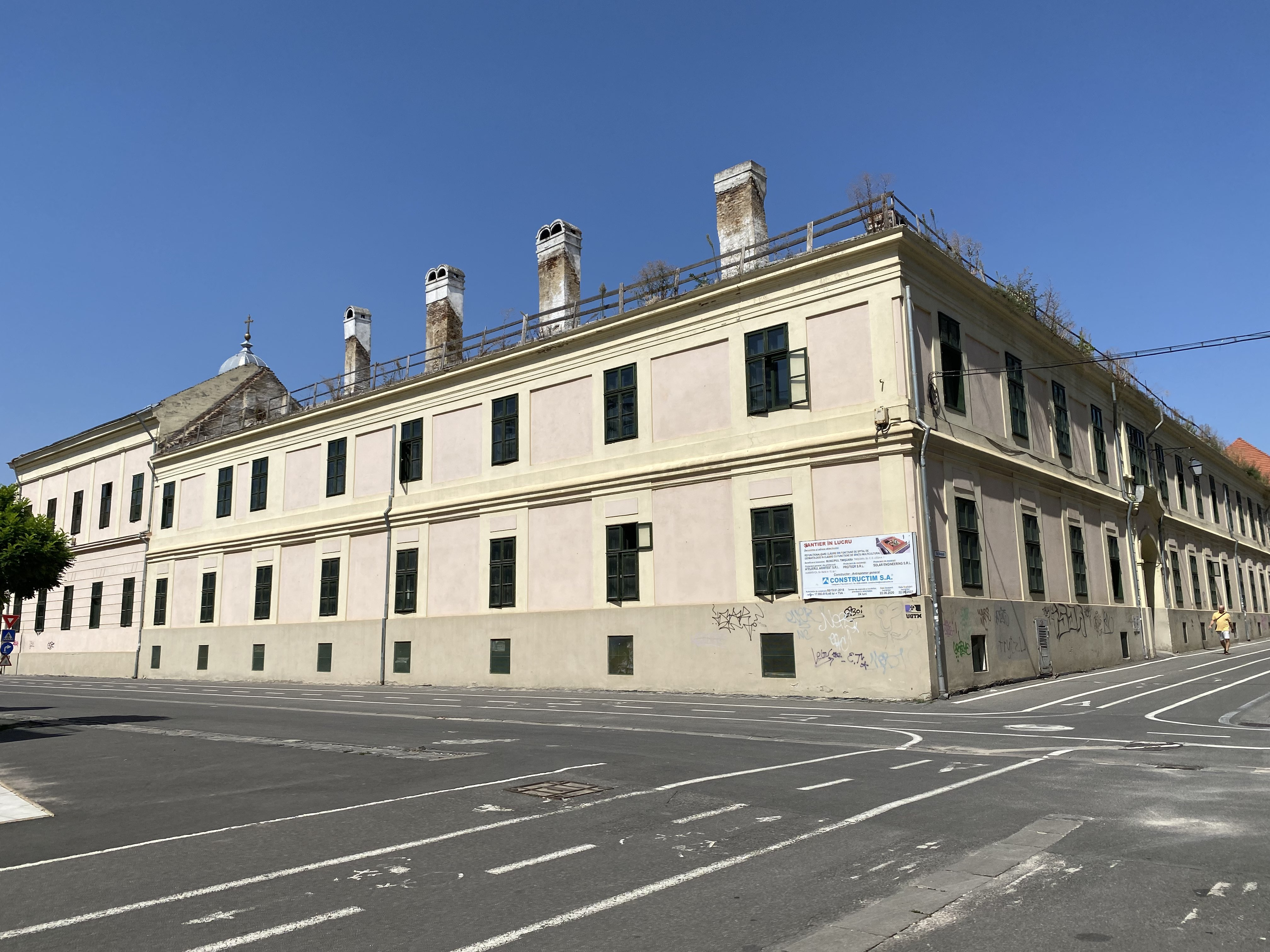
The former Dermatovenerology Clinic

The four-story building with a total area of 3,550 m^{2} was inaugurated in November 2015. On the ground floor and partially on the first floor it houses Polyclinic No. 3, on the first, second, and third floors, the Dermatovenerology Clinic, and on the fourth floor, a pharmacy, a laboratory, and a teaching area. The Dermatovenerology Clinic operated until that date in a historic building on Mărășești Street, built between 1744 and 1745 and which housed the first civil city hospital on the territory of the Habsburg Empire.

=== Other departments ===
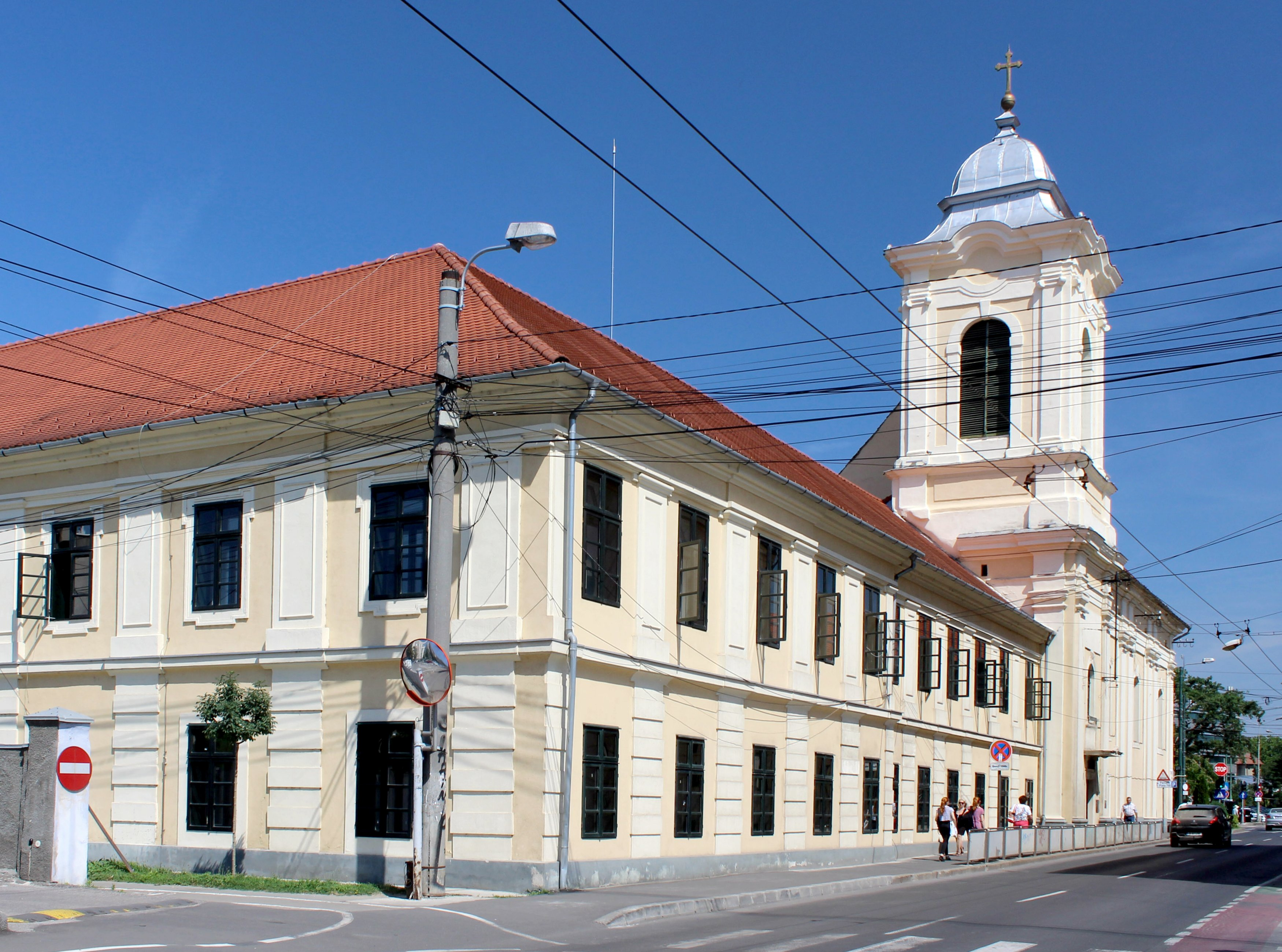
The Ophthalmology Clinic

- Cardiology Clinic – ASCAR (12 1989 Revolution Boulevard)
- Dentistry Office (9 1989 Revolution Boulevard)
- Geriatrics and Gerontology Compartment (3 Saint Rosalia Street)
- Medical Oncology Clinic (22 Victor Babeș Street)
- Occupational Medicine Compartment (12 1989 Revolution Boulevard)
- Ophthalmology Clinic (Martyr Radian Belici Square)
- Oral and Maxillofacial Surgery Clinic (5 Take Ionescu Boulevard)
- Otolaryngology Clinic (6 1989 Revolution Boulevard)
- Radiotherapy Clinic (22 Victor Babeș Street)
- Rehabilitation, Physical Medicine and Balneology Clinic (42–44 Constantin Diaconovici Loga Boulevard)
- Transfusion Unit I (5 Gheorghe Dima Street)
- Transfusion Unit II (1–3 Alexandru Odobescu Street)
