= Misericordia Hospital, Timișoara =

Misericordia Hospital
- Ophthalmology Clinic
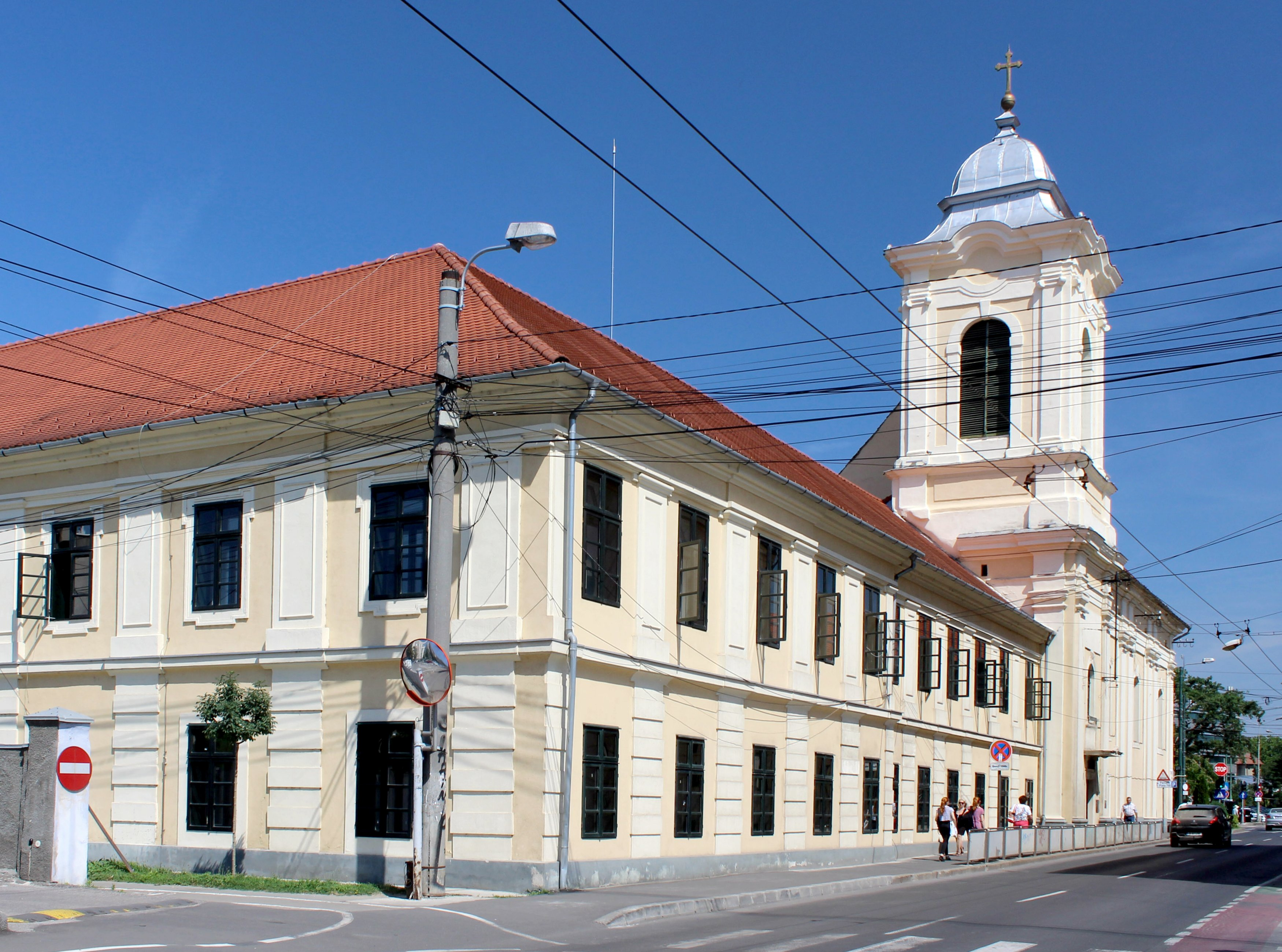

Geography
- Location: Timișoara, Romania
- Coordinates: 45°45′20″N 21°13′31″E

Organisation
- Type: Specialist
- Network: Timișoara Municipal Emergency Clinical Hospital

Services
- Beds: 60
- Speciality: Ophthalmology

History
- Constructed: 1735
- Opened: 1737

The Misericordia Hospital (Romanian: Spitalul Mizericordienilor), currently the Ophthalmology Clinic, is the oldest hospital in Timișoara, as well as the oldest public hospital on the current territory of Romania. The building, a historical monument under the LMI code TM-II-m-A-06164.02, is a joint building with the Misericordia Church.

== History ==
On 5 April 1724, the Franciscans of the city founded an association of Saint John of Nepomuk. This association began the construction of the first hospital in Timișoara in 1735. The foundation stone was laid by Bishop Franz Anton Engl von Wagrain. An inscription in Latin was placed on the foundation stone, recording the fact that the establishment was dedicated to charitable purposes. The hospital was located near the northwest gate of the fortifications, which were also in the early stages of construction.

On 1 November 1737, the president of Banat, Johann Andreas von Hamilton, who was also the president of the brotherhood of Saint John of Nepomuk, gave the new hospital to the use of the Misericordian Order. With the consent of Emperor Charles VI, six Misericordian monks were transferred to Timisoara, under the leadership of the vicar Paulinus Temele. They also opened the first pharmacy in the city, called Zum Granatapfel, on the right side of the building. On the site of the first pharmacy, the Misericordia Church was built between 1748 and 1757, with the financial support of Empress Maria Theresa.

During the plague epidemic of 1738–39, the Brothers of Mercy selflessly cared for the sick, and four of them lost their own lives.

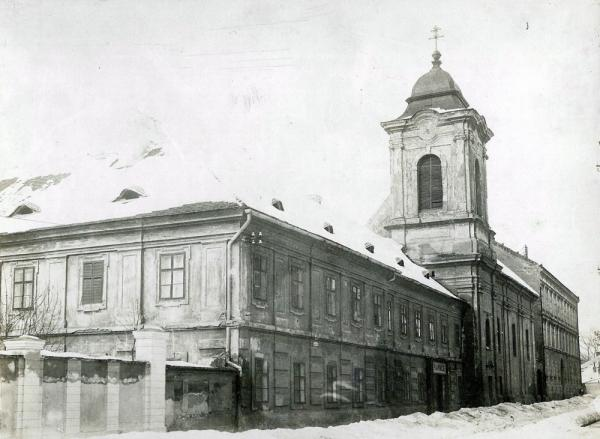
The Misericordia Hospital in the interwar period

During the siege of Timișoara by the Hungarian revolutionaries, both the church and the Misericordia Hospital burned down to their foundations on the night of 6–7 July 1849. At the same time, a valuable library also fell victim to the fire. Restorations followed immediately after the destruction, in 1851, with the church also being repaired, and from 1853 there is a direct reference to the operation of the hospital with a capacity of 400 patients per year.

== Ophthalmology Clinic ==
In 1931, after studying medicine at universities in Tübingen, Freiburg im Breisgau, Munich, Berlin Charité, Würzburg, and Heidelberg, Hans Röhrich took charge of the hospital and initiated a medical transformation. He began modernizing the hospital according to contemporary medical standards and expanded it into a surgical clinic. The hospital was equipped with 55 beds. Röhrich established the first surgical-urological department in Timișoara, performed the first intrathoracic surgeries, and carried out the first lung removal in Romania. In 1931, 300 surgeries were performed, and by the end of that year, the number had increased to 600. Over the following years, the number of surgeries ranged from 800 to 1,200 annually.

On 1 October 1948, the Misericordia Hospital was nationalized. The University Clinic for Ophthalmology was set up in the building. Its development began in 1947 in the City Hospital under the direction of Nikolaus Blatt and was moved to the Misericordia Hospital a year later. In 2011, the Ophthalmology Clinic was affiliated to the newly established Municipal Emergency Clinical Hospital, functioning as a department of it since then.
