= Grecescu Church =

Orthodox church in Drobeta-Turnu Severin, Romania

Coordinates: 44.623457°N 22.645128°E

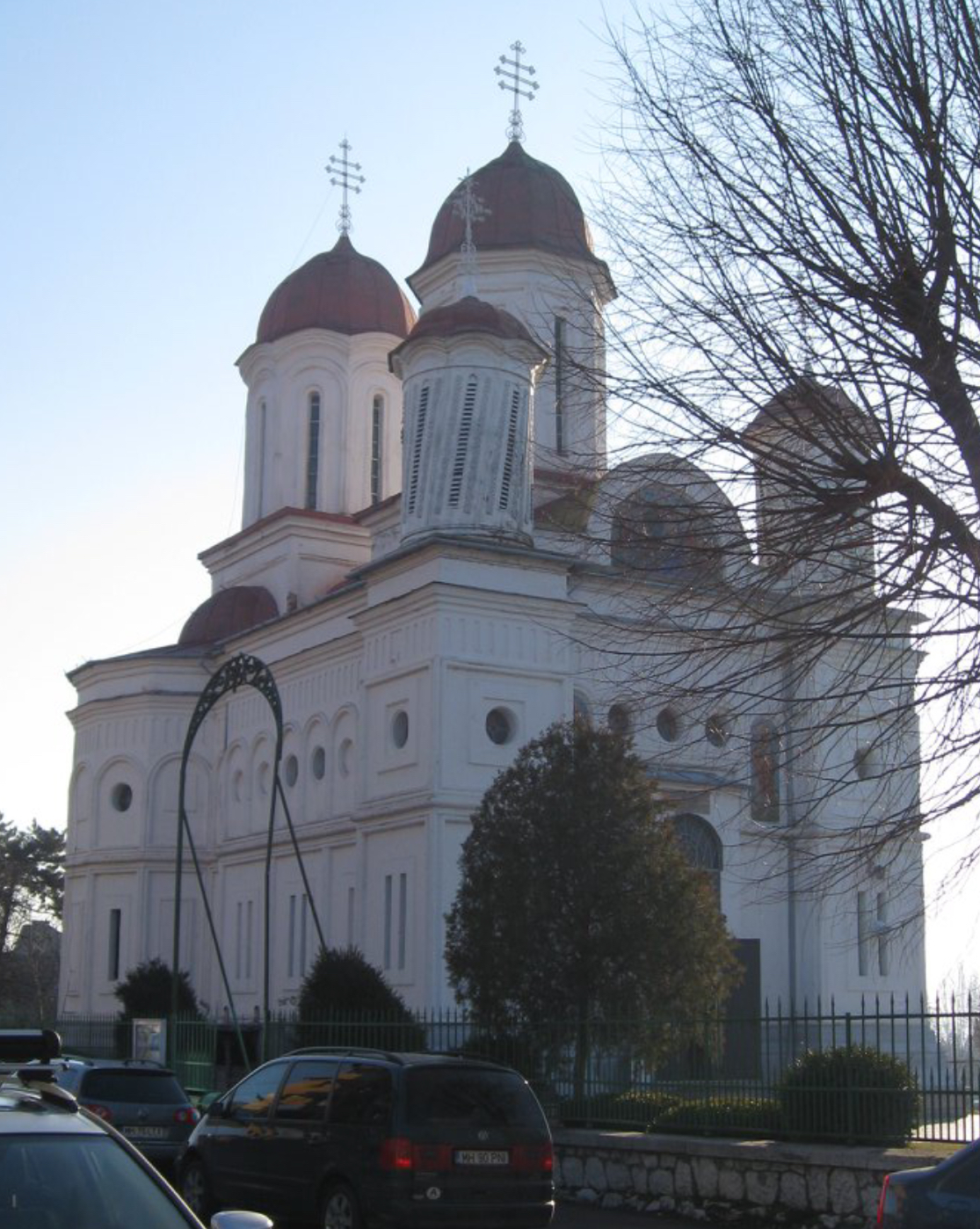
Grecescu Church

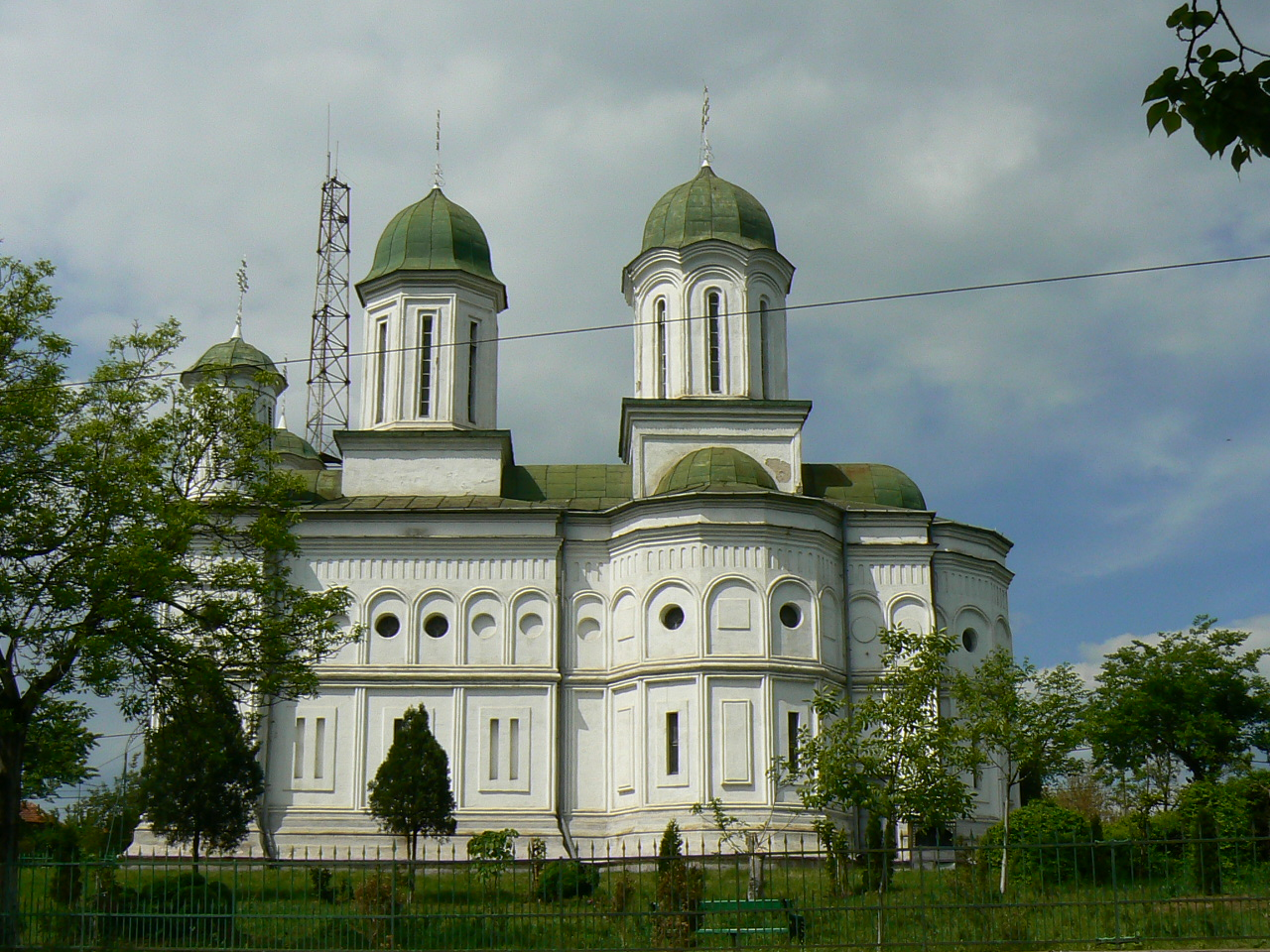
Lateral view

The Grecescu Church (Romanian: Biserica Grecescu) is a Romanian Orthodox church located at 2 Decebal Street in Drobeta-Turnu Severin, Romania. It is dedicated to Saint John the Baptist.

The ktetors were a boyar couple, Ioan Stoian Grecescu and his wife Ioana. In 1863, Ioan asked to build a church in the city center, but delays by the authorities angered him, prompting him to build a hospital with the materials he had purchased. Grecescu did not abandon the idea of a church, purchasing a plot of land near the hospital, overlooking the Danube. Further delays caused local residents to protest. Moreover, in 1867, Prince Carol I was on a visit to the city. He met Grecescu and, through the effort of his traveling companion Carol Davila, quickly arranged for plans to be drawn up in the capital Bucharest by the city architect.

The cornerstone was laid on 10 May 1868, the second anniversary of Carol’s accession to the throne. It was modeled after the Curtea de Argeș Cathedral, with two small spires in front, and fitting into the classic style of old Romanian monasteries. The building is solid brick. Construction proceeded rapidly, with Carol inspecting progress in spring 1869. Gheorghe Tattarescu painted the interior in 1872; he was paid 1,000 florins by another couple. Grecescu died in 1875, when the church was nearly finished. It was consecrated the following year.

In 1884, the church was named the city cathedral. For some time, its maintenance was paid out of Grecescu’s will, and then by the parish once his funds were exhausted. The brass roof was removed by the occupying German Army in 1917, during World War I, and replaced in 1920. The roof and walls suffered damage during the Allied bombing of 1944, and further repairs were carried out after the 1977 earthquake.

The church is listed as a historic monument by Romania's Ministry of Culture and Religious Affairs, which gives a completion date of 1873.
