= Bucharest Botanical Garden =

Botanical garden in Bucharest, Romania

- Grădina Botanică "Dimitrie Brândză" a Universității din București
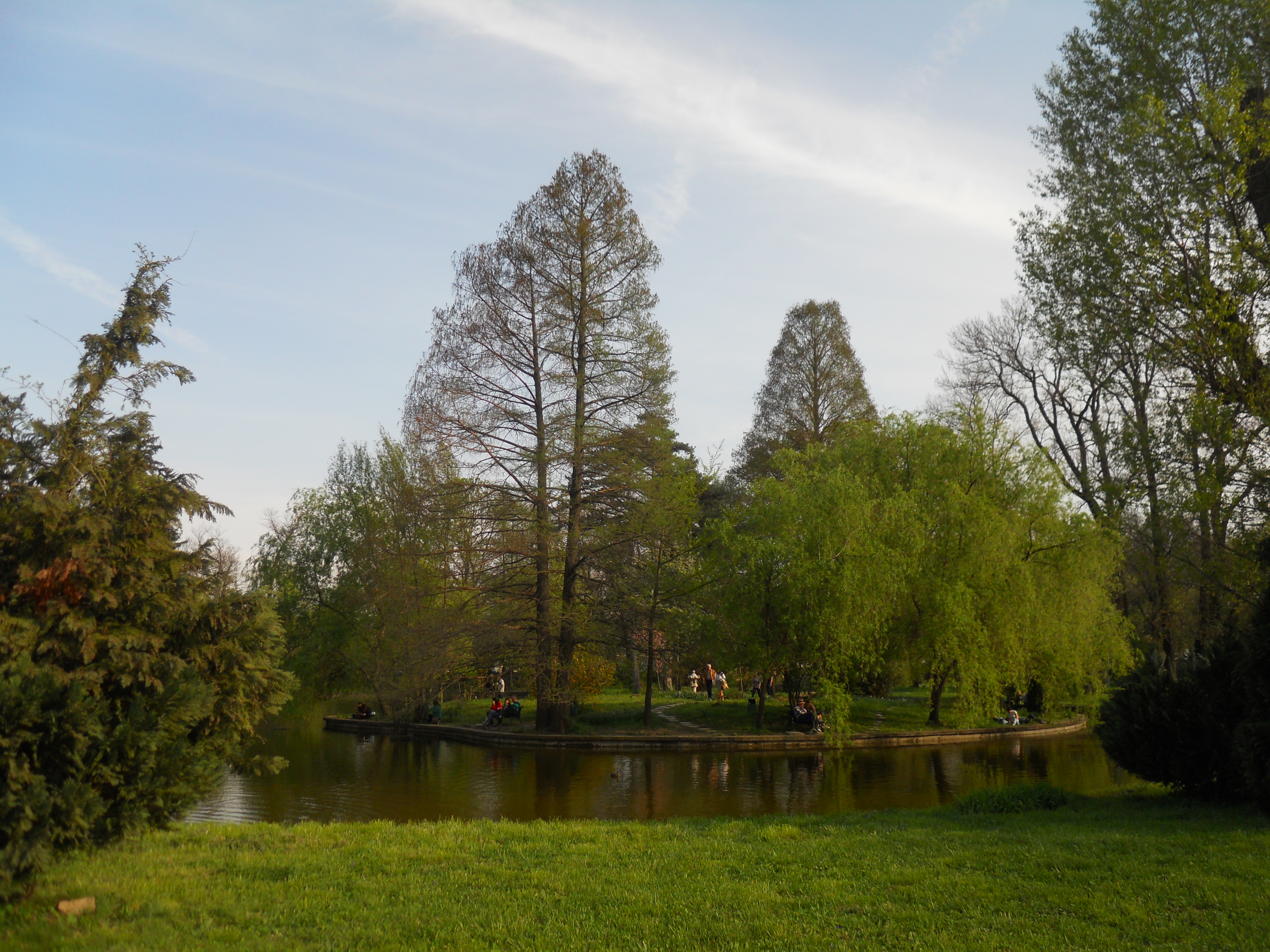

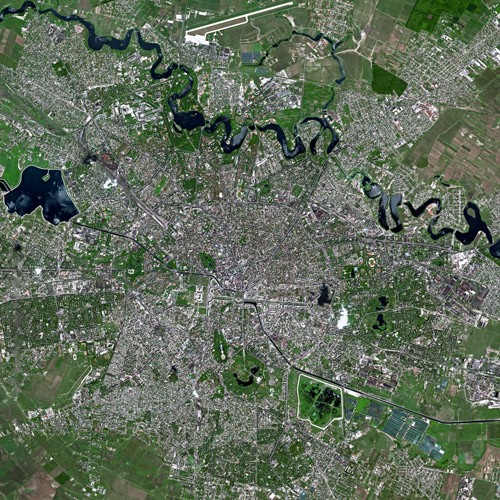
- Location within Bucharest, Romania
- Interactive map of Bucharest Botanical Garden
- Type: botanical garden
- Location: Bucharest, Romania
- Coordinates: 44°26′16.44″N 26°3′49.13″E
- Area: 18.2 hectares (45.0 acres)
- Elevation: 73 to 87 metres (240 to 285 ft)
- Established: 1860
- Founder: Carol Davila
- Designer: Dimitrie Brândză; Louis Fuchs
- Administrator: University of Bucharest
- Status: Open all year
- Plants: 10,000
- Public transit: Grozăvești metro station
- Website: gradina-botanica.unibuc.ro

The Bucharest Botanical Garden (Romanian: Grădina Botanică din București), now named after its founder, Dimitrie Brândză, is located in the Cotroceni neighbourhood of Bucharest, Romania. It has a surface of 18.2 hectares (45.0 acres), including 4,000 square metres (1 acre) of greenhouses, and has more than 10,000 species of plants.

The first botanical garden in Bucharest was founded in 1860 near the Faculty of Medicine by Carol Davila. The decree establishing the Botanical Garden was signed by Prince Alexandru Ioan Cuza on November 5 of that year. Its first director was the botanist Ulrich Hoffmann, followed six years later by Dimitrie Grecescu. The garden was eventually moved to its current location in 1884 by Dimitrie Brândză, a Romanian botanist, and Louis Fuchs, a Belgian landscape architect. The gardens were opened in 1891, when the building of the greenhouses finished. The garden was damaged during World War I, when it was used by the German occupation troops, and during World War II, when it was hit by Anglo-American bombardments.

In the Garden there is a Botanical Museum in a building of the Brâncovenesc style, located near the entrance gate, where more than 5,000 plant species are displayed, including 1,000 exotic plants.

The Old Greenhouse of the Botanical Garden was built between 1889 and 1891, along the lines of the Greenhouses of Liège, Belgium. In 1976 it was closed to the public, continuing to house only crop plants. The Pavilion was rehabilitated in 2011, being arranged as a tropical forest corner and containing species of several exotic plant families.

== Gallery ==
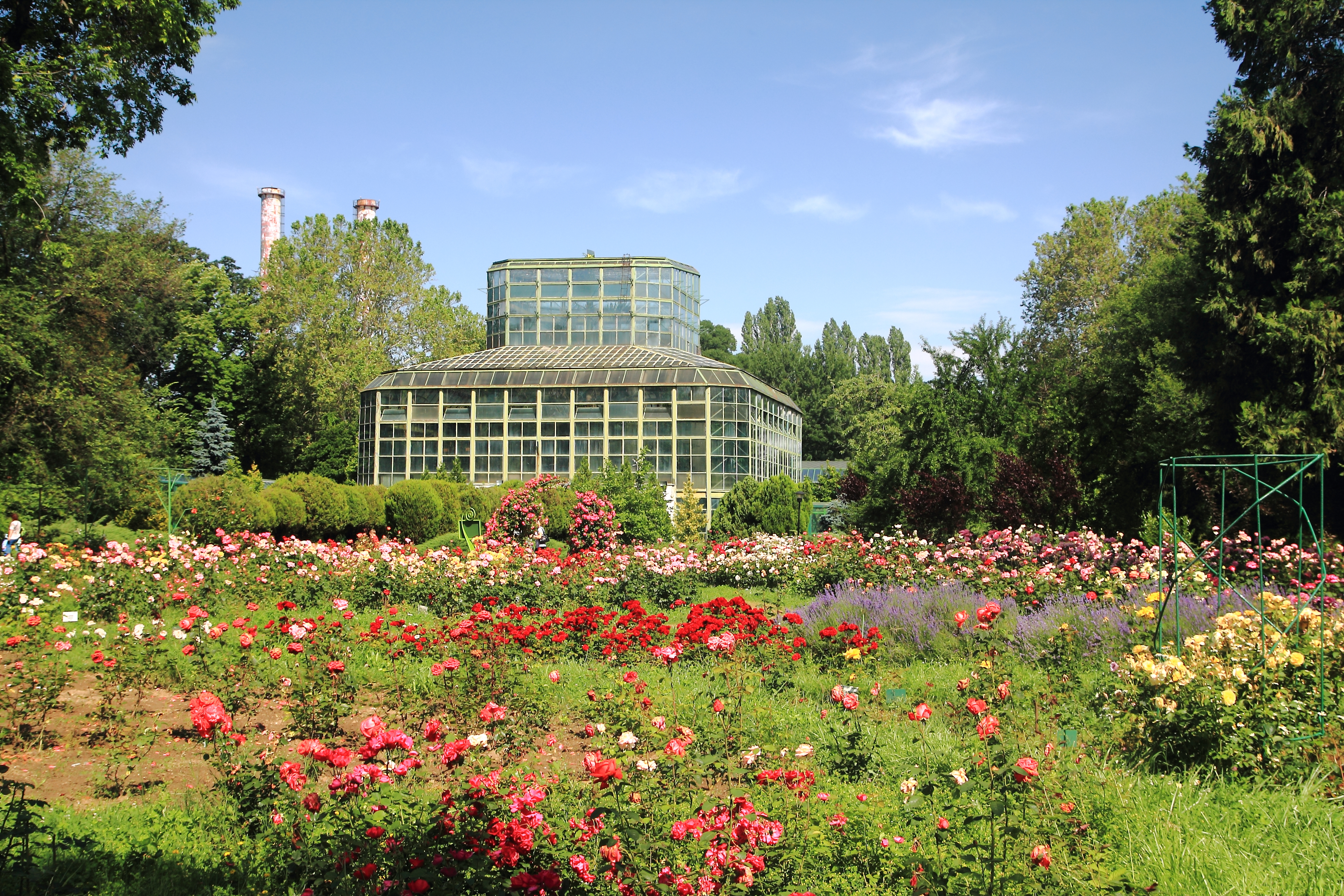

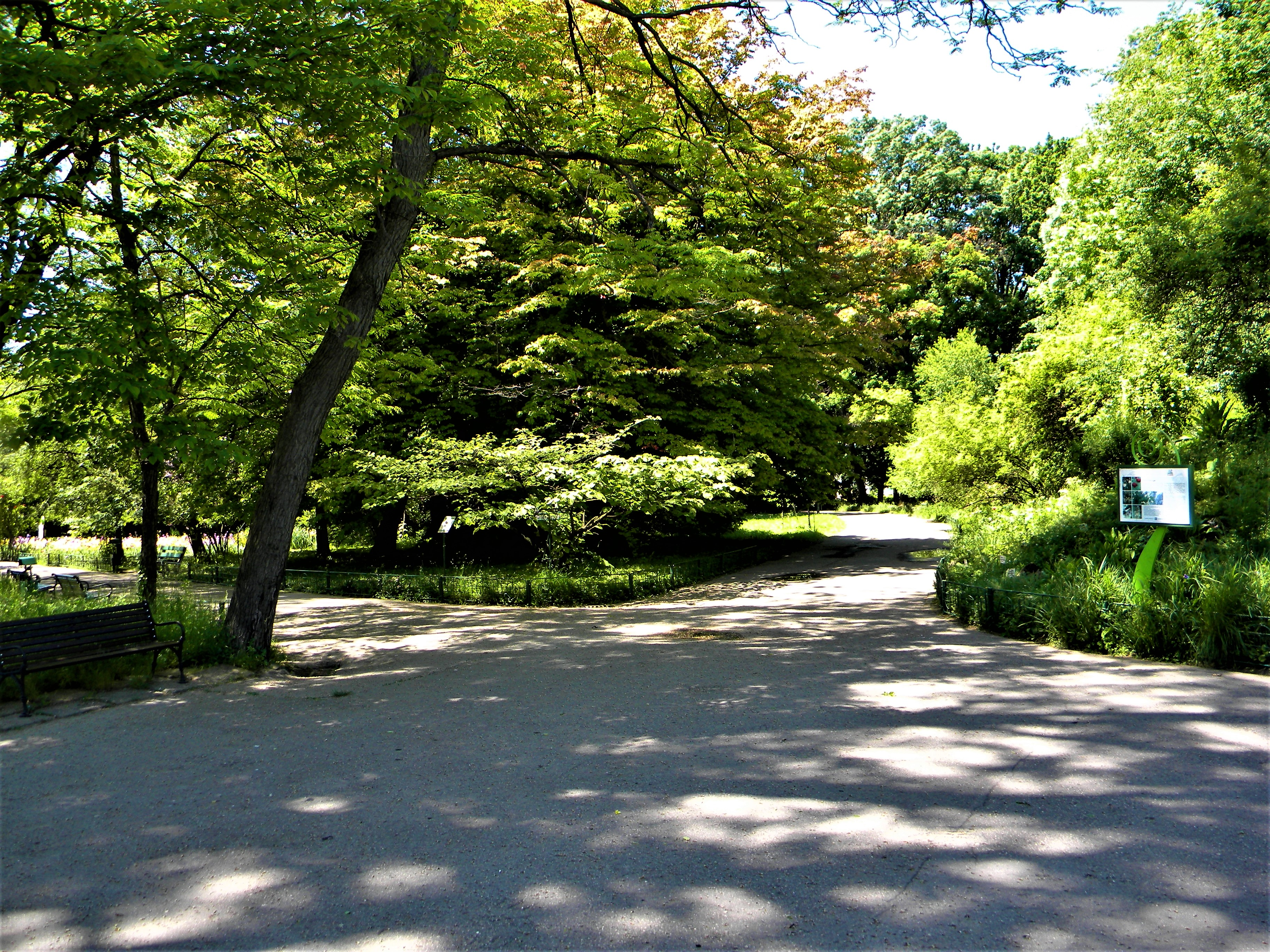

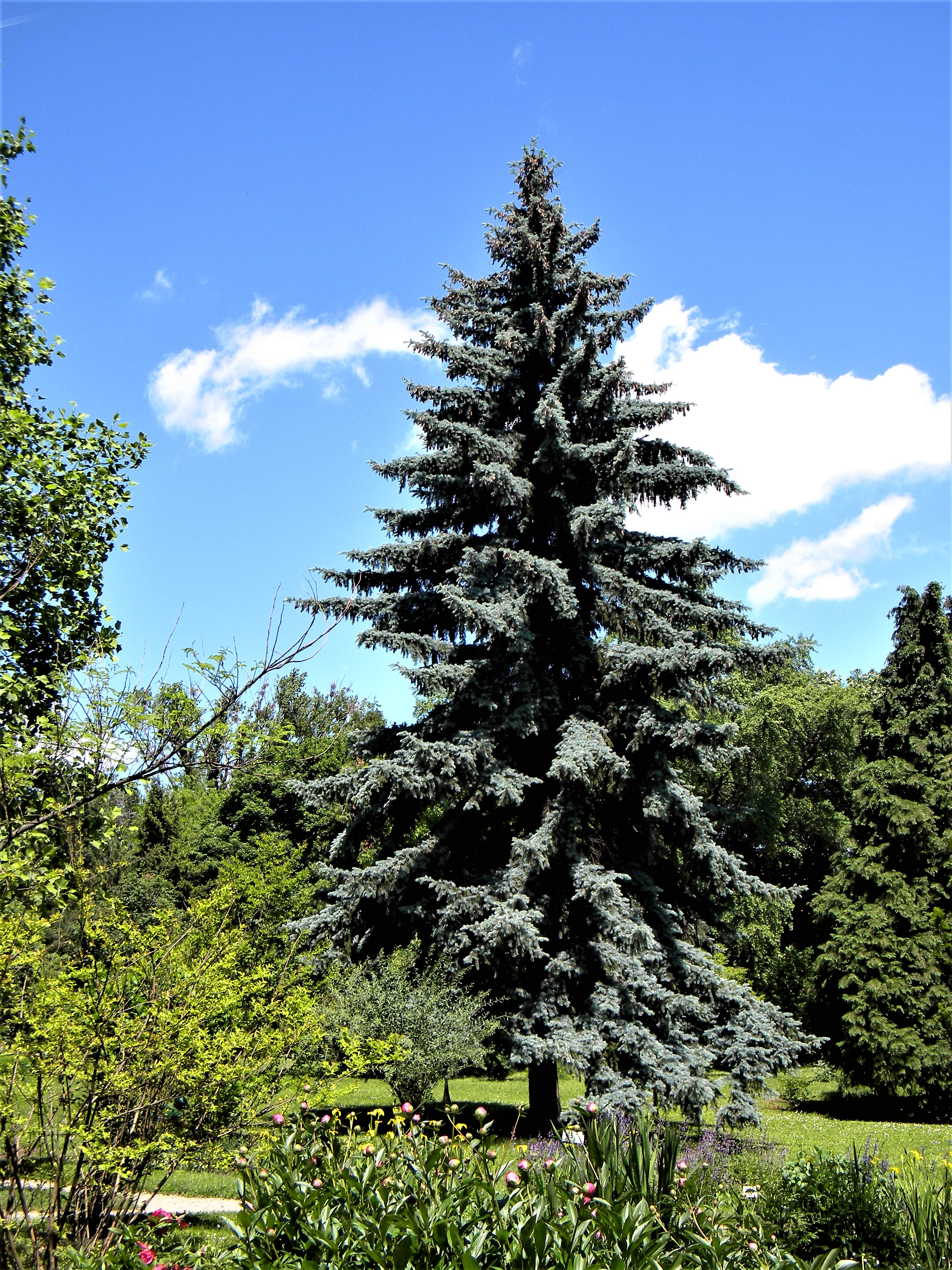

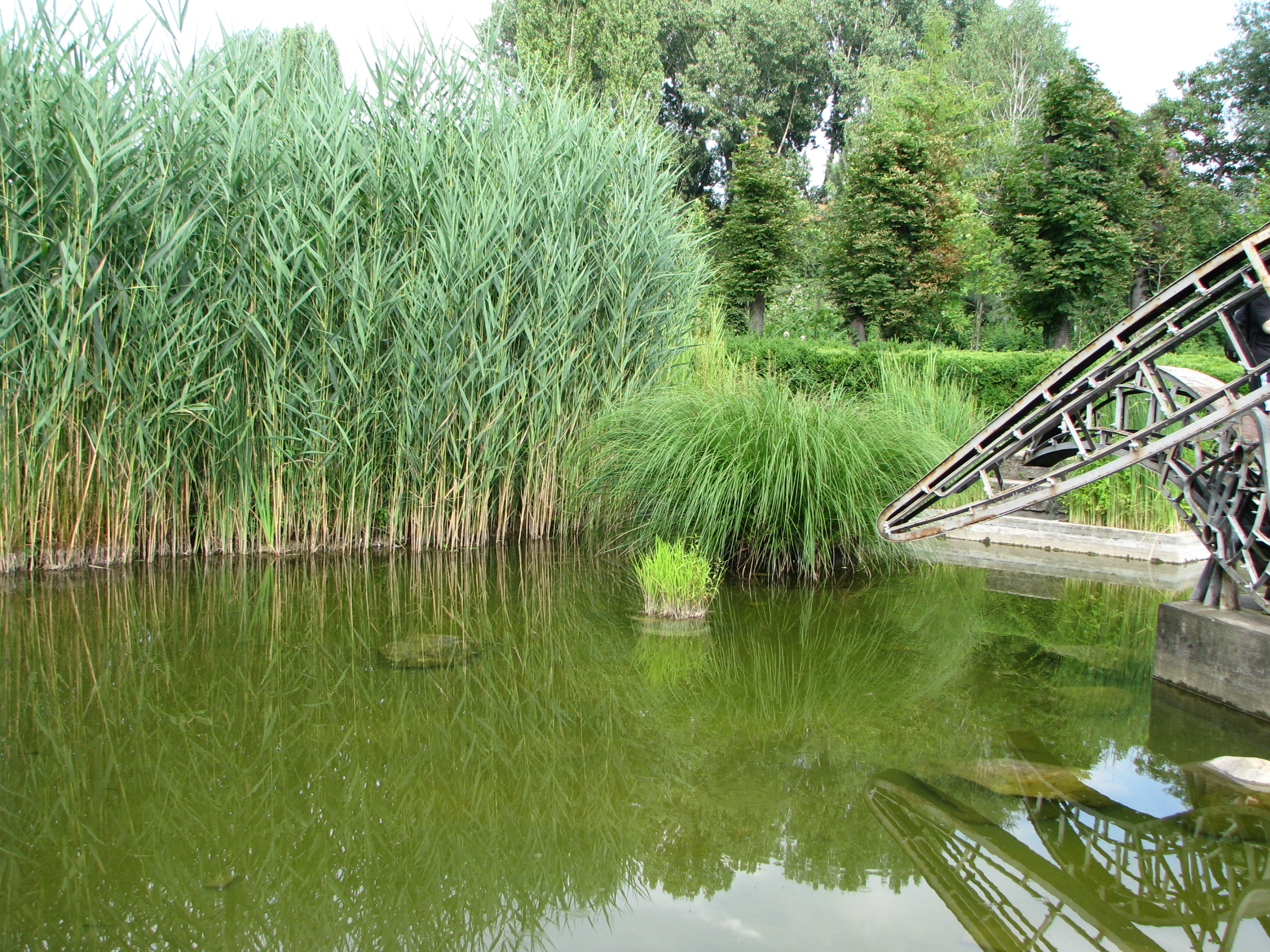
