= Misericordia Church, Timișoara =

Church building in Timișoara, Romania

Misericordia Church
- Biserica Mizericordienilor
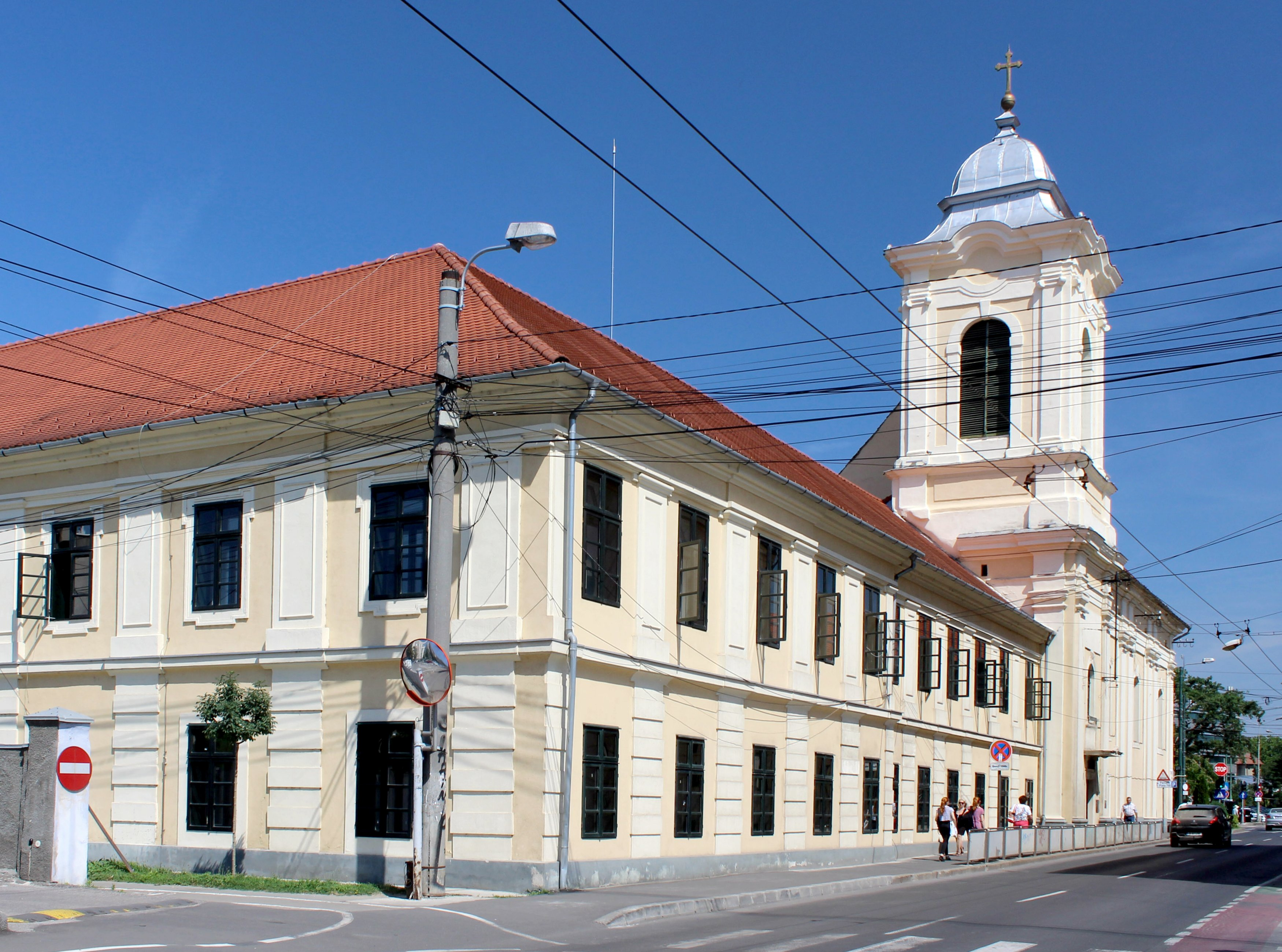

Religion
- Affiliation: Greek Catholic
- Ecclesiastical or organizational status: Romanian Greek Catholic Church
- Patron: Saint Joseph
- Year consecrated: 1757

Location
- Location: St. John Street, Timișoara
- Interactive map of Misericordia Church
- Coordinates: 45°45′20″N 21°13′28″E

Architecture
- Architect: Kaspar Dissel
- Style: Baroque
- General contractor: Johann Lechner
- Groundbreaking: 1748
- Completed: 1753
- Dome: 1

The Misericordia Church (Romanian: Biserica Mizericordienilor), also known as the Cetate Greek Catholic Church, is a Romanian Greek Catholic church located in Timișoara's 700 Square. Dedicated to Saint Joseph, the church belonged to the Brothers Hospitallers of Saint John of God (also known as "Merciful Brothers") and was built between 1748 and 1753. It is the second oldest church in Timișoara and houses the largest icon of St. Joseph in Romania as well as the oldest organ in Banat.

== History ==
Opposite today's 700 Square, the "Nepomuk brothers", a religious association in the city, built the city's first hospital and pharmacy in what was then Johannesgasse in 1735. Upon its completion in 1737, the mentioned association, represented by Count Andreas Hamilton, entrusted it to the Merciful Brothers. They were popularly called "black priests" and they took care of the sick, the elderly and the suffering. The first six friars arrived in Timișoara from Belgrade in 1737, under the leadership of Vicar Paulinus Temel. The church, attached to the hospital, was built between 1748 and 1753, on the site of the former chapel of the Order. It was designed by engineers Kaspar Dissel and Johann Lechner as a single-nave building with a semicircular vault in provincial Baroque style. In 1748, the church received a donation of 60,000 florins from Empress Maria Theresa. The said sum was donated for the completion of the works at the church and for the hospital. It was consecrated on 19 March 1757 by Bishop Franz Anton Engl von Wagrain.

On the night of 6 to 7 July 1849, during the siege of Timișoara by the Hungarian revolutionary troops, the church was hit by an artillery projectile, being largely destroyed. In 1851, the church was also rebuilt in the Baroque style.

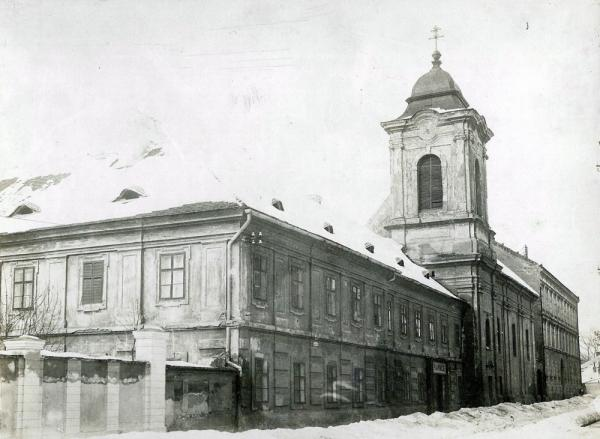
The monastic complex in the interwar period

In 1948, after the abolition of religious orders, the church was closed and used by the Museum of Banat as a depository of archeological pieces. After 1990, when the agreement for use was obtained from the rightful owners, the interior was renovated and arranged with the financial support of painter Alfons Vezoc, the works being executed by the team of engineer Ioan Pricop. The Roman Catholic Bishop of Timișoara Sebastian Kräuter and the representatives of the Order of the Misericordia decided in 1993 that the church should be donated to the Greek Catholics. The church was consecrated during the inaugural Holy Mass on 3 July 1993 by Ioan Ploscaru.

== Architecture ==
The church is part of a larger architectural complex with an F-shaped floor plan. Located to the south are a small transverse structure and a two-story corner building, both lower in height than the church itself. The former monastic complex now houses an eye clinic. Unusually, the church is not oriented to the east; instead, it follows a south-north axis, aligned with the adjacent street in the city center.

This Baroque, aisleless church features a gabled roof covered in red tiles. A small sacristy occupies the northwest corner, seamlessly integrated into the structure with a lean-to roof. The church exterior is plastered and painted yellow, with architectural elements such as pilasters, cornices, and jambs left unplastered to showcase the white natural stone. Pilasters divide the long facades and extend upward to a continuous, profiled cornice. Pointed arch windows further articulate the exterior—three on the east side and two on the south. The north side is solid, featuring only a small round-arched niche, above which are mounted a large cross and a round arch.

A square-plan tower on the south side serves as a transitional element between the church and the older parts of the complex. Fully enclosed by surrounding buildings except on the east, the tower projects slightly in that direction and aligns only with the church’s central axis. Above the church's eaves, the bell tower rises with corner pilasters and round-arched openings for the bells. It is topped by a curved dome adorned with a finial and a trefoil cross.
