= Dimitrie Grecescu =

Romanian botanist, physician and historiographer of science

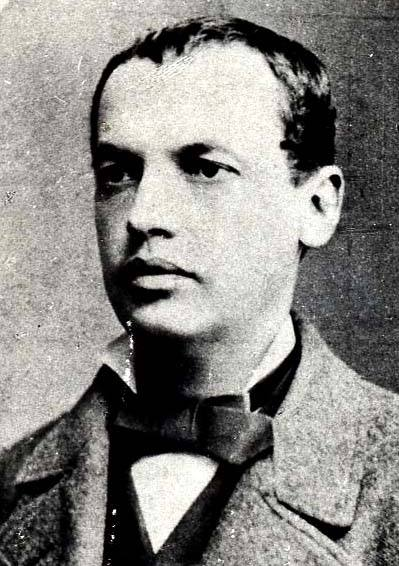
Dimitrie Grecescu

Dimitrie Grecescu (June 15, 1841 – October 2, 1910) was a Romanian botanist, physician and historiographer of science.

Born in Cerneți, Oltenia, in the Principality of Wallachia, he attended school in his native village and then in nearby Turnu Severin. He then studied at the National School of Medicine and Pharmacy in Bucharest from 1856 to 1863. With a recommendation from Carol Davila, Grecescu continued his studies in France, earning a doctorate in medicine and surgery from the University of Paris in 1868. His thesis, which dealt with the favid-causing Trichophyton fungi, was supervised by Charles-Philippe Robin. For the 1862–1863 school year, he was honorific professor of botany, physics and cosmography, and in 1867, following the death of Ulrich Hoffmann, he became substitute professor of botany at his Bucharest alma mater. He became director of the Bucharest Botanical Garden in 1866, serving until 1874. In 1868, he rose to full professor of medical botany. He taught pharmacy at the university level from 1869 to 1895, and was a professor at the University of Bucharest's medical faculty from 1876 to 1903. Elected a corresponding member of the Romanian Academy in 1898, he rose to titular status in 1907. He belonged to the Moscow Society of Naturalists, the Académie Internationale de Géographie Botanique in Paris and the Société nationale des sciences naturelles et mathématiques de Cherbourg. In 1878, he became a founding member of the Bucharest Society of Medical Sciences.

Grecescu was among the founders of research into floristics and phytogeography in Romania. He compiled a detailed inventory of Romania's flora, published in 1898 as Conspectul Florei României. The book includes 2450 species and 550 varieties, with precise details as to geographic range, growth conditions and popular names; the morpho-physiological descriptions are completed by pedoclimatic notes. In the same text, he introduced innovations into the de Candolle system, as well as now-obsolete contributions to botanical taxonomy. He intensively explored certain natural reservations in Romania, publishing books about flora and vegetation in the Bucegi Mountains (1869, 1876); the surroundings of Agapia, Văratec and Neamț monasteries (1879); the Gorj and Argeș Mountains (1895); the Suceava Massifs (1895); and the Ceahlău Massif (1906). He was also interested in the vegetation of Macedonia, in 1899 becoming the second Romanian to study the Balkans from a phytogeographical perspective.

He authored studies on the history of botany and on medical botany. As a thinker on biological phenomena, Grecescu was an adherent of the Pasteurian theory on the genesis of organisms, rejecting the notion of spontaneous generation. Regarding evolution, he was strongly influenced by the then-current ideas of Lamarckism and opposed to the creationist paradigm. As director of the botanical garden, he contributed to its organization and systematization along scientific lines, and also intensified exchanges with foreign colleagues. He put together two valuable herbaria, one for the flora of Romania and another covering Europe. Along with the building of the botanical institute, these were destroyed in the April 1944 bombing of Bucharest.

The standard author abbreviation Grecescu is used to indicate this person as the author when citing a botanical name.
