= Timișoara 700 Square =

Market square in Timișoara, Romania

- City square
- 700 Square
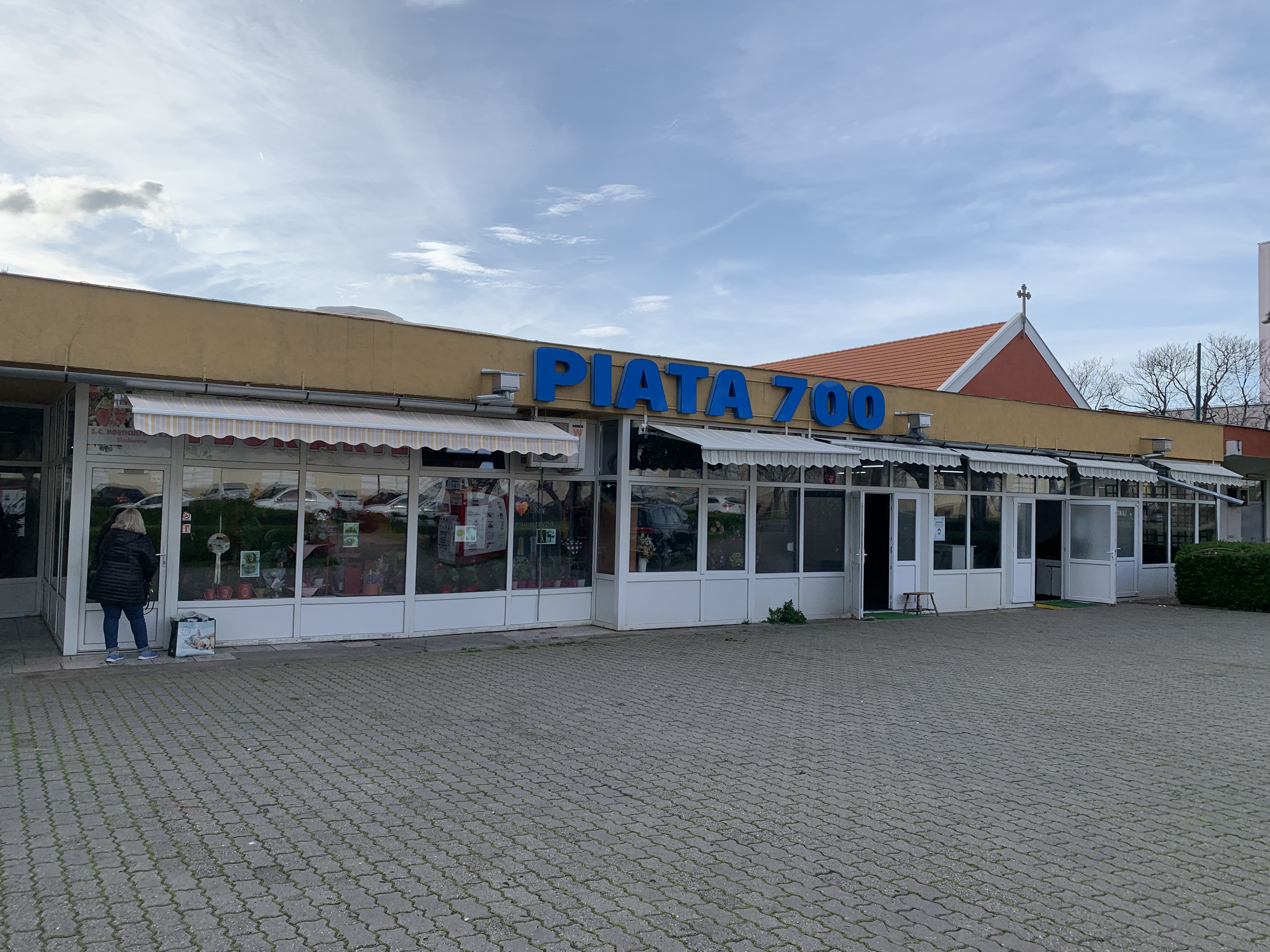
- Length: 392.17 m
- Owner: Timișoara City Hall
- Location: Timișoara, Romania
- Interactive map of Timișoara 700 Square
- Coordinates: 45°45′29.16″N 21°13′29.64″E

Timișoara 700 Square, colloquially 700 Square, is a square in Timișoara, Romania. It got its name in 1966, on the city's 700th anniversary; Timișoara's first documentary mention comes from 1266. Located on the western edge of the historic city, today the Cetate district, 700 Square overlaps the western side of the Palanca Mare district, the medieval suburb of Timișoara, and the fortifications of the Pagan-style fortress built in the 18th century.

== Outline ==
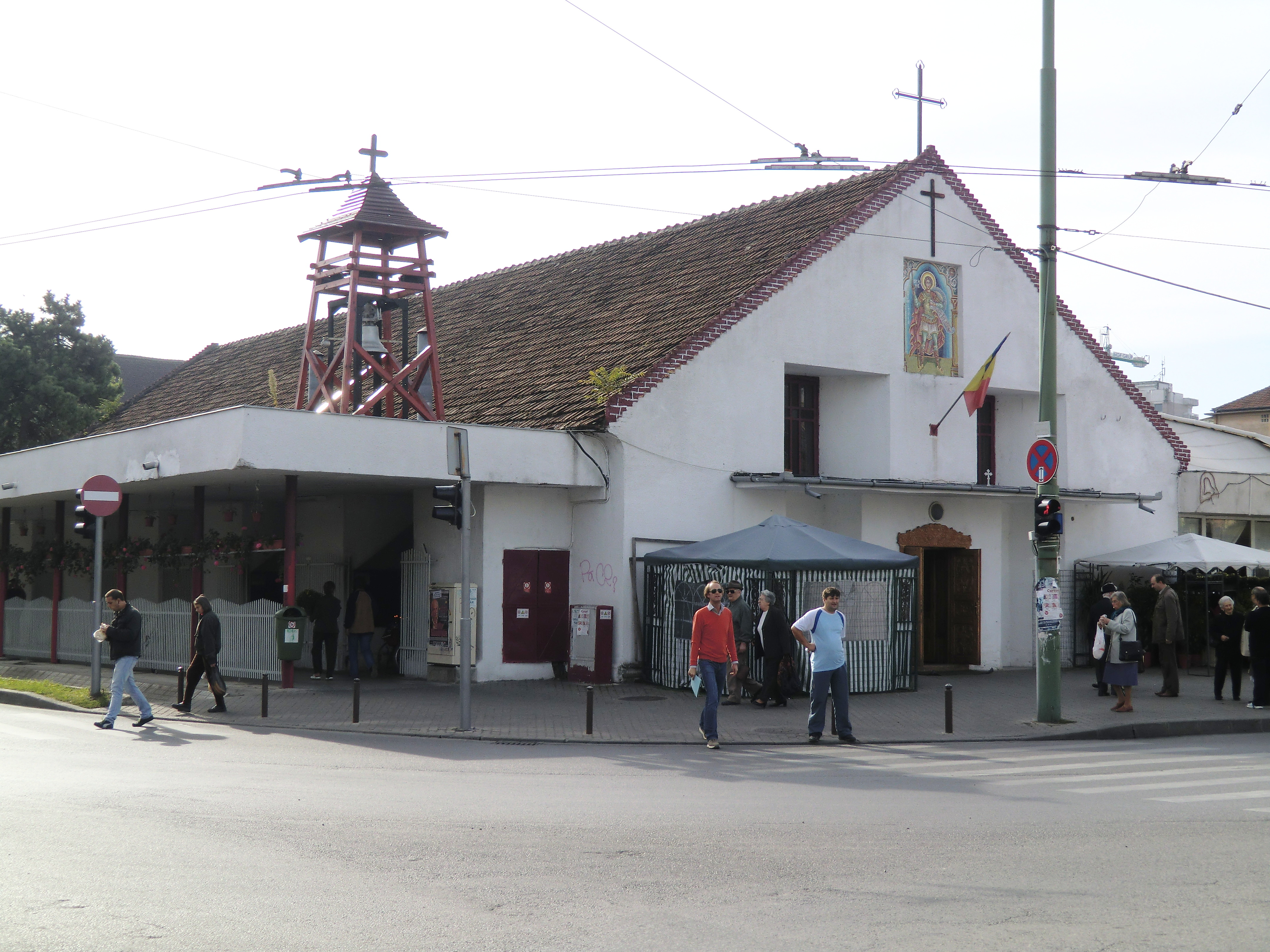
The Orthodox military chapel

The square houses a vegetable and a flower market and is surrounded by representative buildings. In a restored wing of the former fortress is the military chapel, first mentioned in 1801, which was re-consecrated in 2000 with the patron saint Demetrius of Thessaloniki. A space for cultural events has been set up in another restored casemate of the fortress.

To the north, modern buildings border the square, including the city's first data center (1970), the headquarters of the city's operator of public water and sewerage services Aquatim (2000) and the building of the West Regional Development Agency (2019), the institution dealing with the implementation of European funded projects. In 1994, the Adam Müller-Guttenbrunn House, the center of the German community in Banat, was opened to the east of the square.

On the south side is the building of the military hospital (1754), where an operation under anesthesia was performed for the first time in Banat in 1843. The old civilian hospital (1744), which today houses the clinic of oncology and dermatology, is also located here.

The west side of the square borders the clinic of ophthalmology, which is located in the former Franciscan convent. In front of the clinic, after 1990, a bronze statue was erected on a small green area to commemorate the victims of the Romanian Revolution. Next to the clinic is the Church of the Misericords (1748–1753), which was transferred from the Roman Catholic Church to the Greek Catholic Church after 1900.

== Archaeological discoveries ==
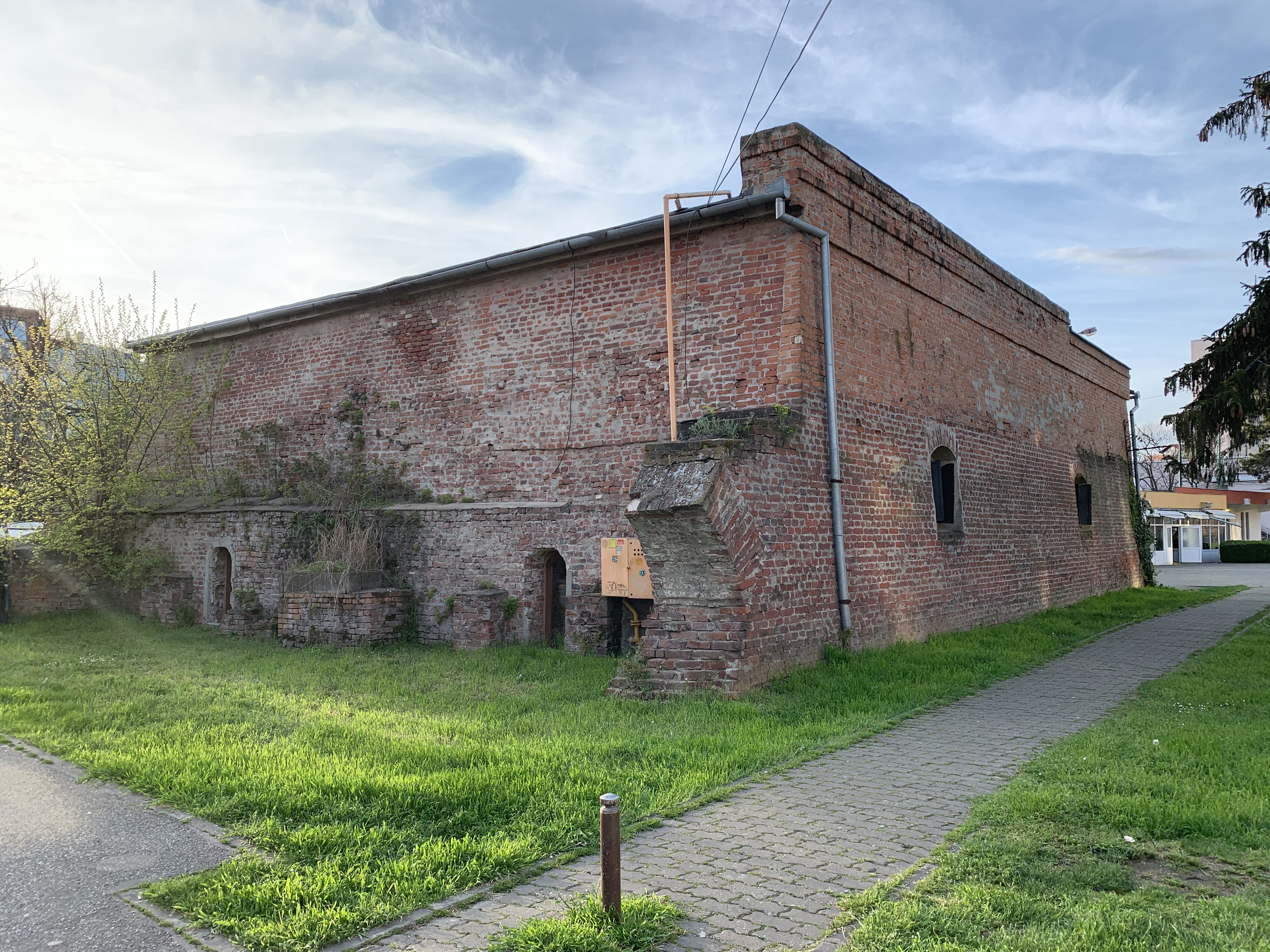
Fragment of the Eugene Bastion in 700 Square

In April 2013, following the excavations for the construction of a foundation of an office building, a series of remains were discovered, including a sluice built in the 18th century by the Habsburg administration, very well preserved, and used in the system of defense around the bastion. Between 2014 and 2015, the sluice was restored and transformed into an open-air museum.
