= Ion C. Brătianu Boulevard =

Boulevard in Timișoara, Romania

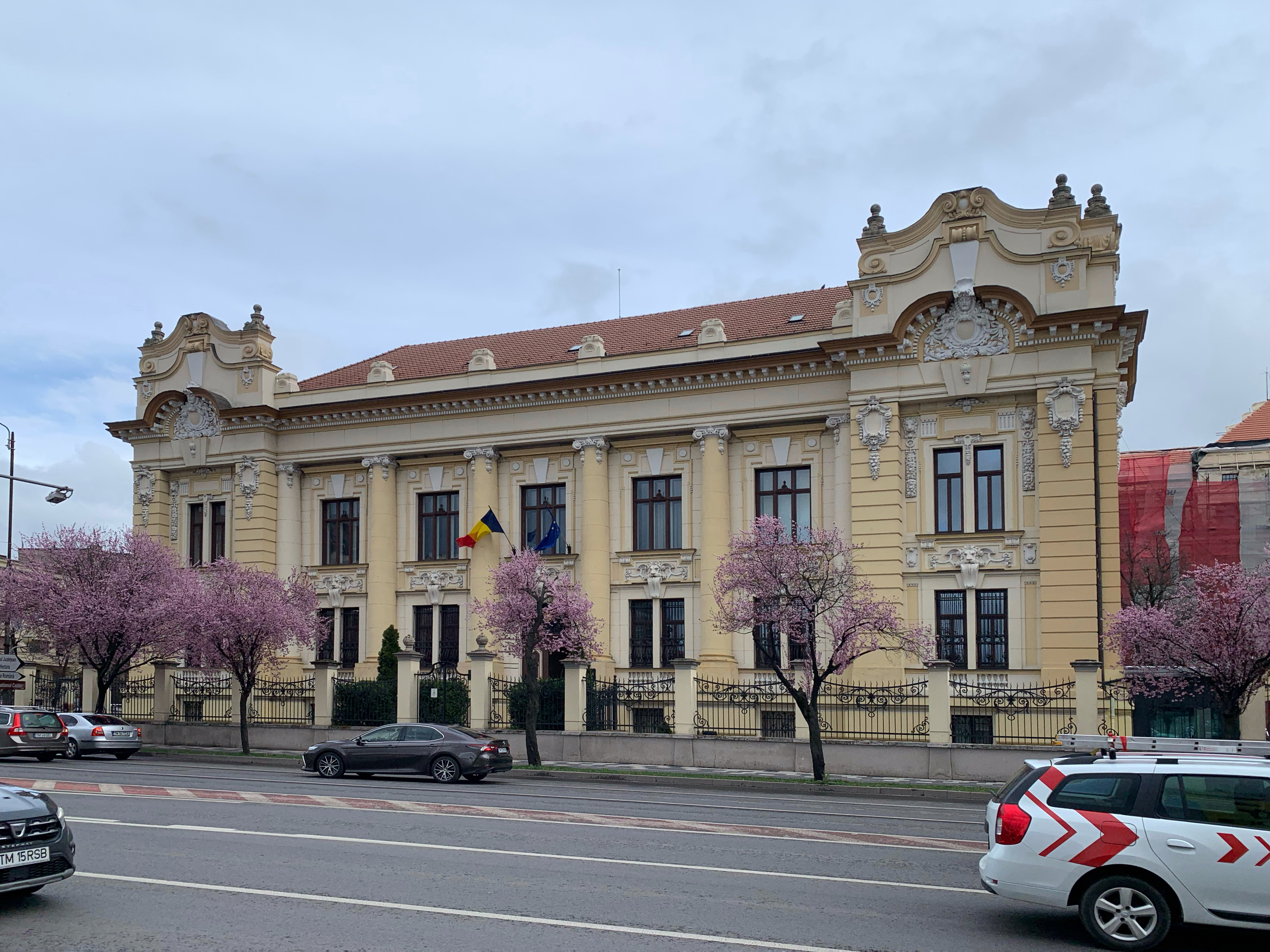
- The boulevard and the Palace of the National Bank
- Interactive map of Ion C. Brătianu Boulevard
- Native name: Bulevardul Ion C. Brătianu (Romanian)
- Maintained by: Timișoara City Hall
- Length: 244.9 m (803 ft)
- Location: Cetate, Timișoara, Romania
- Coordinates: 45.754284°N 21.233011°E
- From: Eugeniu Carada Square
- To: John Hunyadi Square

Ion C. Brătianu Boulevard (Romanian: Bulevardul Ion C. Brătianu) is a boulevard in Timișoara, Romania. Its origins trace back to the early 20th century, when it appeared as a modest alley aligned with the city's growing administrative and civic structures. As Timișoara expanded beyond its former fortress limits, the street gained importance and was elevated to boulevard status.

The boulevard showcases notable early 20th-century Secession-style architecture. A standout example is the Palace of the National Bank, designed by József Hubert between 1903 and 1904, which originally housed the Austro-Hungarian Bank.

At one end of the boulevard is a roundabout known as Ion I. C. Brătianu Square—previously called Dr. N. Russel Square and Nádor tér during the Austro-Hungarian period—featuring the distinctive Fountain of Cardinal Points at its center. Several streets converge here, including Hector, Martin Luther, Popa Șapcă, and Take Ionescu. Just behind the boulevard, Civic Park was created between 1968 and 1971 on the site of the old Transylvanian Barracks, developed alongside the construction of the Continental Hotel. The hotel (completed 1971, modernized in the early 2000s) offers various amenities and modernist architecture.

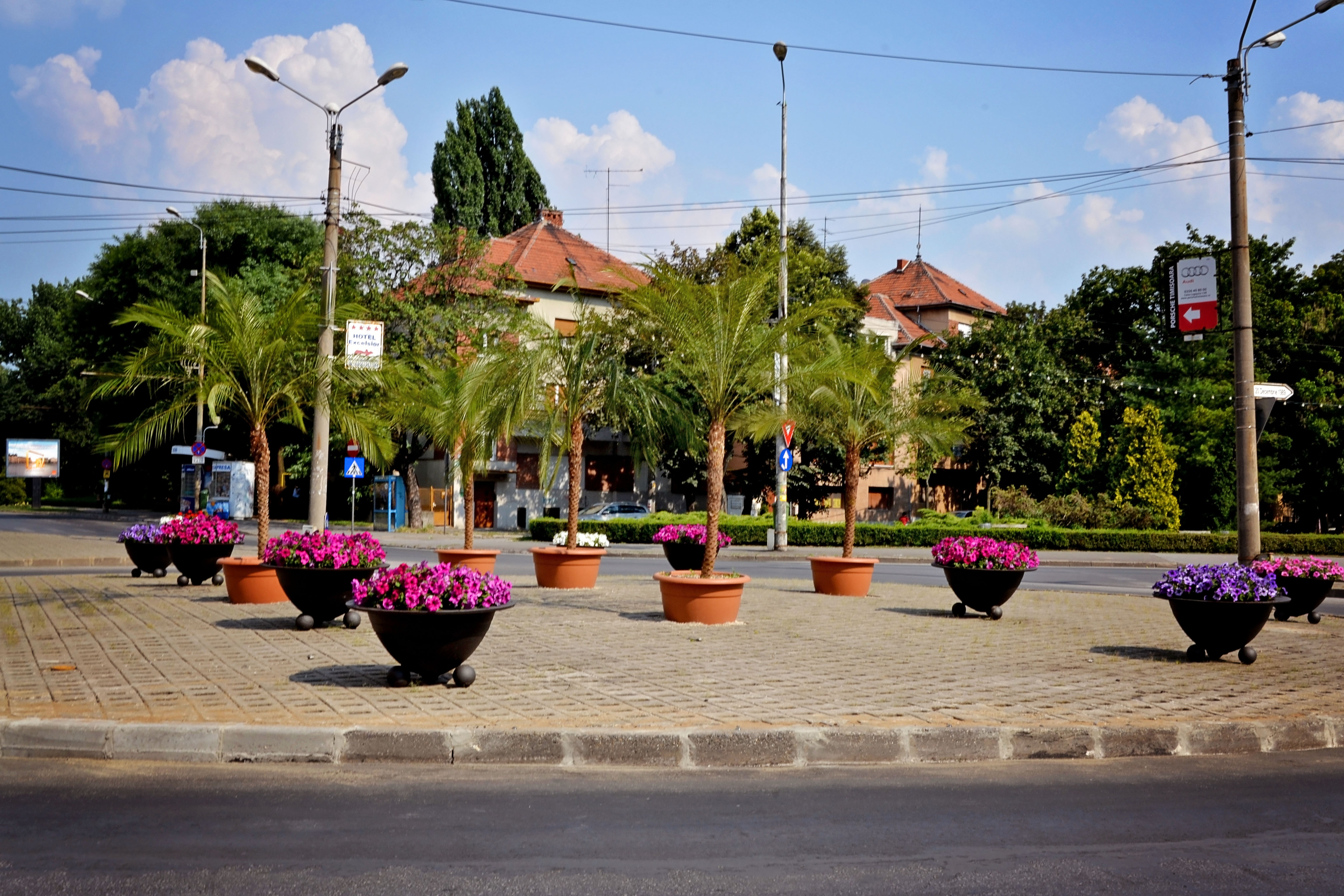
Palm trees in John Hunyadi Square

Between 2013 and 2019, during Mayor Nicolae Robu's administration, palm trees were planted along the boulevard—an unusual choice that led to Timișoara being mockingly nicknamed "Palmișoara."
