= 1989 Revolution Boulevard =

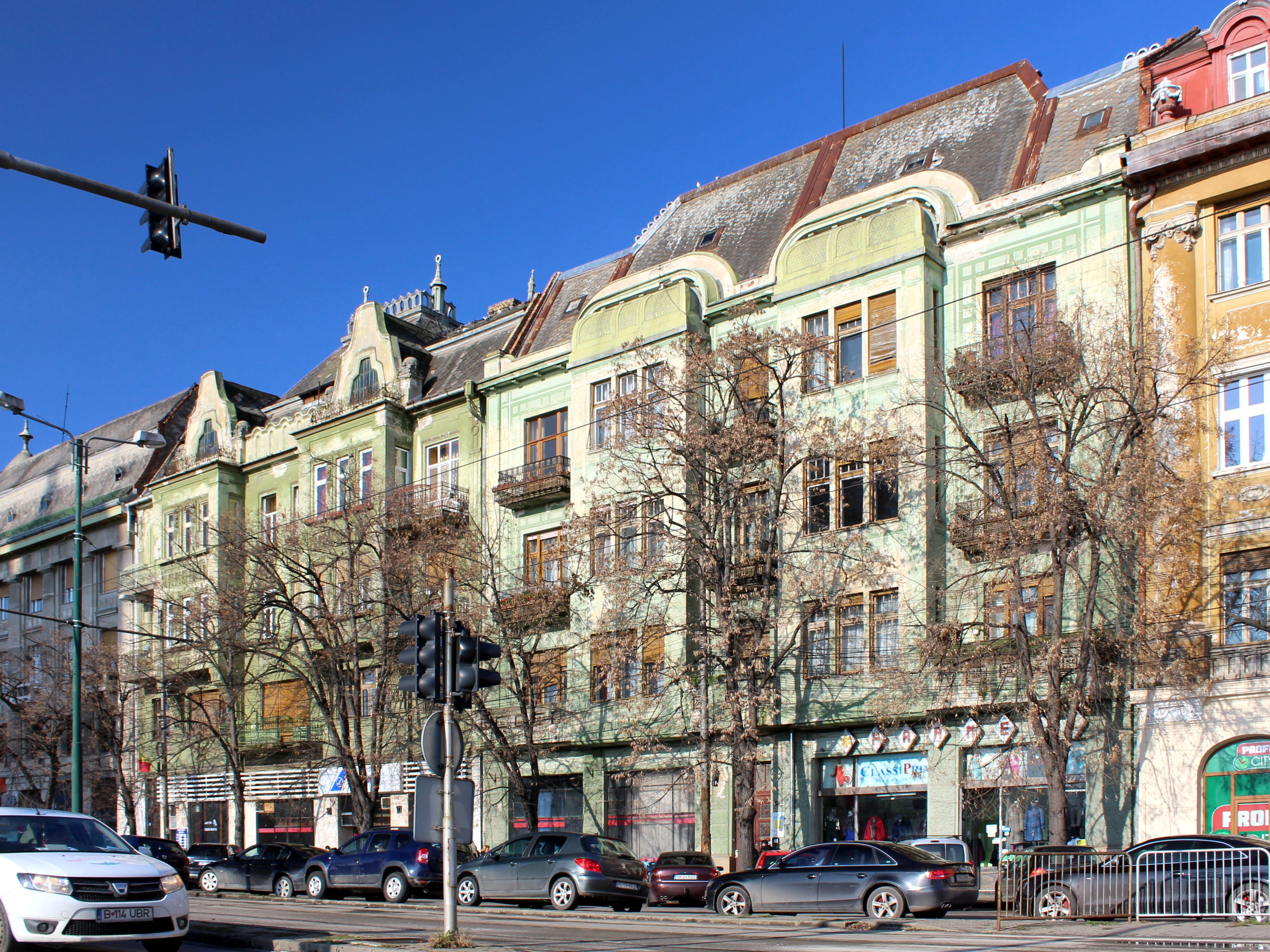
- 1989 Revolution Boulevard with the Klein and Gombos palaces
- Interactive map of 1989 Revolution Boulevard
- Native name: Revoluției din 1989 (Romanian)
- Former name: 23 August
- Maintained by: Timișoara City Hall
- Length: 729.37 m (2,392.9 ft)
- Location: Cetate, Timișoara, Romania
- Coordinates: 45°45′20″N 21°13′53″E
- From: Continental Hotel
- To: Decebalus Bridge

1989 Revolution Boulevard (Romanian: Bulevardul Revoluției din 1989) is a boulevard in Timișoara, Romania. In the past, it was also called 23 August Boulevard, Queen Marie Boulevard, and Liget út. It received its current name by Local Council Decision no. 260/1990.

== Architecture ==
Prominent along the boulevard are two groups of urban buildings designated as historical monuments. The first group consists of the Ciobanu, Gombos, Klein, and Banca Timișana palaces, showcasing a highly successful example of early 20th-century architecture (known as Secession) in Timișoara. Despite their varied stylistic expressions, all four palaces share cornices aligned at the same height. The second group includes the Post Office, the National Bank, the Institute of Medicine, and two student dormitories.

Directly opposite, at the site where the Transylvania Barracks once stood, rises the Continental Hotel—Timișoara's first tower building, inaugurated in 1971.
