= Transylvania Barracks =

- Cazarma Transilvania
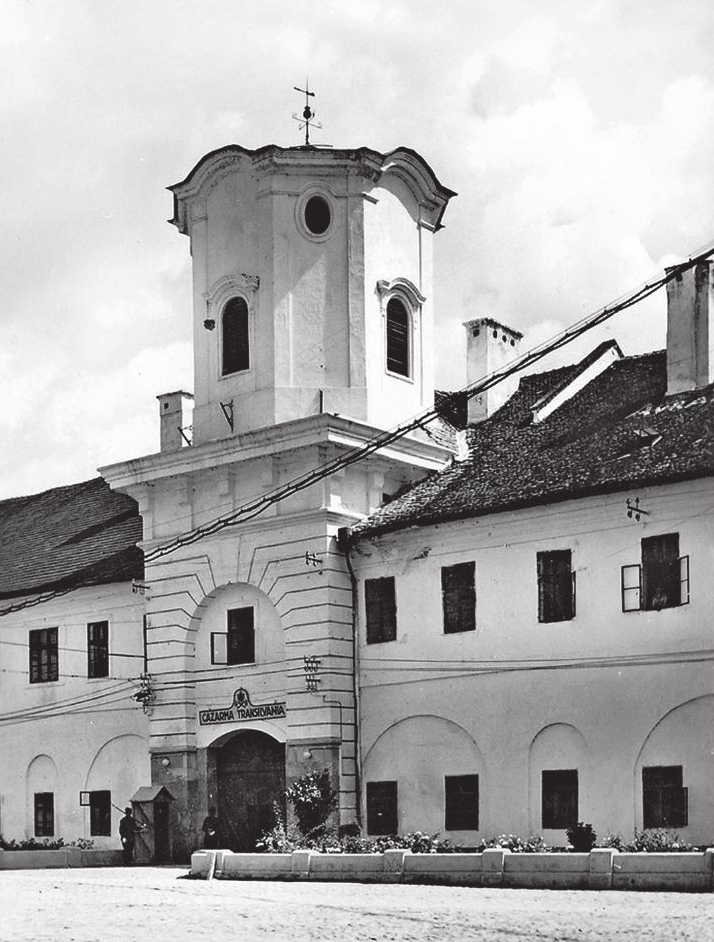
- Transylvania Barracks in the interwar period
- Interactive map of the Transylvania Barracks area

General information
- Status: Demolished
- Location: Timișoara, Romania
- Coordinates: 45°45′15″N 21°13′53″E
- Year built: 1719–1729
- Demolished: 1961–1965

Height
- Height: 20 m

Dimensions
- Other dimensions: 483 m in length

Design and construction
- Engineer: Nicolas Doxat (purportedly)

The Transylvania Barracks (Romanian: Cazarma Transilvania; German: Siebenbürger Kaserne; Hungarian: Erdélyi laktanya) were built between 1719 and 1729 by order of Count Claude Florimond de Mercy, commanding general of the Banat of Temeswar. At 483 meters long, they were the largest barracks in Timișoara and one of the longest buildings in Europe. They were demolished between 1961 and 1965, and the Civic Park was built in their place in 1971. Today, only a small part of the Transylvania Barracks remains, used by the National Theatre as a second stage.

== Name ==
The barracks were named after the Transylvania Gate, one of the entrance gates to the Timișoara Fortress, located nearby at the eastern end of the barracks. For comparison, the barracks near the Vienna Gate were referred to as the Vienna Barracks. Following the Austro-Hungarian Compromise of 1867 and the transfer of Banat to Hungarian administration, the complex became known as Erdélyi kaszárnya or Erdélyi laktanya. After the division of Banat in 1919 and its transfer to Romanian administration, the complex was renamed Cazarma Transilvania or Cazarma Ardeleană.

== History ==
The Transylvania Barracks were 483 meters long and consisted of a single floor. They formed an irregular arch, extending from the Joseph Bastion to the Hamilton Bastion of the old fortress. The building's layout featured eight corners, with only two of them forming right angles. The foundations of the medieval fortress walls were repurposed for the construction, which took place on the site of the fortress's old moats. This resulted in the building's distinctive, curved shape. The simple structure was topped with a series of double windows and relief arches on the ground floor. The gate tower, designed in 1727 and completed the following year, stood 20 meters tall in the center of the complex. It was built in an octagonal shape on a square base, adorned with a Baroque cornice, and featured four oval windows beneath it. The barracks housed living quarters across two floors, accommodating ten companies with their officers, not including the general and minor staff. The infantry used the vaulted rooms as stables, wagon sheds, or cellars, and a significant portion of these spaces were converted into prisons for both military and provincial civilian prisoners.

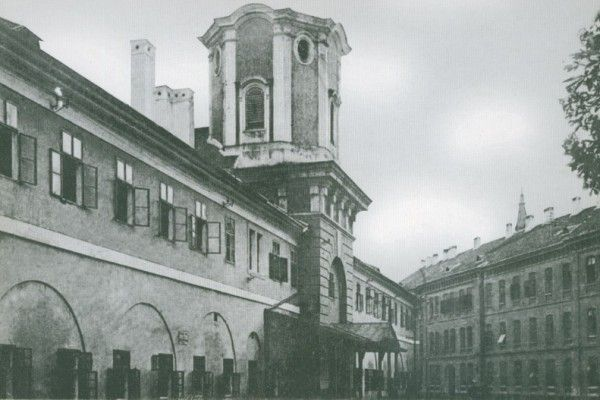
The barracks complex in 1905

The Transylvania Barracks were constructed to function as a fortress wall in the southeast and as a bastion in the northeast. The Bega River once flowed through the barracks courtyard, where the fortress port had been located in the 18th century, until the river was rerouted further south, the canal was covered, and the pier dismantled. The gate tower faced St. George Square, and from its summit, one could view the entire Timișoara Fortress, extending beyond its walls, allowing the guards on duty to spot and signal any external threats.

=== Demolition ===
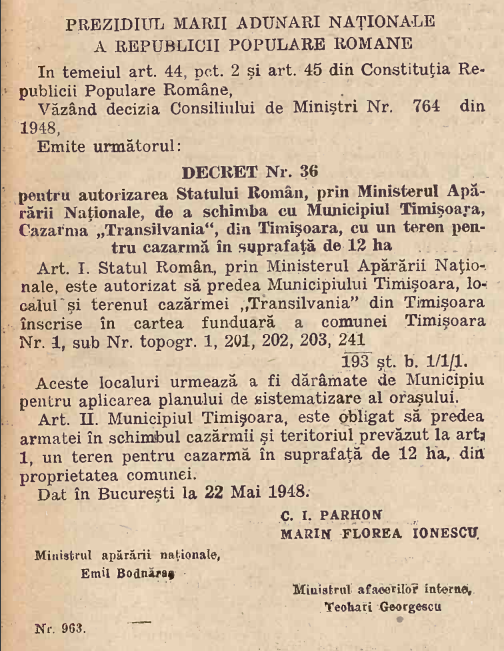
Decree No. 36 of 22 May 1948, published in the Official Gazette No. 116 of 24 May 1948

Following the defortification of the Timișoara Fortress at the end of the 19th century and the beginning of the 20th century, the city aimed for modern urban development. In the 1930s, the city hall sought to purchase the barracks with the intention of demolishing it to make way for further modernization.

The Transylvania Barracks were transferred to the city hall by the Ministry of National Defense for demolition in order to facilitate the city's urban planning, through Decree No. 36 on 22 May 1948. The decree was signed by Constantin Ion Parhon, president of the Presidium of the Great National Assembly, along with Marin Florea Ionescu, Emil Bodnăraș, and Teohari Georgescu. The decommissioning and demolition process began in 1956, with the land surrounding the barracks being enclosed by a wire fence until 1958. The actual demolition took place between 1961 and 1965. Due to the building's thick walls, designed to withstand sieges, the demolition proved challenging, with authorities at the time prohibiting the use of dynamite. The bricks from the demolition were carefully cleaned and stored for future reuse, following a similar approach to the defortification of the fortress.

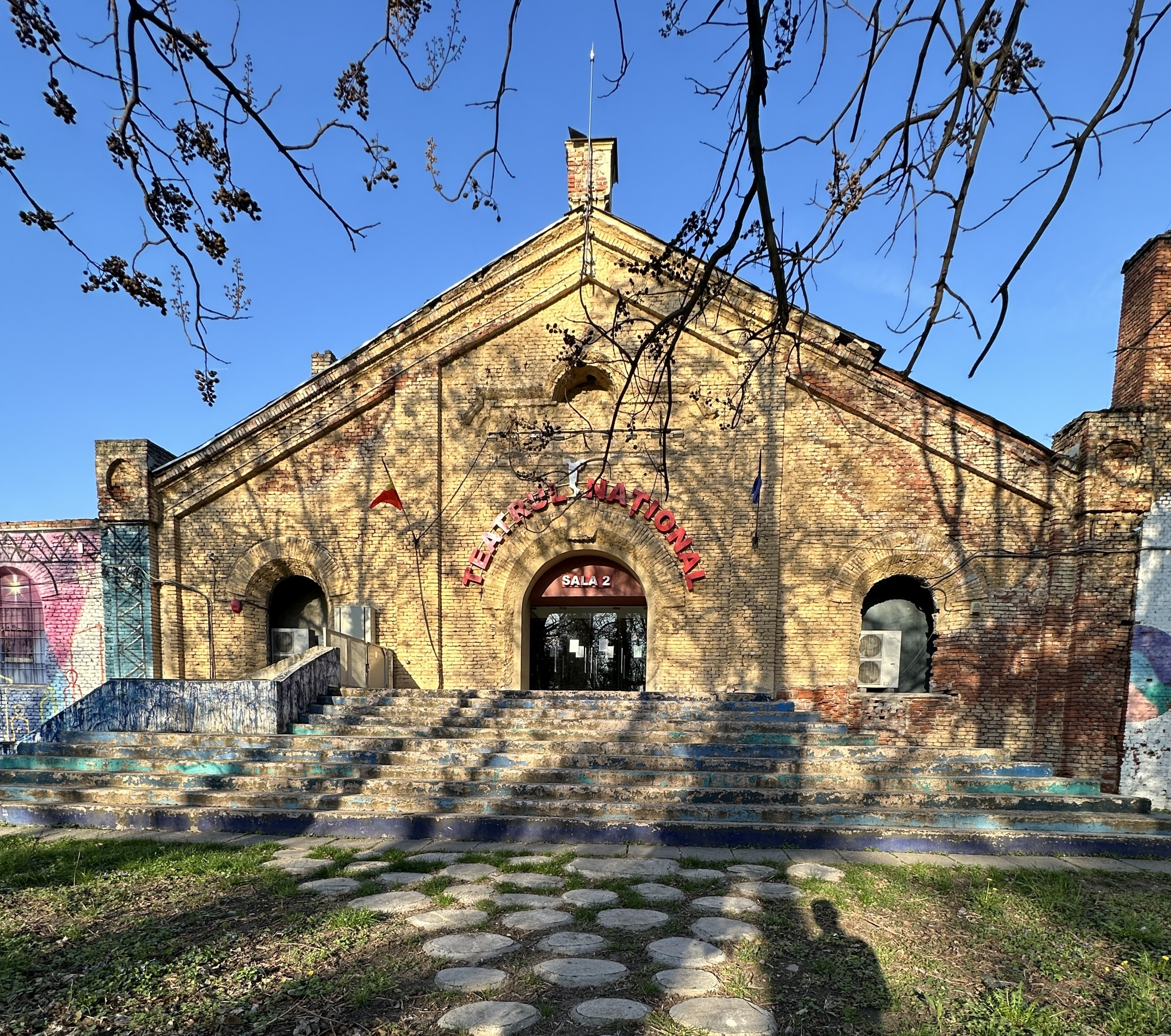
Hall 2

The demolition was intended to make way for the construction of a new civic center. Several buildings were scheduled for demolition as part of the project, including two-thirds of the Theresia Bastion, the Szana Palace, the Ion I. C. Brătianu Technical College building, the Faculty of Industrial Chemistry and Environmental Engineering building, the St. Catherine Church, and dozens of villas built during the interwar period along Mihai Eminescu and Constantin Diaconovici Loga boulevards. Plans included the construction of four 10-story apartment blocks near Hunyadi Castle, opposite the Emanuil Ungureanu Technical College. A few years earlier, the Mocioni Palace had also been demolished, and the Bega Shopping Center now stands in its place.

The construction of the civic center did not come to fruition, and today, the site of the former barracks is home to Civic Park, the Continental Hotel (1971), and the Floral Clock (1970). A small remnant of the old building remains—the former officers' riding school, known as Hall 2. Until 2009, it functioned as a sports hall before being converted into an auditorium, which is now part of the Mihai Eminescu National Theatre.
