= Hungarian House, Timișoara =

Hungarian House
- Magyar Ház
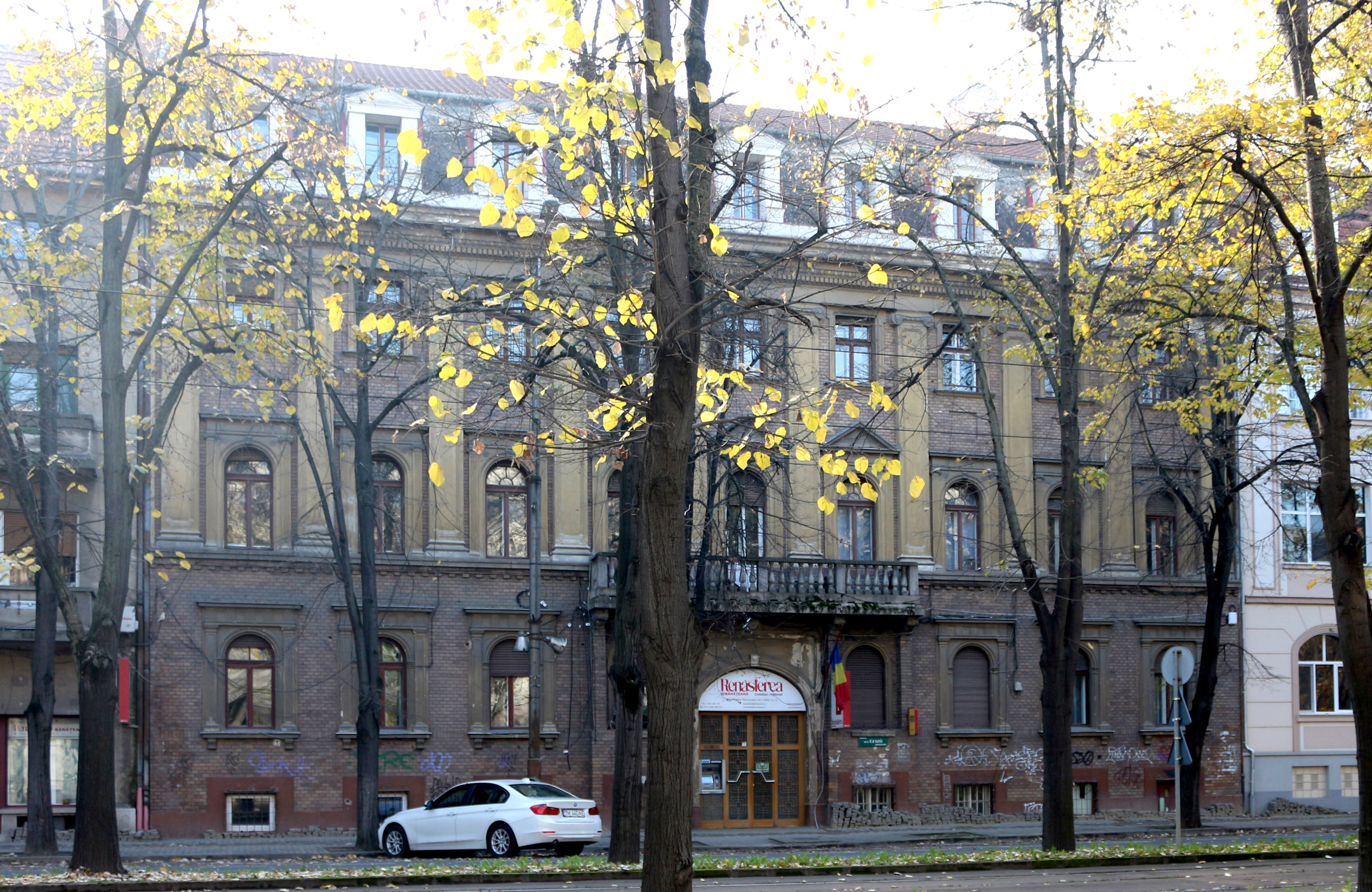
- Interactive map of the Hungarian House area

General information
- Location: 8 1989 Revolution Boulevard, Timișoara, Romania
- Coordinates: 45.7553721°N 21.2359631°E
- Construction started: 1929
- Completed: 1930
- Owner: Bastion Association

Technical details
- Floor count: 3

Design and construction
- Architect: László Székely

The Hungarian House (Hungarian: Magyar Ház; Romanian: Casa Maghiară) is a historical building in Timișoara, Romania. The Honorary Consulate of Hungary, the Bastion Association, the Diaspora Foundation, and the Hungarian Youth Organization operate here. It hosts various monthly events such as literary circle, improvisational theater evening, community building events, wine tastings, and game nights.

== History ==
This was the final building designed by László Székely, the chief architect of Timișoara, constructed between 1929 and 1930 with donations from the Hungarian community of Timișoara and the Banat region. A document was placed in the building's foundation bearing the inscription: "We dedicate this house to Hungarian culture, which was built in the hardest times, through the sacrifice of the Hungarians of Banat." The building went on to host several local Hungarian institutions, including the Hungarian Singing Association of Timișoara, the Hungarian Cultural Association of Banat, the János Arany Literary Society, and, for a time, the Hungarian library.

During World War II, the building served as a military hospital. After the war, it was taken over by the Hungarian People's Union of Timișoara, which remained active until 1953. It was then transferred to the Communist Party, becoming the headquarters of the PCR City Committee from 1953 to 1968. When the City Committee relocated to the city hall, the building became home to the party newspapers Drapelul Roșu, Szabad Szó, as well as German and Serbian-language publications. For a time, the Facla Publishing House also operated from this location. Until 2022, the basement accommodated the printing facilities for the newspapers Renașterea Bănățeană and Új Szó. In the early 1990s, the building was taken over by Timpress SA, the publishing company behind Renașterea Bănățeană, which was owned by billionaire Iosif Constantin Drăgan.

In recent decades, members of Timișoara's Hungarian community initiated several legal actions to reclaim the Hungarian House, but all claims were ultimately unsuccessful. The building eventually came into the ownership of brothers Emil and Marius Cristescu, who planned to convert it into a hotel. After lengthy negotiations, the Cristescu brothers sold the building to the Bastion Association (Hungarian: Várbástya Egyesület) in 2022 for €2.3 million. To facilitate the acquisition, the Association secured €3 million in funding from the Hungarian government. The building was subsequently restored, redeveloped, and restructured to function as a cultural space for the community.

In 2024, the Bolyai–Székely Memorial Hall was opened here, honoring the lives and legacies of architect László Székely (1877–1934) and mathematician János Bolyai (1802–1860). That same year, a grocery store, café, and bookstore offering "Hungarikum" products—an official trademark recognized by the Hungarian Ministry of Agriculture—was opened. The establishment is named after Baron Andor Ambrózy, a prominent Timișoara figure who financially supported the construction of the Hungarian House.
