= List of palaces and mansions in Budapest =

This is a list of palaces and mansions in Budapest, Hungary.

== List of palaces and mansions in Budapest ==
Name	Location	Established	Architect	Style	Family	Picture	Present function
Andrássy Palace							
Royal Palace of Buda	District I	14th century	Jean Nicolas Jadot; Miklós Ybl; Alajos Hauszmann	Romanesque; Renaissance; Baroque	King of Hungary		Museum
De la Motte–Beer Palace							
Drechsler Palace							
Danube Palace							
Festetics Palace							
Foncière Palace							
Gresham Palace							
Károlyi Palace							
Klotild Palaces							
Chainbridge Palace							
New York Palace							
Péterffy Palace							
Archiepiscopal Palace							
Sándor Palace							
Stefánia Palace							
Wenckheim Palace							
Ybl Palace							
Budai Vigadó							
Pesti Vigadó							
Nagytétényi Palace							
Czuba-Durozier Palace							
Gizella Palace							
Kiscelli Schmidt Mansion							
Klebelsberg Mansion							
Nyéki Hunting Lodge							
Podmaniczky–Vigyázó Mansion							
Sacelláry Mansion							
Száraz-Rudnyánszky Mansion							
Törley Mansion							
Zichy Mansion							
Palace of Wonders							
Deák Palace							
Merkúr Palace							
Müpa							
Police Palace							
Karátsonyi-palota							
József főhercegi Palace							
Mocsonyi Palace	Teréz körút 2-4	1874	Donát Voita	Eclecticism	Mocioni family		
Mocsonyi Palace	Vörösmarty tér 2	1874	Mór Kallina		Mocioni family		
Wenckheim Palace	Szabó Ervin tér 1						Fővárosi Szabó Ervin Könyvtár központi épülete.
Pálffy Palace	Reviczky u. 2						Fővárosi Szabó Ervin Könyvtár Zenei Gyűjteménye.
Pejacsevich Palace	Reviczky u. 3	1893-1896; Elek Hofhauser					
Wenckheim	Reviczky u. 4	1889; György Dániel					Fővárosi Szabó Ervin Könyvtár központi épülete.
Bánffy	Reviczky u. 5	1873	Miklós Bánffy				(1873, Bánffy Miklós?), ma az Országos Rádió és Televízió Testület (ORTT) székháza.
Festetics	Pollack Mihály tér 3	1862	Miklós Ybl				Andrássy Gyula Budapesti Németnyelvű Egyetem.
Esterházy Palace	Pollack Mihály tér 8	1865	Sándor Baumgarten				1946-1948 residence of the President of Hungary, now the Marble Hall of the Magyar Rádió
Károlyi Palace	Pollack Mihály tér 10	1863-1865	Miklós Ybl				
Fechtig Palace	Bródy Sándor u. 2	1863-1865	Antal Skalnitzky				
Dessewffy Palace	Bródy Sándor u. 4	1875-1876	Antal Weber				
Keszlerffy Palace	Bródy Sándor u. 6	1897	József Huber				
Régi képviselőház	Bródy Sándor u. 8	1865	Miklós Ybl				Budapesti Olasz Kultúrintézet működik itt.
Keglevich-palota	Bródy Sándor u. 9	1871	Ferenc Dötzer				
Tauffer Palace	Bródy Sándor u. 10	1892	Ernő Schannen				
Gschwindt Palace	Bródy Sándor u. 12	1901	Sándor P. Tóth				
Odescalchi Palace	Bródy Sándor 14	1872-1874	Miklós Ybl				
Kéményseprő-ház	Bródy Sándor 15	1851-1855	Károly Hild				
Törley Palace	Bródy Sándor 16	1893-1895	Rezső Ray				
Hadik–Barkóczy Palace	Múzeum u. 5	1896	Endre Lux				
Hasenfeld House or Hadik Palace	Múzeum u. 7	1875 (rebuilt 1912)	János Kauser (rebuilt by István Möller)				TIT Kossuth Klub Egyesület
Bókay Palace	Múzeum u. 9	1870	Miklós Ybl				
Károlyi Palace	Múzeum u. 11	1869-1871	Antal Skalnitzky; József Pucher				MÁV Symphonic Orchestra (property of MÁV)
Zichy Palace	Múzeum u. 15	1871	Antal Skalnitzky				
Károlyi-Csekonics Palace	Múzeum u. 17	1881	Ignác Wechselmann				
Almásy Palace	Ötpacsirta u. 2	1877	Antal Gottgeb				Építőművészek Székháza.
Pulszky Palace	Trefort u. 1	1890	Arnold Nefanei				
Prónay Palace	Trefort u. 2	1890	Lóránt Fridrich				Hotel
Hunyady Palace	Trefort u. 3	1892	Artur Meinig				Józsefvárosi Eü. Szolgálat
Szentkirályi Palace	Szentkirályi u. 10	1894-1897	Ernő F. Zobel				
Zichy Palace	Lőrinc pap tér 2	1897	Lipót Havel				
Darányi Palace	Lőrinc pap tér 3	1896	Sándor Stark				
Kauser House	Gyulai Pál u. 5	1860	Károly Gerster				
Gottgeb Antal Mansion	Gyulai Pál u. 13	1870	Antal Gottgeb				

== See also ==
- List of palaces and mansions in Hungary
- List of castles in Hungary
