= Vienna Barracks, Timișoara =

Vienna Barracks
- Cazarma Vienei
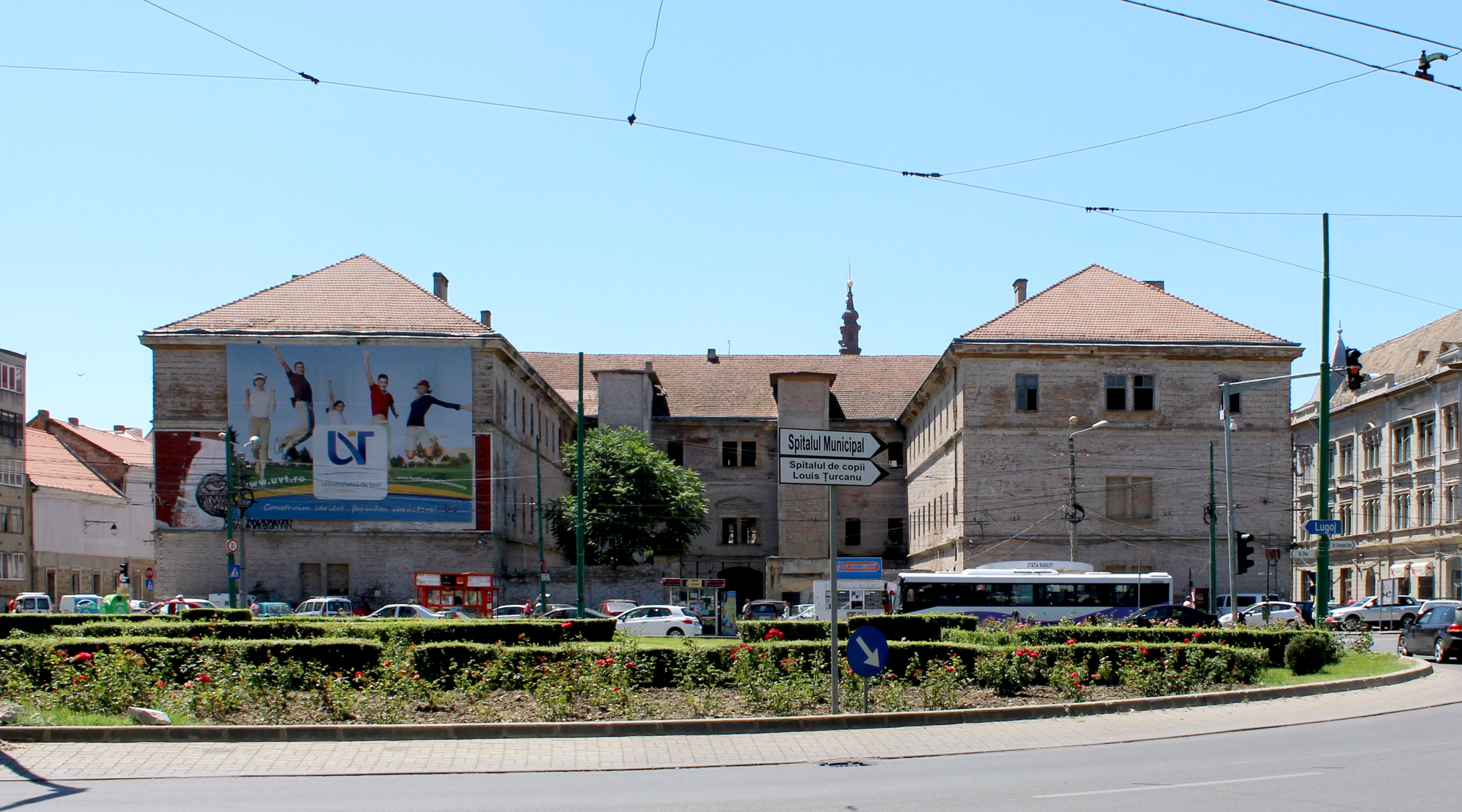
- Former names: Franz Joseph Barracks
- Alternative names: U Barracks

General information
- Status: Ruined
- Architectural style: Austrian Baroque
- Location: 2 Mărăști Square; Timișoara; Romania
- Coordinates: 45°45′31″N 21°13′39″E
- Completed: 1752
- Renovated: After 1849

Technical details
- Floor count: 3

The Vienna Barracks (Romanian: Cazarma Vienei), also known as U Barracks due to its layout, is a historic building, now ruined, in the Cetate district of Timișoara, Romania. It is the only one of the three barracks of the old Timișoara Fortress that still exists today. The other two, Petrovaradin Barracks and Transylvania Barracks, were demolished together with city development works of the first half of the 20th century.

== History ==
The original barracks was built in 1752 and had a ground floor and a first floor, with a closed outline on all four sides. It was known as the Vienna Barracks because in front of it was the Vienna Gate of the Timișoara Fortress, which provided access to the northwest, towards the Szeged–Budapest–Vienna road. The facade in the Austrian Baroque style was facing Mărăști Square.

It was seriously damaged following the siege of 1849. After 1849, a new barracks was rebuilt with three levels (ground floor and two floors), with a U-shaped plan open to the north, towards Mărăști Square. Back then it was called the Franz Joseph Barracks.

By 1923, the Military School of Artillery was located here. During the mid-20th century it housed warehouses, then several socialist trade enterprises, after the revolution it fell into disrepair.

In 2009, it was bought from the city hall, for 11 million euros, by the Investment Baltic Estates Company, which wanted to build a mall there. However, the economic crisis stopped the initiative and led it to sell the building in 2011 to businesswoman Mioara Simcelescu for 7 million euros. As of 2023, there are plans to convert the building into a five-star hotel with 105 rooms and an underground parking lot with approximately 100 spaces. The project also includes loft conversion and the construction of a new building in the yard.
