= Postal Palace, Timișoara =

Postal Palace
- Palatul Poștei
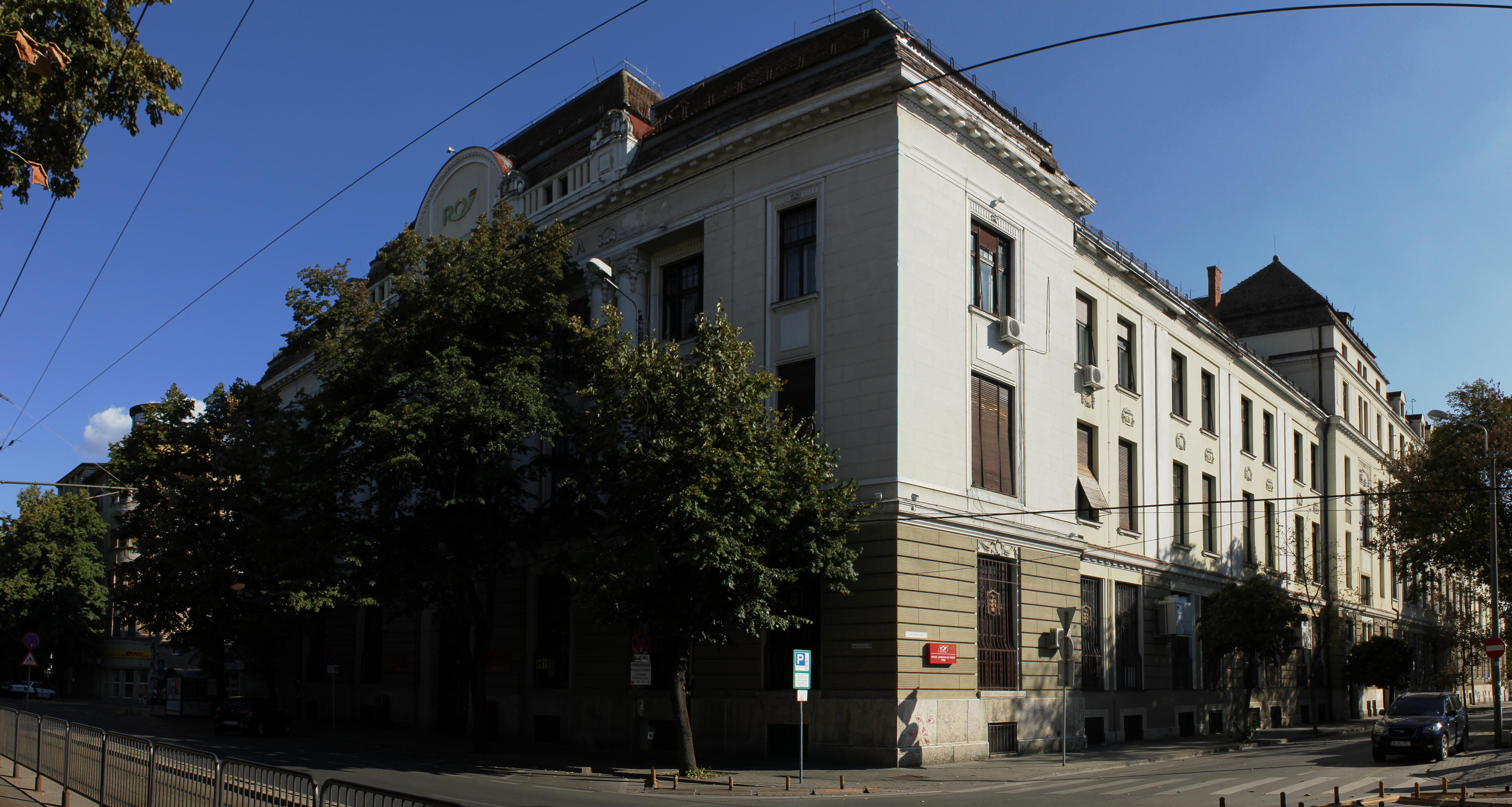
- Interactive map of the Postal Palace area
- Alternative names: Main Post Office

General information
- Location: Timișoara, Romania
- Coordinates: 45°45′17″N 21°14′4″E
- Construction started: 1911
- Completed: 1913

Technical details
- Grounds: 4,426.8 m^{2} (47,650 sq ft)

Design and construction
- Architect: Ignác Alpár

The Postal Palace, known locally as Poșta Mare (Main Post Office), is a historical building in Timișoara, Romania, housing the local branch of Poșta Română, the national operator of postal services and express courier services.

== History ==
The building that houses the post office in the city center had, from the very beginning, its current destination. Attested since 1722, the Timișoara post office operated in several buildings, but at the beginning of the 20th century, the scale of postal, telephone and telegraphic services required a new and spacious headquarters for all these services. The land on which it was built was bought by the post office from the city hall in 1905, but the actual construction began later, in 1910 or 1911.

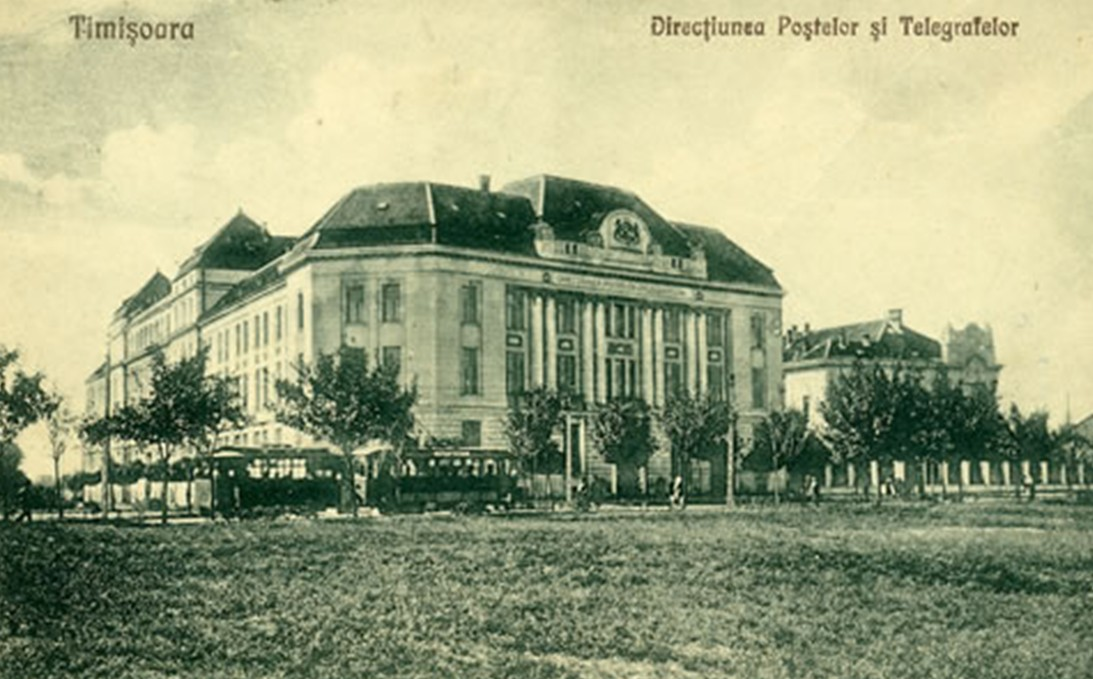
The Directorate of Posts and Telegraphs in 1926

It was built on the site of the Josef Bastion, one of the nine bastions of the fortress. The post office building was completed in 1913. The plans of the building are attributed to the architect Ignác Alpár from Budapest. The building, with basement, ground floor and two, partially three floors, has 170 rooms and several dozen corridors and other annexed spaces. Inside the palace there is an event hall with a capacity of 150 seats. From an architectural point of view, it was built in a sober style, typical of the geometric Secession, with discreet decorations.

The Timișoara post office suffered at the end of World War I, when it was looted by the Serbian occupying troops who stole the archive, library and postal, telephone and telegraph installations. In 1923, the Higher School of Posts and Telecommunications was created after the model of the one in Paris, being the only one in Romania, and it operated until 1940. During World War II, the building housed the new construction faculty established in Timișoara and the geography faculty that had taken refuge from Cluj. In the 1950s, a post office nursery and kindergarten was established, which operated until 2010. Over time, there were also various other services, directorates, inspectorates. Between 1968 and 1990, the CFR travel agency operated in the main hall. The Postal High School trained qualified personnel until 2011, when it was merged with the railway high school.

The first major renovations were undertaken in 1932. By 1936, the Postal Palace was equipped with electric lighting and central heating. The heating system was updated in the 1970s, accompanied by various repairs, and the building underwent a comprehensive renovation in the early 1980s.

== Specifications ==
It is one of the largest buildings in the city. It has 4,426.8 square meters, a large part of which is covered by the two inner courtyards. The facade from 1989 Revolution Boulevard is 36.77 meters long, the back side from Traian Grozăvescu Street is 37.6 meters, the east side from Mihai Eminescu Boulevard is 112 meters and the west side, from Cicio Pop Street, is 98.7 meters.
