= Szana Palace =

- Palatul Szana
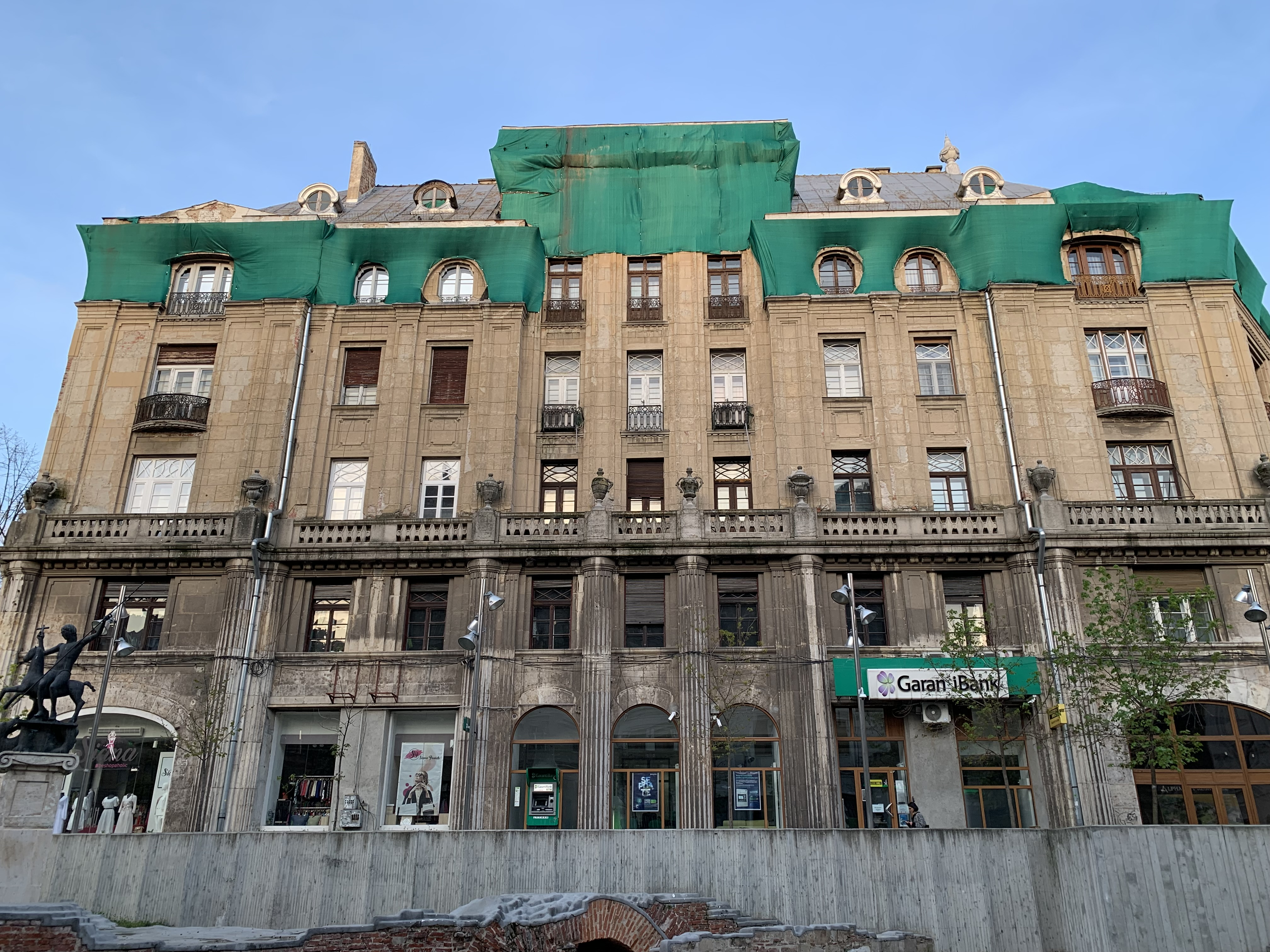
- Interactive map of the Szana Palace area
- Former names: Banat Palace

General information
- Architectural style: Historicist/Eclectic
- Location: St. George Square, Timișoara, Romania
- Coordinates: 45°45′20″N 21°13′42″E
- Construction started: 1921
- Completed: 1922

Design and construction
- Architect: Josef Kremer Jr.

Website
- szana.ro

The Szana Palace (Romanian: Palatul Szana), known as the Banat Palace (Romanian: Palatul Bănățean) in the interwar years, is a historical building in Timișoara, Romania, facing the St. George Square.

== History ==
Near the site of the current building stood a medieval church dedicated to St. George, first recorded in the 14th century, which was later replaced by the Great Mosque during the Ottoman rule of the city. In the 18th century, the Jesuit Order built a new church on the site of the former mosque, but this was also demolished at the start of the 20th century to make way for a new complex, which was to include two adjacent palaces and a church. The onset of World War I disrupted these plans, leading to several changes in the architectural design. Ultimately, the project for the future headquarters of Szana Bank was entrusted to Josef Kremer Jr., with construction taking place between 1921 and 1922.

The building was commissioned by Zsigmond (Sigismund) Szana (Szana being the Hungarianized name of Silberstein), a local banker, businessman, and philanthropist. In 1906, he founded Temeswarer Bank und Handels AG, known as Timișoara Bank or Szana Bank. Szana Bank played a significant role in the development of local industry, overseeing enterprises such as ILSA wool processing factory, Kandia chocolate factory, Lumina and Dura plants, Timișoreana brewery, and Bega mill, where about 1,000 employees worked. In the early 20th century, it was regarded as the most important financial institution in Southern Hungary, and after the Treaty of Trianon, in Transylvania and Banat.

Over time, the building has housed the headquarters of various institutions, such as: Adriatica insurance company, Balcan Impex company, Banca Timișoarei SA, the British Consulate, the Romanian Association for Relations with the Soviet Union, but also the editorial office of the Orizont magazine. Today it hosts the local branch of the Romanian Writers' Union, as well as a cultural hall inaugurated in 2023.

== Architecture ==
The building's restrained style, neutral colors, and geometric decorations, which foreshadow the Art Deco movement, lend a monumental presence to the entire structure. The main entrance is positioned at the center of the facade, flanked by two Ionic columns and topped with a triangular pediment. The main facade also features two statues representing mythological figures inspired by classical themes.

Inside, the Szana Palace is adorned in an eclectic style, blending neoclassical and Secessionist elements, along with some details that hint at the emerging Art Deco style.
