= Jolidon =

Romanian lingerie company

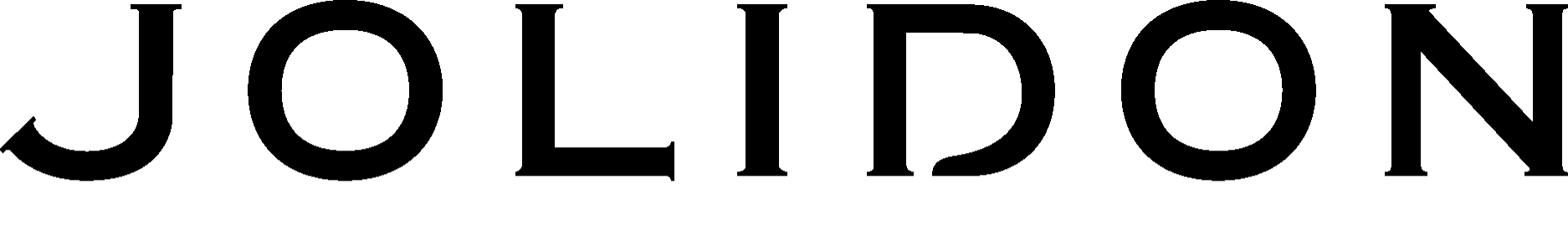
- Type: Private
- Industry: Apparel
- Founded: 1993
- Headquarters: Cluj-Napoca, Romania
- Key people: Gabriel Cîrlig (CEO)
- Revenue: €80 million (2008)
- Number of employees: 2000 (2012)
- Website: www.jolidon.com

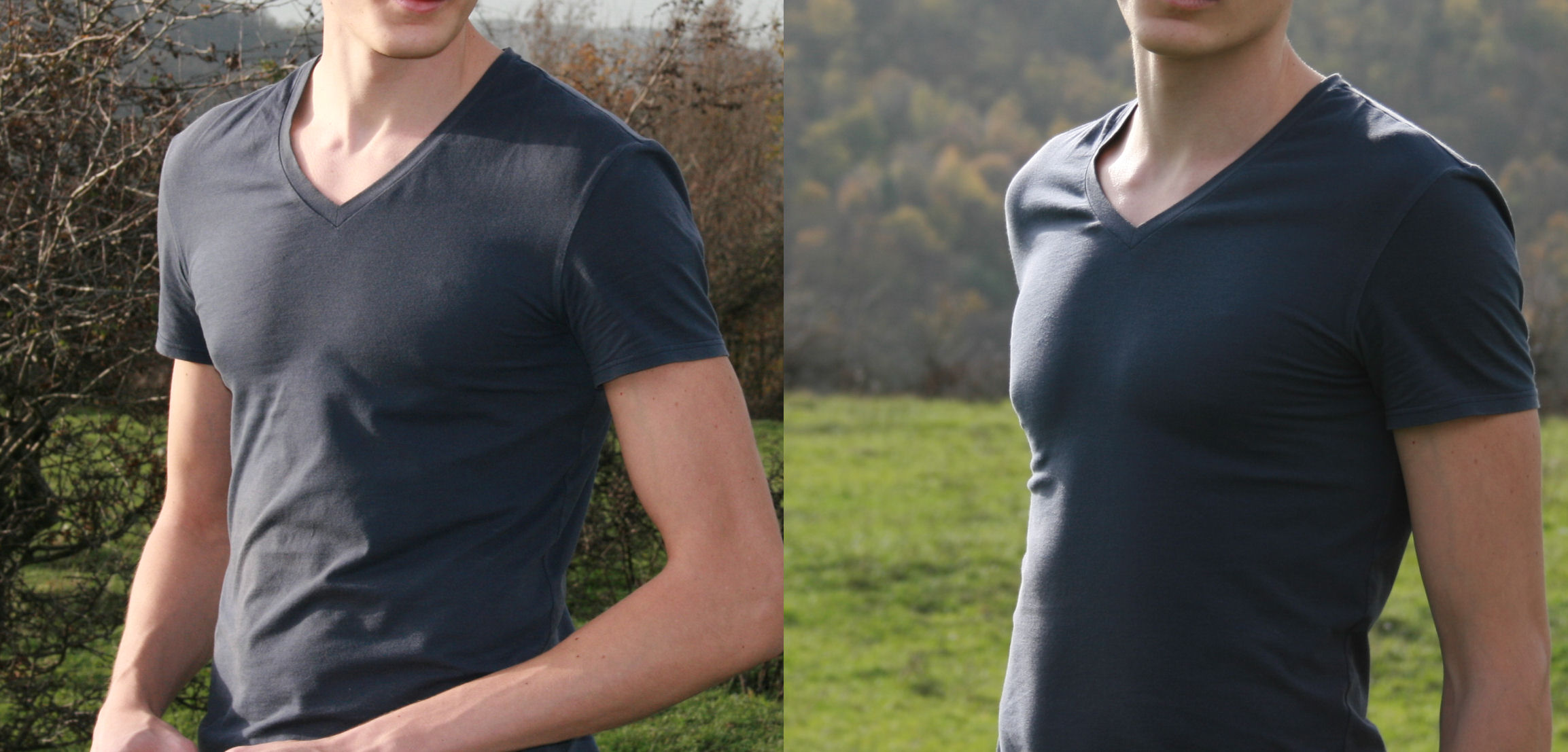
Example of Jolidon blue undershirt with sleeves

Jolidon is a Romanian lingerie and swimsuit manufacturer, founded in 1993 in Cluj-Napoca.

In 1993, an entrepreneur, Gabriel Cîrlig, identified in the Romanian market after the 1989 revolution two types of products that were necessary, but scarcely available at the time, lingerie and swimsuits. After 27 years of activity, Jolidon products are exported especially to the European Union but also to Americas and Asia.

In 2000, the company founded Jolidon Hungary KFT in Budapest, and then in 2001 Jolidon Italia SRL in Milan. Later, it extended to France as Jolidon France SARL, first in Paris, then in Lyon. As of March 2008, Jolidon operated 103 stores, 65 in Romania, 35 in Italy, and 3 in Hungary. It also franchises 10 boutiques in France. In addition to these stores, Jolidon is also sold at Uplift Intimate Apparel in Carmel, Indiana, USA. At the end of 2009, Jolidon's own network totaled 85 stores in Romania.

== History ==
In 1993, Gabriel Cîrlig, had found that the Romanian market of after 1989 was poor in two types of products, lingerie and bathing suits. The first tailory had 3–4 sewing machines – it was a minimum needed to work on lingerie.

In 1993–1994, it entered the Romanian market, especially in Transylvania.

In 1995–1998, it expanded on the Romanian market, the objective was to become a leader. In 1998, branches were opened in Bucharest and Timișoara.

In 2000 Jolidon established Jolidon Hungary KFT in Budapest, in 2001 Jolidon Italy SRL in Milan, and in 2003 Jolidon France SRL with the headquarters in Paris, and in 2004 Jolidon France opened the headquarters in Lyon.

In 2004, Jolidon had purchased its main rival at the Romanian market, it was the Argos Company from Cluj-Napoca with a 60-year tradition in tailoring lingerie and swimwear and over 800 employees.

In 2006, Jolidon took over Flacăra, one of the largest garment factories in Romania, with 1,000 employees, who also owned the Falla brand, for the amount of 800,000 euros. Later, the employees from Flacăra were moved to the Argos's shed.

In 2007, Jolidon bought the majority stake of the Ineu Knitwear factory.

January 2009 represented the total success of the PRELUDE brand - a luxury brand from the Jolidon group's portfolio - by winning the Grand Jury Prize and the Specialist Audience Award at SIL 2009, within the event "Ultralingerie".

In 2009, it expanded its business to Ireland and Finland and contracted clients in Dubai, Saudi Arabia, Qatar and South Korea. Its products were exported throughout Europe: Italy, France, Hungary, Germany, Switzerland, Belgium, Slovenia, Croatia, Poland, Latvia, Austria, Cyprus, Malta, but also in the United States, Canada, South Africa, Lebanon, Israel and Asia.

In 2011, Jolidon participated for the 14th time at the International Lingerie Show (SIL) Paris, the most important event in the world of lingerie.

In 2012, Jolidon marked the 15th consecutive participation in SIL Paris, in which he participates with the well-known names of the profile world. Jolidon estimated that it would return on profit this year, after three years of losses, and rely on an advance with 15% of turnover compared to last year, when it had a business of 90 million lei (about 21 million euros).

On June 5, 2012, Jolidon opened the largest store – shop.jolidon.ro, thus making its debut in the online commerce environment.
