= Mocioni Palace =

- Palatul Mocioni
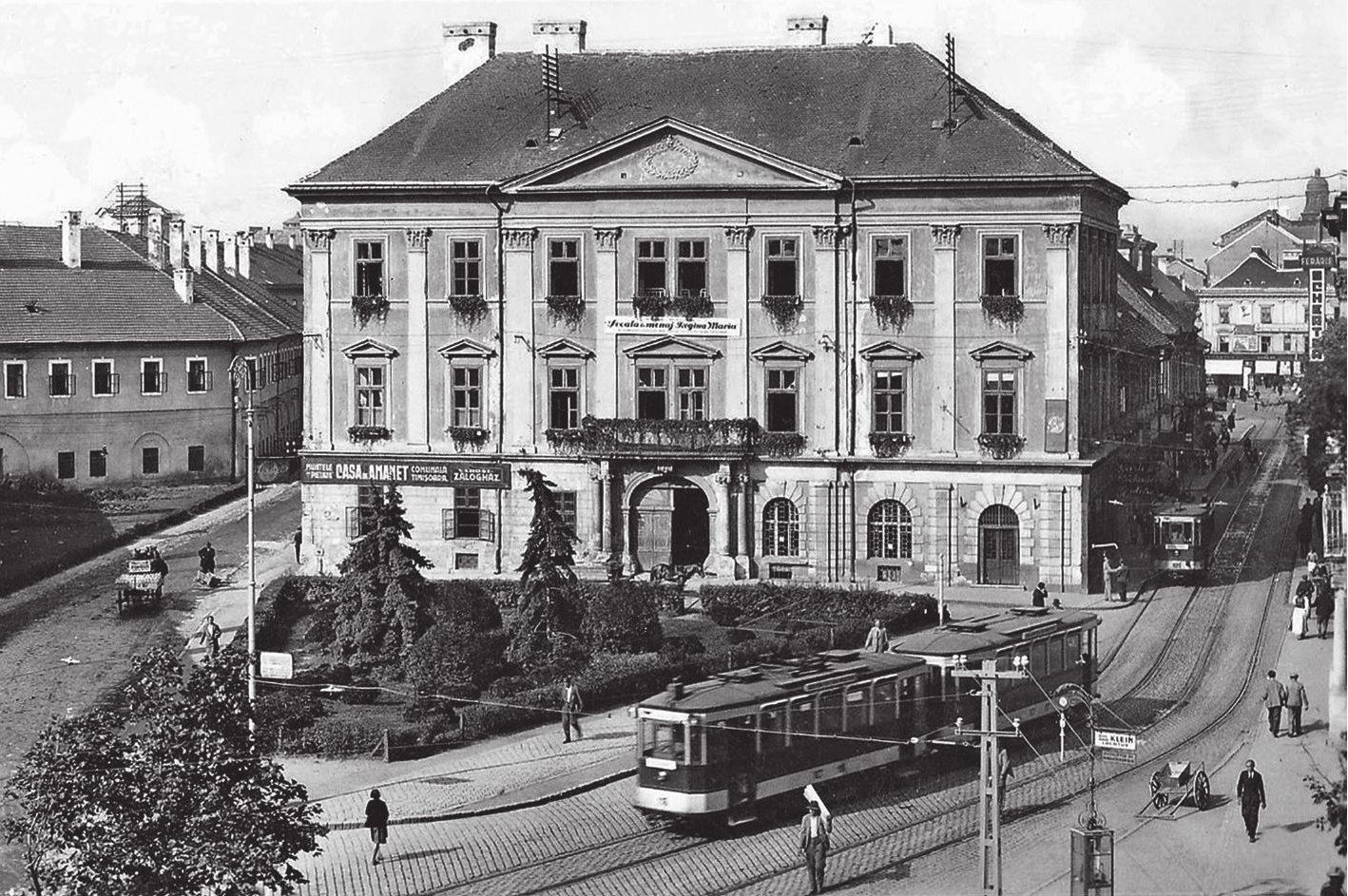
- Interactive map of the Mocioni Palace area
- Alternative names: Mocsonyi Palace

General information
- Status: Demolished
- Architectural style: Neoclassical
- Location: 1 Balaș Square, Timișoara, Romania
- Coordinates: 45°45′19″N 21°13′50″E
- Completed: Mid-18th century
- Demolished: 1948

Design and construction
- Architect: János Kőszeghy

The Mocioni Palace (Romanian: Palatul Mocioni), also known as the Mocsonyi Palace, was an 18th century neoclassical building located at 1 Balaș Square (Hungarian: Balázs tér; German: Balazsplatz) in Timișoara, Romania. The Timișana Bank operated out of the building from 1909 until 1913, when the Timișana Bank Palace was constructed diagonally opposite. The building was demolished in 1948.

Today, the site of the former building is occupied by the Bega Shopping Center.

== History ==
The building was constructed in the mid-18th century in the neoclassical style by János Kőszeghy, brother of Bishop László Kőszeghy. In the 19th century, it was inherited by János's daughter, Juditha Kőszeghy, the widow of Zsigmond Deschán, who used it as her winter residence. On 30 April 1835, Juditha sold the property to Anna Joannovits—the mother of György Joannovits, a former state secretary in the Ministry of Education—for 95,000 forints and 100 gold coins.

In 1838, the Joannovics family leased most of the first floor, along with a substantial portion of the ground floor, to the shareholders' association of the Timișan National Casino (Hungarian: Temesi Nemzeti Casino; German: Temeser National-Casino). The lease was set to run until the end of April 1841, with an annual rent of 3,400 forints. The agreement included a clause allowing the association to extend the lease for an additional three years—until 1844—at the same rate. The association, established in 1838, comprised 366 members of Timișoara's elite.

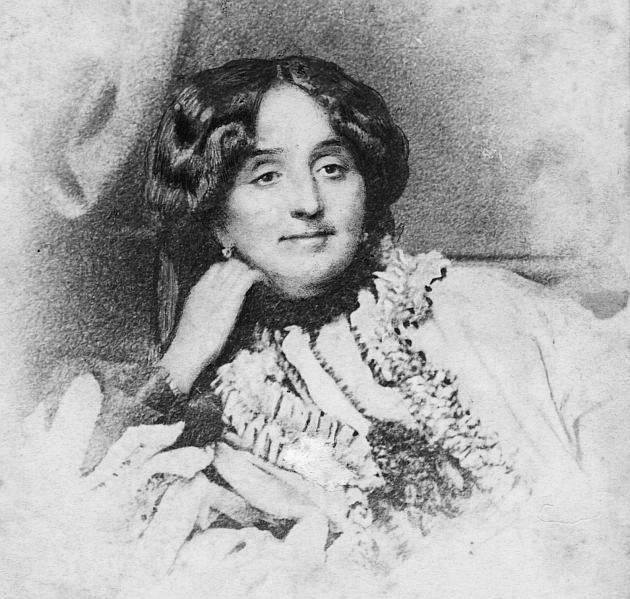
Katalin Mocsonyi

After the death of Katalin Mocsonyi, who left no will, the Imperial and Royal Tribunal of Timișoara issued a public notice on 9 May 1878, at the request of Sándor Sever and Eugen Mocsonyi. The announcement called on anyone with inheritance claims to one-third of the property registered in the land register under number 34, located in Timișoara's Cetate district, to come forward within 45 days. In 1899, Miklós Lendvai noted in his work Temes vármegye nemes családjai that the building still belonged to the Mocioni family.

From 1909 to 1913, when the Timișana Bank Palace was built, diagonally opposite this building, Banca Timișana operated here.

In October 1912, the Timișoara City Council unanimously approved the purchase of the property listed under land register number 34 for 350,000 crowns. The acquisition aimed to facilitate the widening of Zápolya Street, now known as Proclamation of Timișoara Street, by demolishing the building. The decision received official approval from the Minister of the Interior of the Kingdom of Hungary on 19 April 1913, and the property officially became city-owned on 1 May 1913. Initially, City Hall planned to temporarily relocate part of the girls' school into the building until its eventual demolition.

In 1913, it was recorded that the city of Timișoara secured a loan of 500,000 crowns from the Treasury of the Diocese of Cenad to finance the purchase of the Mocioni Palace and the expropriation of the Cernoievici House. The latter was partially demolished in 1943 to create a road linking Sfântul Ioan and Coriolan Brediceanu streets, thereby connecting the Cetate and Mehala districts, and was completely demolished in 1945.

In 1924, the School of the Sisters of Notre Dame founded the Queen Marie School of Housekeeping on the site, which would later evolve into the Banat National College. As of 1939, the building was still officially owned by the municipality.

The building was demolished in August 1948.

== Architecture ==
The building had three levels and featured a symmetrical façade. Entry was through a central portal, flanked on either side by Corinthian columns.

The ground floor was adorned with bossage detailing, and the rounded windows were symmetrically positioned on either side of the central portal—three on the left and three on the right.

The first and second floors of the façade were adorned with pilasters running vertically between the windows. These windows were rectangular and unadorned, aligned directly above those on the ground floor. The central windows, positioned above the main entrance, were double, accentuating the building's central axis. On the first floor, the windows featured triangular pediments, and a wrought iron balcony was placed above the entrance portal.

The roof featured a prominent triangular pediment above the main entrance, adorned at its center with a laurel wreath motif.
