= Bega Shopping Center =

- Location: Timișoara, Romania
- Coordinates: 45°45′20″N 21°13′50″E
- Opened: 4 December 1973
- Previous names: Bega Department Store (Romanian: Magazinul Universal Bega) (1973–1997)
- Owner: Bega Group
- Architect: Vasile Oprișan
- Num. of anchor tenants: 1
- Floor area: 12,000 m^{2} (130,000 sq ft)
- Floors: 6
- Public transit: Bus lines 33B, E2, E4, E7, M45; Tram lines 2, 4
- Website: www.bega-shoppingcenter.ro

Bega Shopping Center is a shopping center in the historical area of Timișoara owned by Bega Group. Bega Shopping Center has six floors and a leasable area of 12,000 m^{2} (130,000 sq ft).

== History ==
The Bega department store was inaugurated on 4 December 1973. The store was built according to a project by IPROTIM, with architect Vasile Oprișan as project manager. In this place, in the former Balaș Square, there was the Mocioni Palace; it housed a pawnshop and a housekeeping school and was demolished in 1948.

After its privatization in 1997, the Bega department store was bought by brothers Marius and Emil Cristescu, who transformed it into Bega Shopping Center and, over the years, completely changed the appearance of the building. A new wing was completed in 2005, increasing the commercial area to 12,000 m^{2} (130,000 sq ft).

== Facilities ==
Bega Shopping Center has a main building and two wings. The main building consists of basement, ground floor and four floors with a total commercial area of 8,600 m^{2} (93,000 sq ft), of which 7,200 m^{2} (78,000 sq ft) are the shopping venue. A 1,300 m^{2} (14,000 sq ft) Carrefour supermarket located in the basement of the main building serves as anchor tenant. A 400-seat food court was opened on the third floor in 2012. As of 2021, stores include dm, Jolidon, Pepco, Puma and Yves Rocher.
