= Mocioni family =

Austro-Hungarian noble family

Coat of arms of the Mocsonyi de Foen family

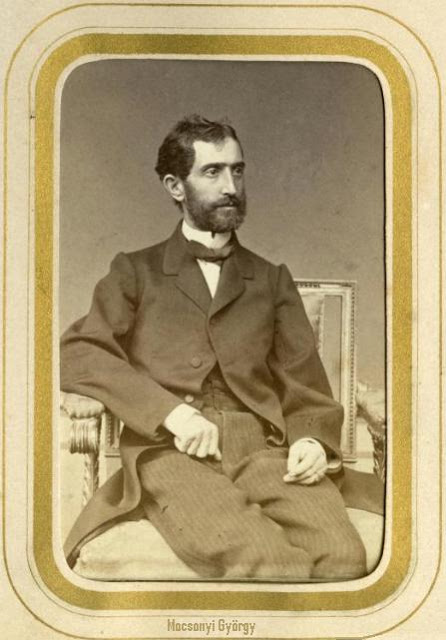
Gheorghe Mocioni (1823 - 1901)

The Mocioni family (Hungarian: Mocsonyi de Föény), also spelled as Mocsonyi de Foen, was an Austro-Hungarian noble family whose members held significant positions within the Kingdom of Hungary.

== History ==
The family was of Aromanian origin, migrating from Moscopole (located in modern southern Albania) in the Ottoman Empire to the Kingdom of Hungary (and Banat) at the end of the 17th century. As noted philanthropists and bankers, they were awarded with the title of Baron in Austria. They had branches in Romania, Serbia, (Belgrade) and in Hungary, (Budapest).

== Notable people ==
- Alexandru Mocioni (1841–1909) - writer, journalist, politician, deputy, composer
- Andrei Mocioni (1812–1880) - politician;
- Anton Mocioni (1816–1890) - officer, deputy
- Anton de Mocioni (1882) - minister
- Eugeniu Mocioni (1844–1901) - deputy
- Ecaterina Mocioni - Baroness of Foeni
- Gheorghe Mocioni (1823–1901) - deputy
- Petru Mocioni (1804–1858 assassinated) - Torontál deputy
- Zeno Mocioni

== See also ==
- Mocioni Palace
- Alexandru Mocioni Square
