= Civic Park, Timișoara =

Urban park in Timișoara, Romania

Civic Park
- City Park
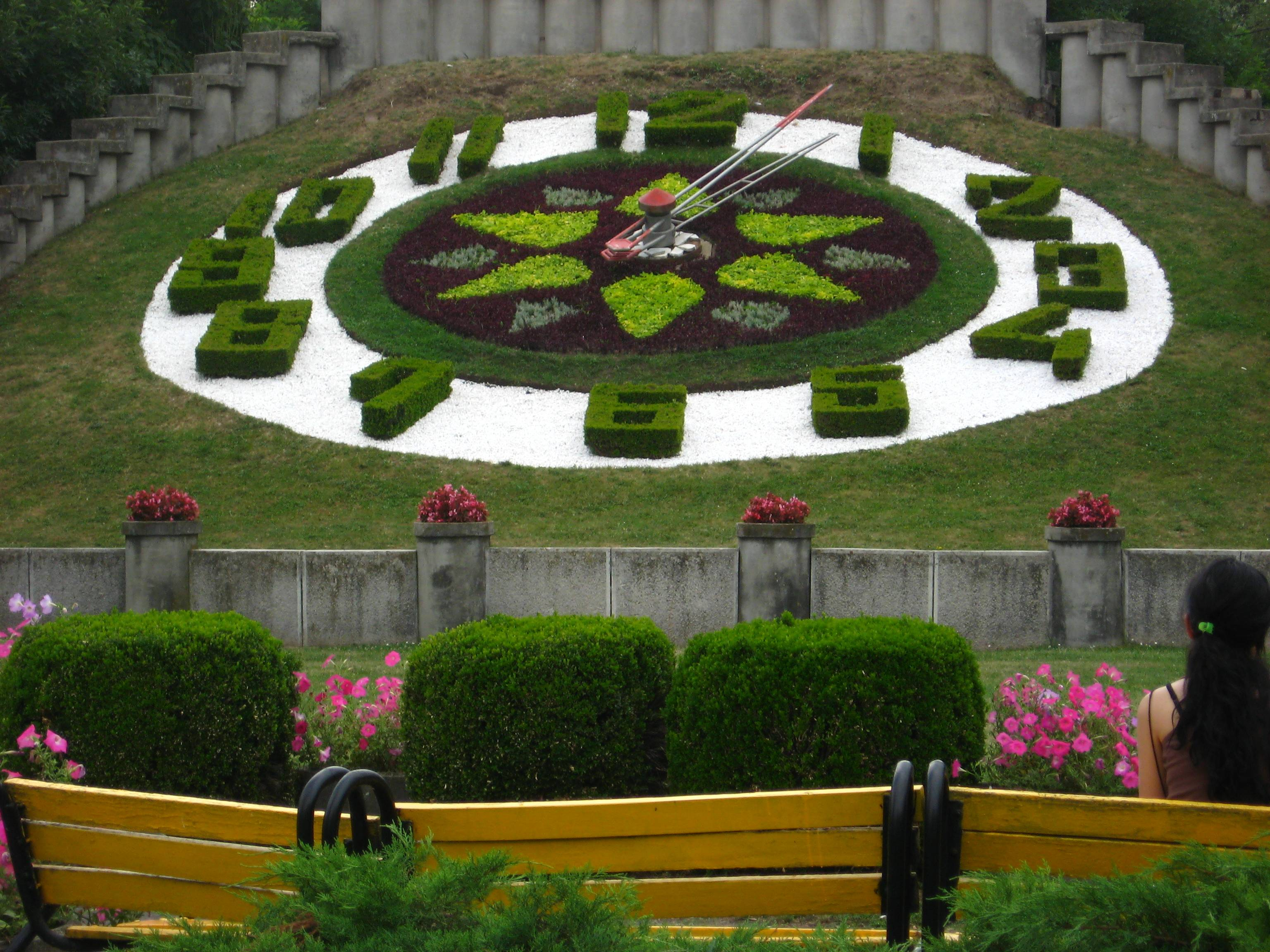
- The floral clock in the Civic Park
- Interactive map of Civic Park
- Type: Urban park
- Location: Timișoara, Romania
- Coordinates: 45°45′14″N 21°13′53″E
- Area: 7.6 ha
- Administrator: Timișoara City Hall
- Species: 89

The Civic Park (Romanian: Parcul Civic), also known as the City Park (Romanian: Parcul Cetății), is an urban park in central Timișoara.

== Location ==
The Civic Park is located at the border of the former fortress of Timișoara, behind the Continental Hotel, being delimited by Carol Telbisz Street, Ion C. Brătianu Boulevard, 1989 Revolution Boulevard and Mihai Eminescu Boulevard and has an area of 76,000 m^{2}, of which 67,500 m^{2} lawn and trees, 5,000 m^{2} alleys, and the rest, other spaces.

== History ==
Between 1730 and 1961, the Transylvanian Barracks (German: Siebenbürger Kaserne), one of the largest military barracks in Europe, located in the vicinity of the Timișoara Fortress, operated on the land of the current park. Its demolition aimed at building a civic center with a huge opera house and administrative buildings, a project that was abandoned, being replaced by the Civic Park. Between 1968 and 1971, the Continental Hotel, the tallest building in Timișoara at that time, was built. During the same period, the boulevard that crosses the park was built. After 1971, here were planted, with the existing material in the city's nurseries, numerous trees, without an outlined thought.

The symbol of the park is the floral clock; its design changes twice a year.

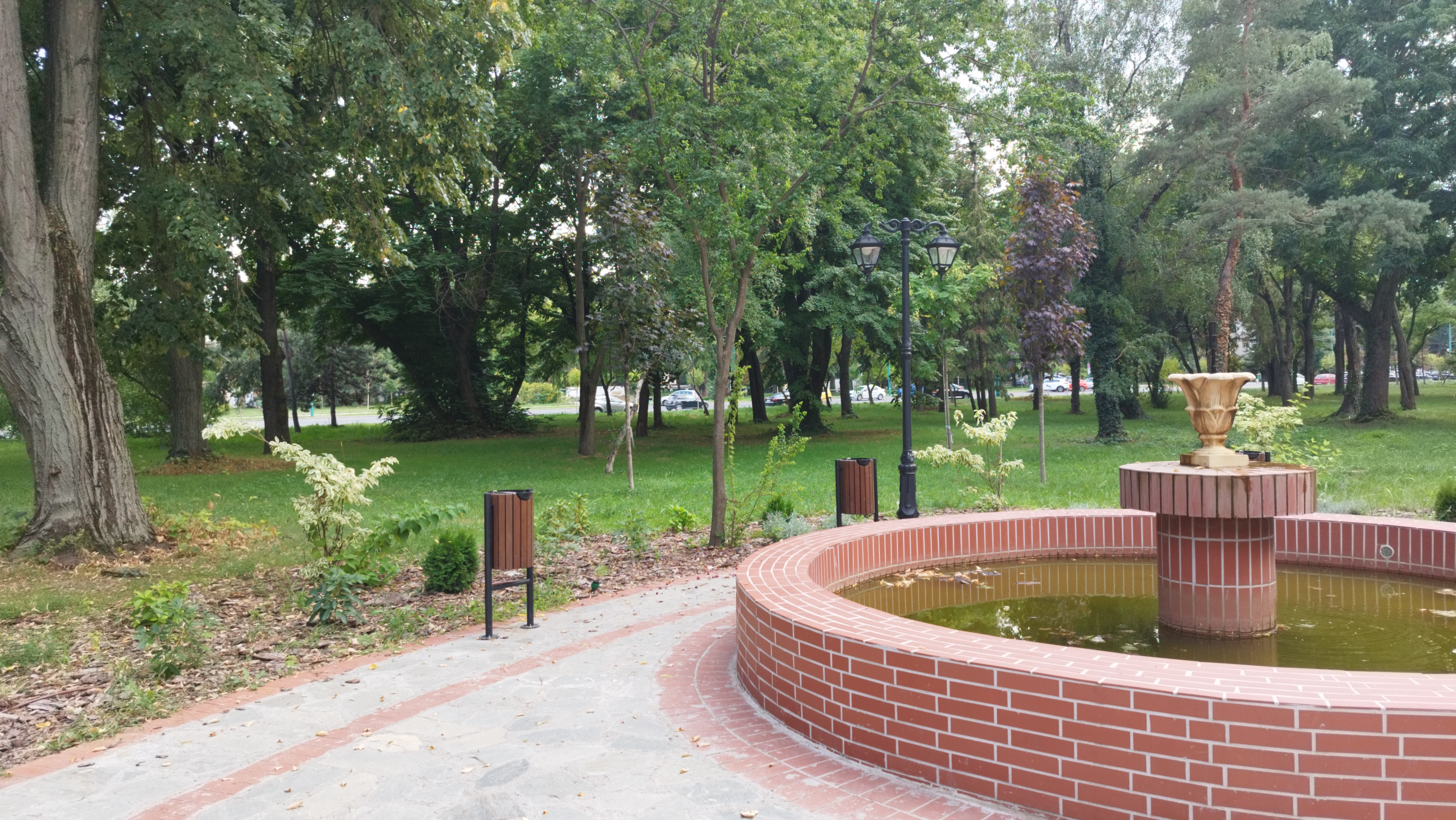
The Civic Park in 2022

Since 2019, the park is in a process of modernization that involves the renewal of alleys and street furniture, the construction of an ornamental fountain and the planting of nearly 1,000 trees and shrubs (pines, thujas, magnolias, lilacs, tulip trees, rhododendrons, hydrangeas, lavenders, azaleas, etc.) and almost 4,000 roses.
