= Palace of the National Bank, Timișoara =

Palace of the National Bank
- Palatul Băncii Naționale
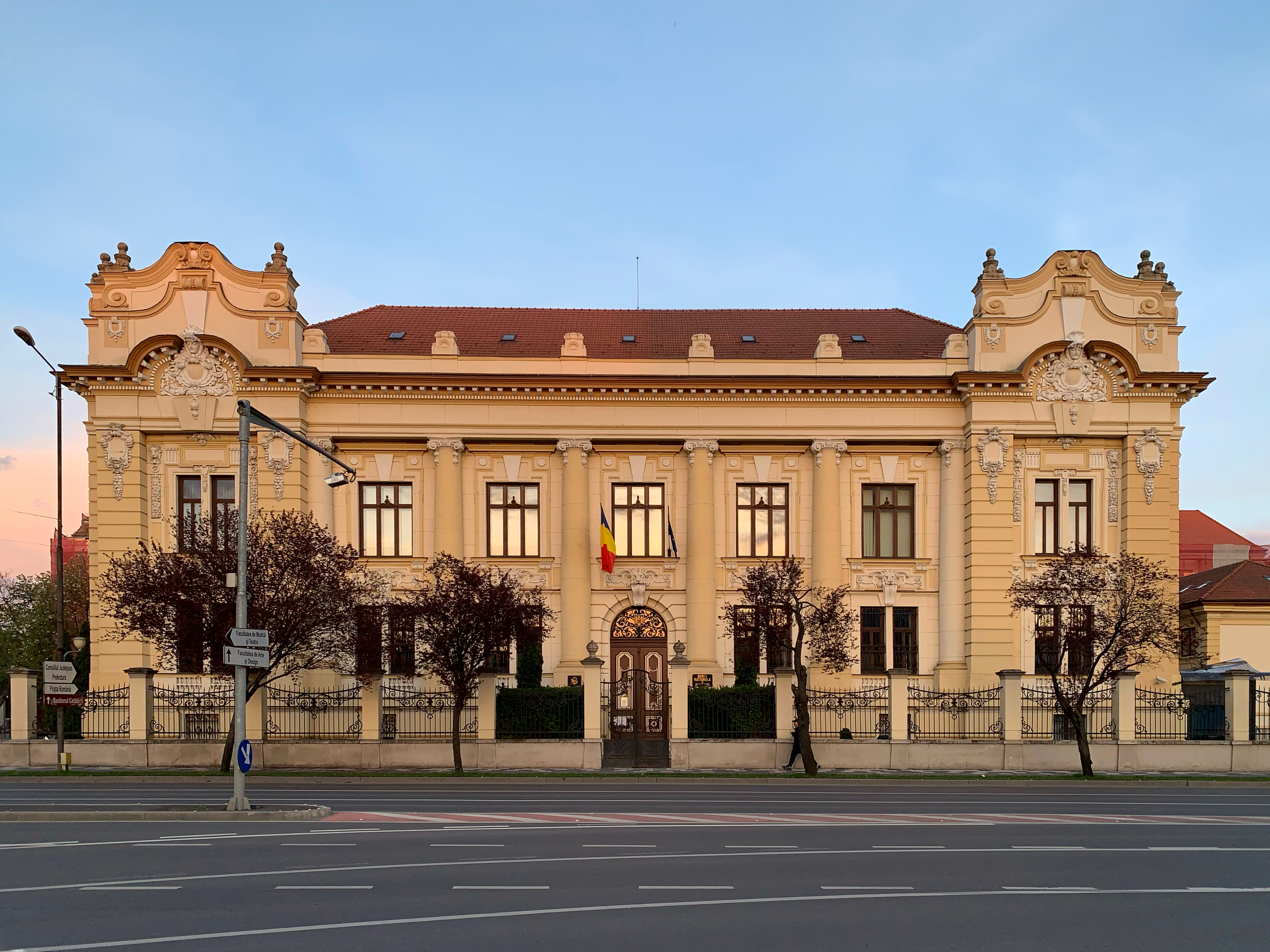
- Interactive map of the Palace of the National Bank area
- Former names: Austro-Hungarian Bank (1904–1918); State Bank

General information
- Architectural style: Secession
- Location: Timișoara, Romania
- Coordinates: 45°45′18″N 21°14′1″E
- Construction started: 1903
- Completed: 1904

Design and construction
- Architect: Josef Hubert
- Main contractor: Alois Schlosser

The Palace of the National Bank (Romanian: Palatul Băncii Naționale) is a historical building in Timișoara, Romania, housing the local branch of the National Bank of Romania.

== History ==
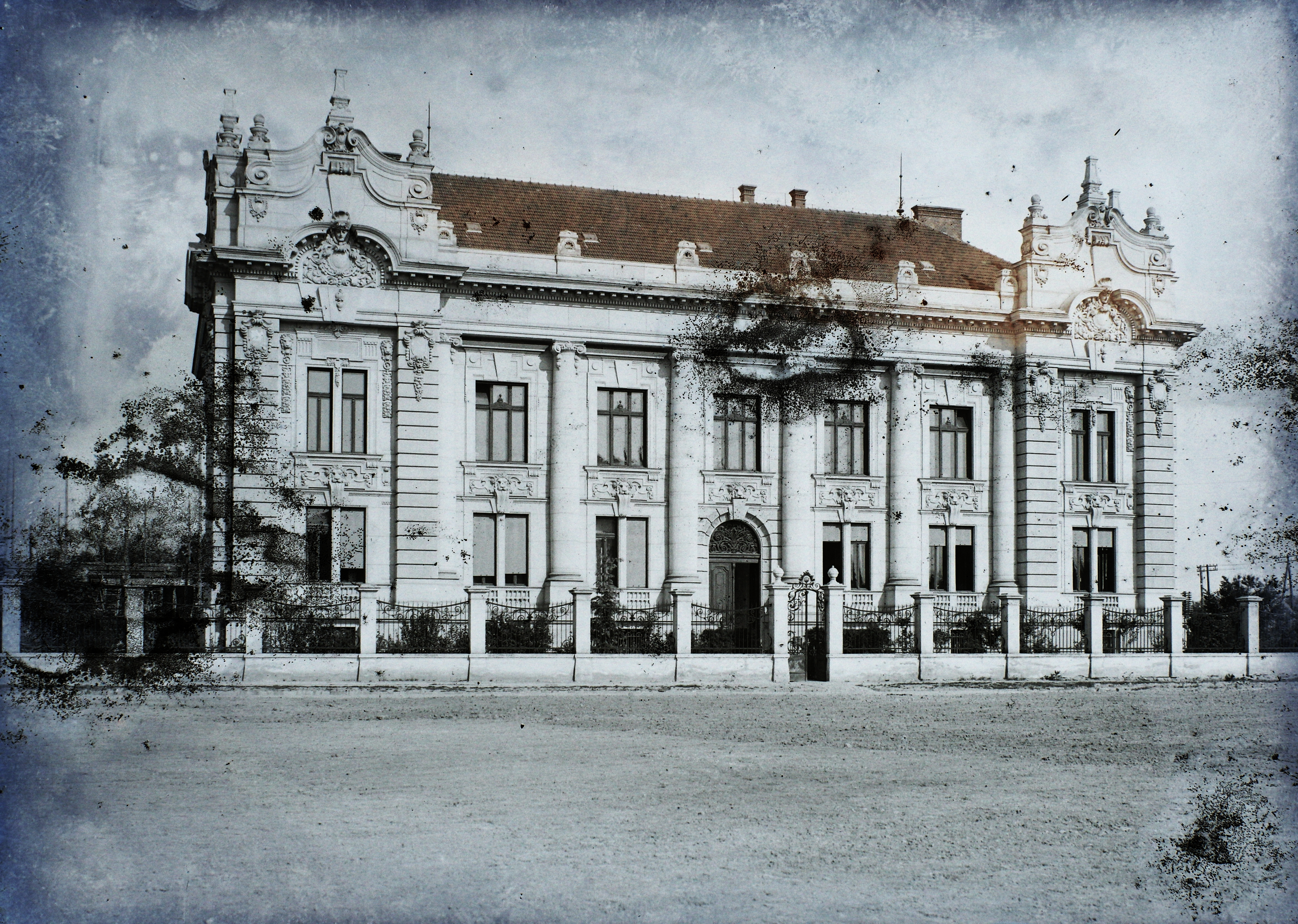
The palace in 1910, then the headquarters of the Austro-Hungarian Bank

Construction began in 1903, on land purchased from the city hall, and was completed in just one year. The building was designed by the Budapest architect Josef Hubert, and the contractor Alois Schlosser participated in the works. It was the first Timișoara bank whose headquarters were not located inside the fortress, but in its immediate vicinity on the land freed by the fortification walls and the Transylvania Gate. The foundation works were quite difficult, because concrete was used and the bank's armored warehouses were set up. Between 1904 and 1918, the building served as the seat of the Austro-Hungarian Bank, and then of the State Bank. It was the only "Austro-Hungarian" and not royal Hungarian civil institution that existed in Timișoara.

=== BNR in Timișoara ===
On 6 November 1919, under the imperative of financing the country in the aftermath of the World War I and of achieving the monetary unification required following the Great Union, the General Council of the National Bank of Romania resolved to establish branches in Brașov, Sibiu, Cluj, Arad, Timișoara, and Oradea. The decision further stipulated that measures would be undertaken to secure the buildings formerly belonging to the Austro-Hungarian Bank.

The National Bank of Romania agency in Timișoara began operating in 1920, with Stamate Dobrovicescu—previously director of the branches in Pitești and Turnu Severin—appointed as its first director. On 29 March 1921, following an agreement concluded in Vienna between the liquidators of the Austro-Hungarian Bank and representatives of the Romanian state, the Timișoara agency took over the headquarters of the former issuing bank of the Dual Monarchy. Subsequently, on 2 January 1922, the General Council of the National Bank of Romania approved the purchase of 13 properties that had belonged to the Austro-Hungarian Bank, for a total sum of 25 million lei.

== Architecture ==
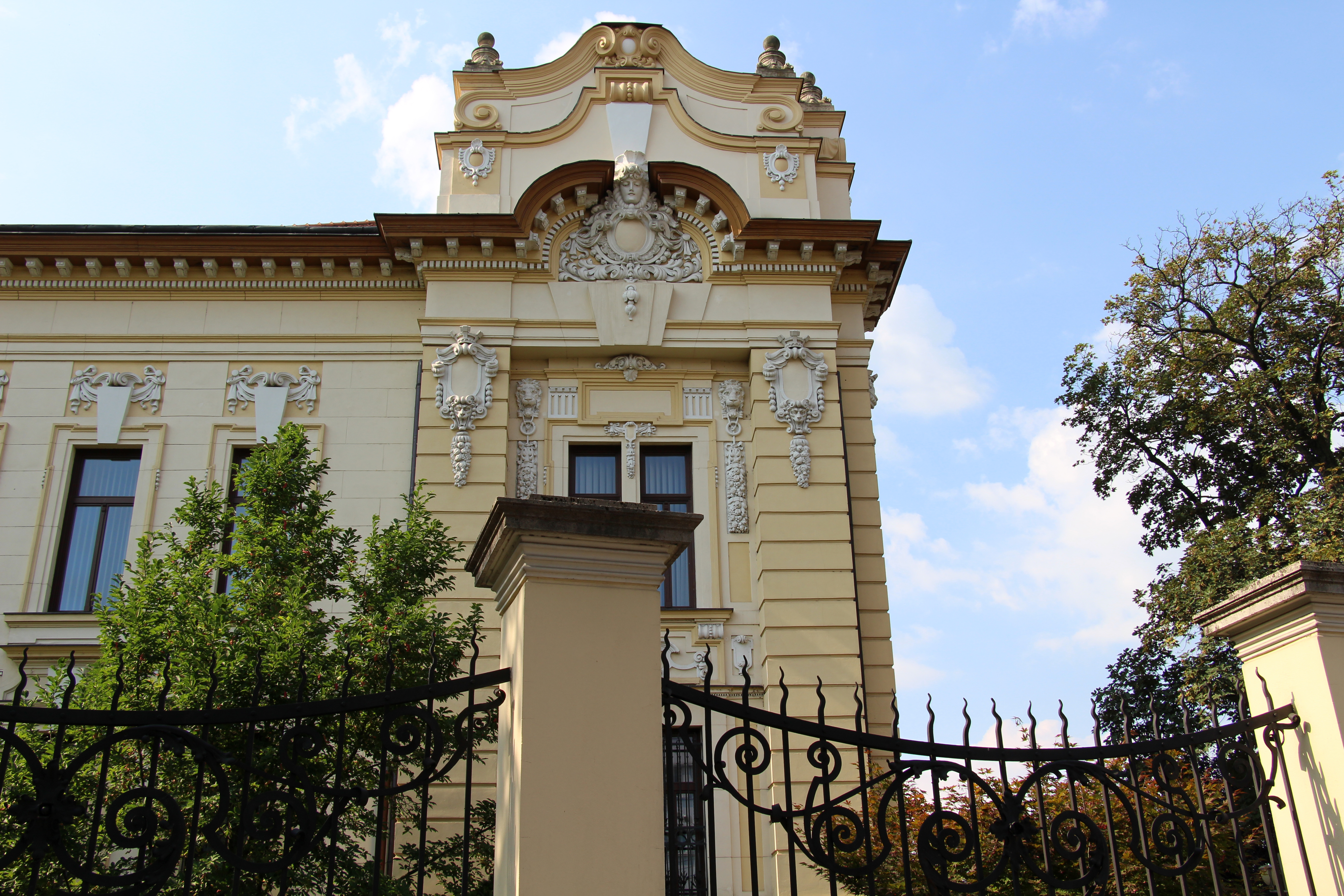
Architectural details on the facade

The facade stands out for its decorations specific to the late Viennese Baroque combined with the Secession style. The heads of lions, with which the facade is decorated, symbolize power and wealth. The building, surrounded by a garden and a masonry fence with iron railing, has two entrances that open into an elegant hall with imposing columns and counters.
