= Continental Hotel Timișoara =

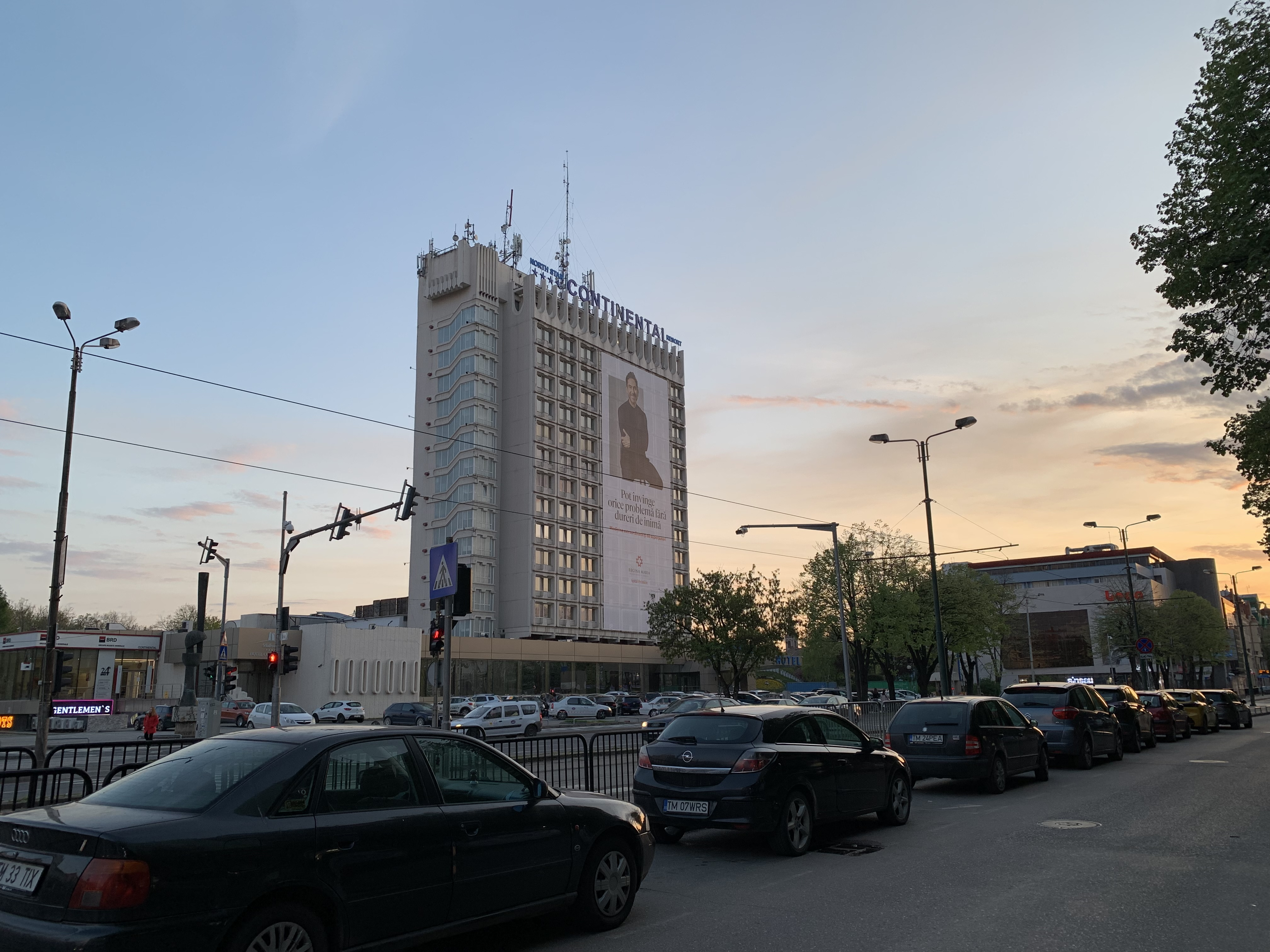

General information
- Type: Hotel
- Architectural style: Modernist
- Location: 2A 1989 Revolution Boulevard, Timișoara, Romania
- Coordinates: 45°45′18″N 21°13′56″E
- Completed: 1971
- Height: 59 m

Technical details
- Floor count: 15

Design and construction
- Architect: Gheorghe Gîrleanu

Other information
- Number of rooms: 169
- Number of restaurants: 1
- Number of bars: 1

Website
- hotelcontinental.ro

Continental Hotel, branded as North Star Continental Resort, is a four-star hotel in the western Romanian city of Timișoara. It is one of the city's most representative buildings, part of the built heritage of 1989 Revolution Boulevard.

== History ==
In the late 1960s, the Communist Party called for the development of various commercial spaces, hotels, cultural centers, stadiums, and sports halls in major cities. Design institutes were authorized to create more refined and aesthetically significant architectural plans. It was the period when the Bega department store, the Continental and Timișoara hotels, the Youth House, the Modex Fashion House, the Olimpia Hall, and others were built in Timișoara.

Architect Gheorghe Gîrleanu was tasked with designing the Continental Hotel, which was envisioned from the outset as an urban landmark for the area, built in a purist modernist style. It became the first tower building in Timișoara. The structure features 14 floors, with 12 dedicated to accommodations. The hotel boasts a total of 169 rooms, including 119 double-bed rooms, 16 connecting rooms, 30 single-bed rooms, and two apartments.

In 1975, the hotel was expanded to incorporate the rear terrace and the supply yard, which was later enclosed to create additional interior space. In the early 2000s, the Continental Hotel underwent a major rehabilitation, which included extensive interior design updates and several modifications to the ground-floor facades facing the 1989 Revolution and Ion C. Brătianu boulevards.

== Amenities ==
Continental Hotel provides a diverse array of amenities, including 169 guest rooms (with accommodations for disabled guests), an international and Romanian cuisine restaurant, a conference center, the Miami Terrace with an outdoor pool, a lobby bar, the Continental beauty salon, the Galaxy nightclub, and a fully equipped fitness center.
