= Timișoara =

City and county seat in Timiș County, Romania

- Municipality
- Municipality of Timișoara
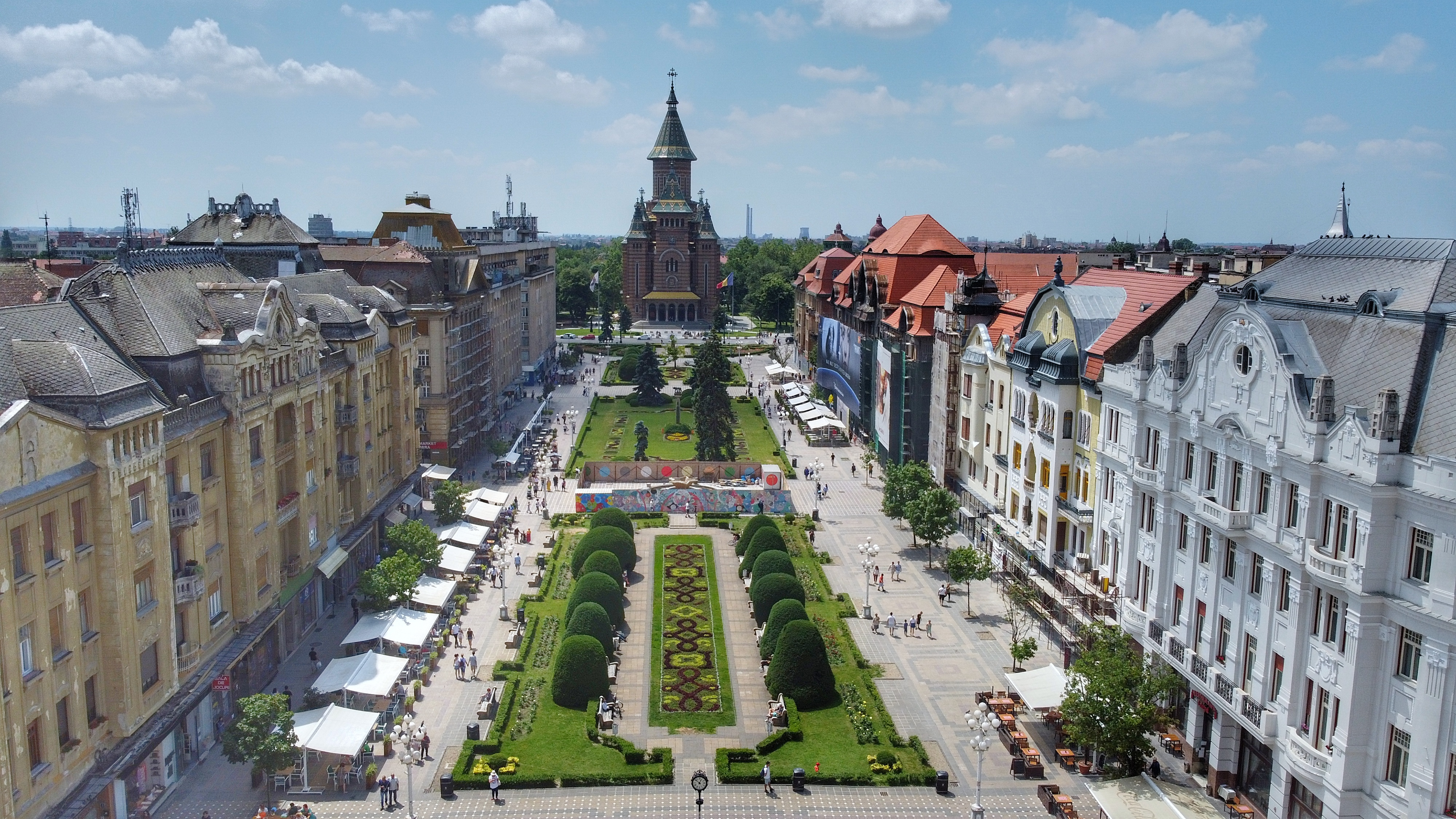
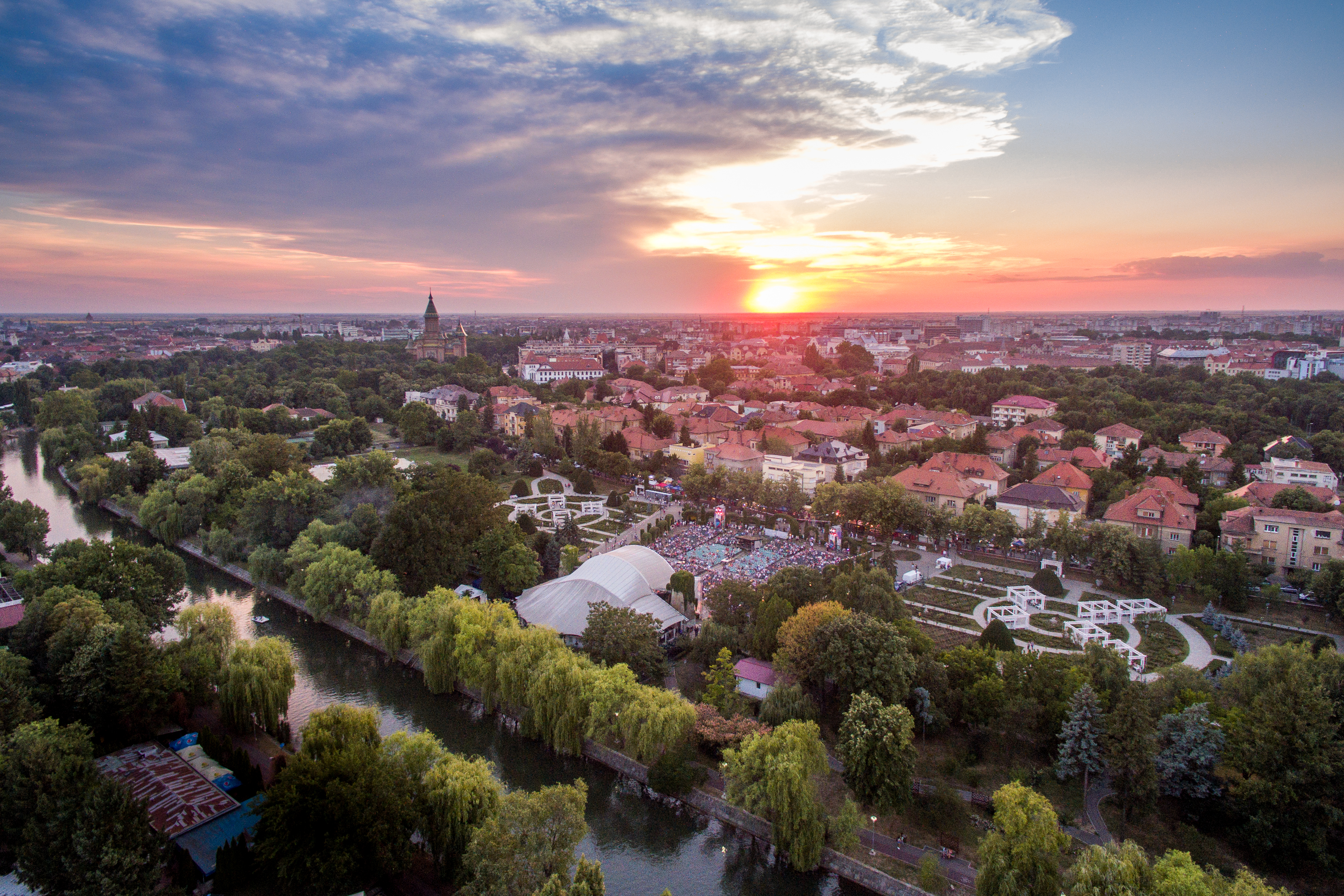
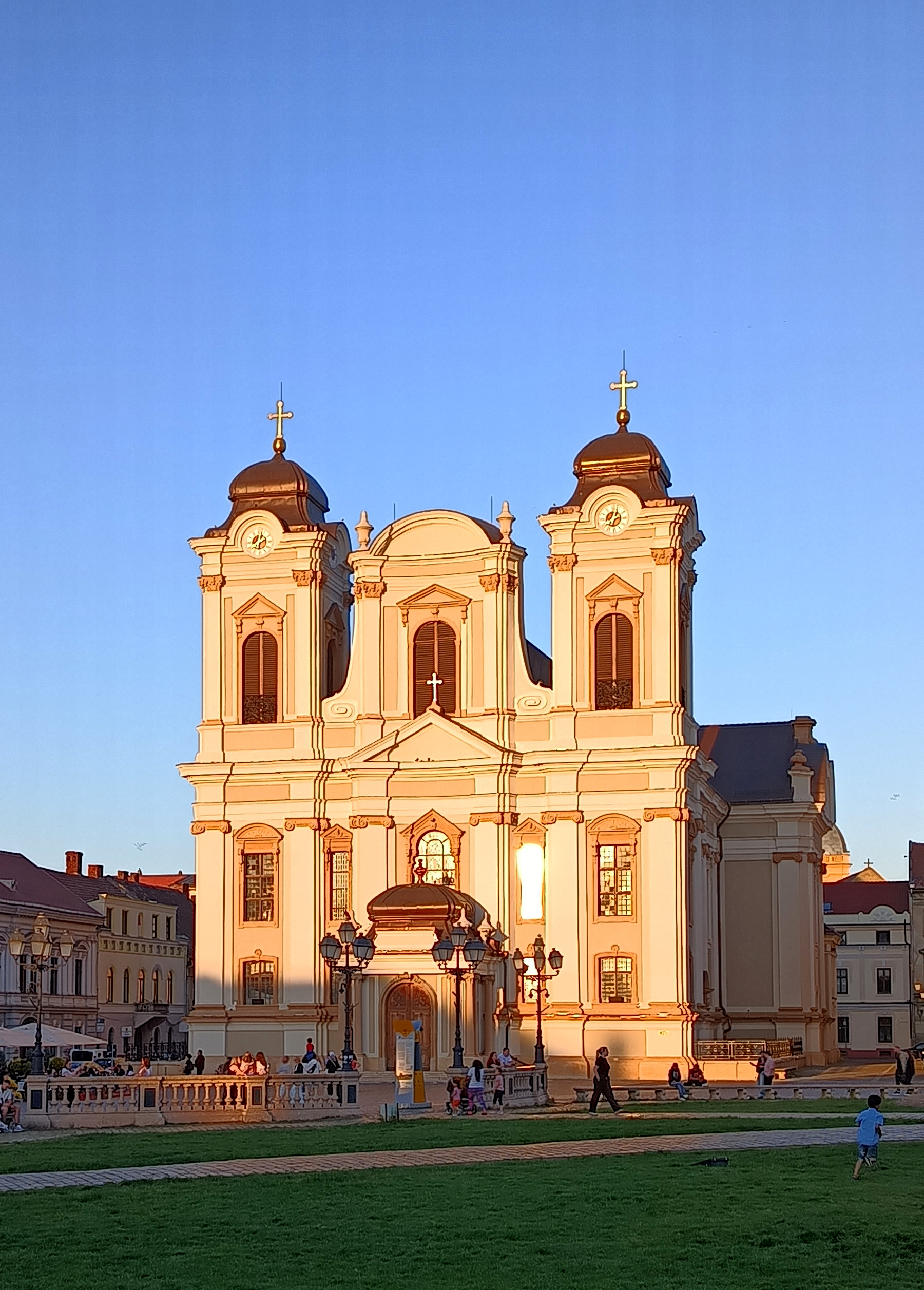
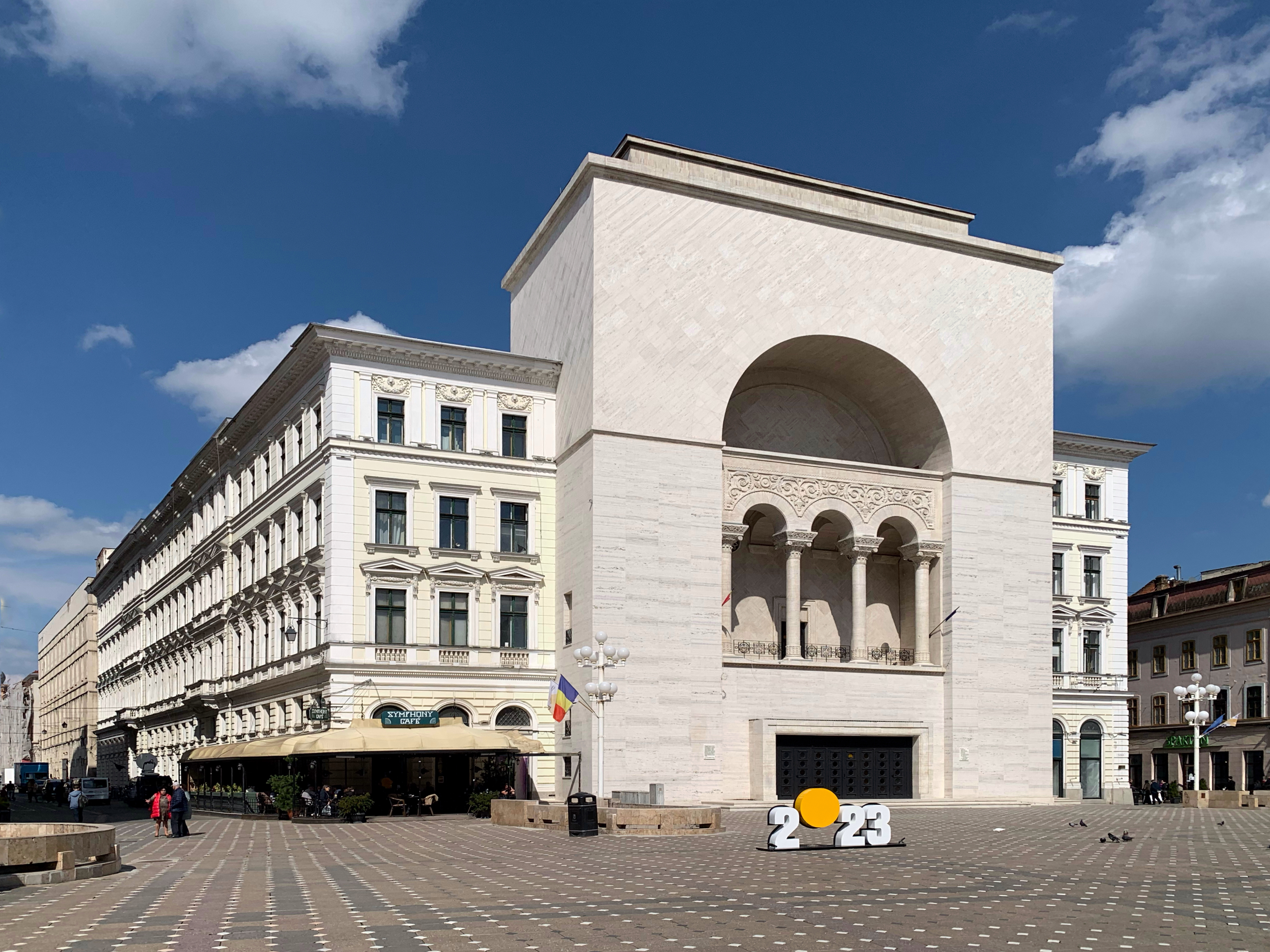
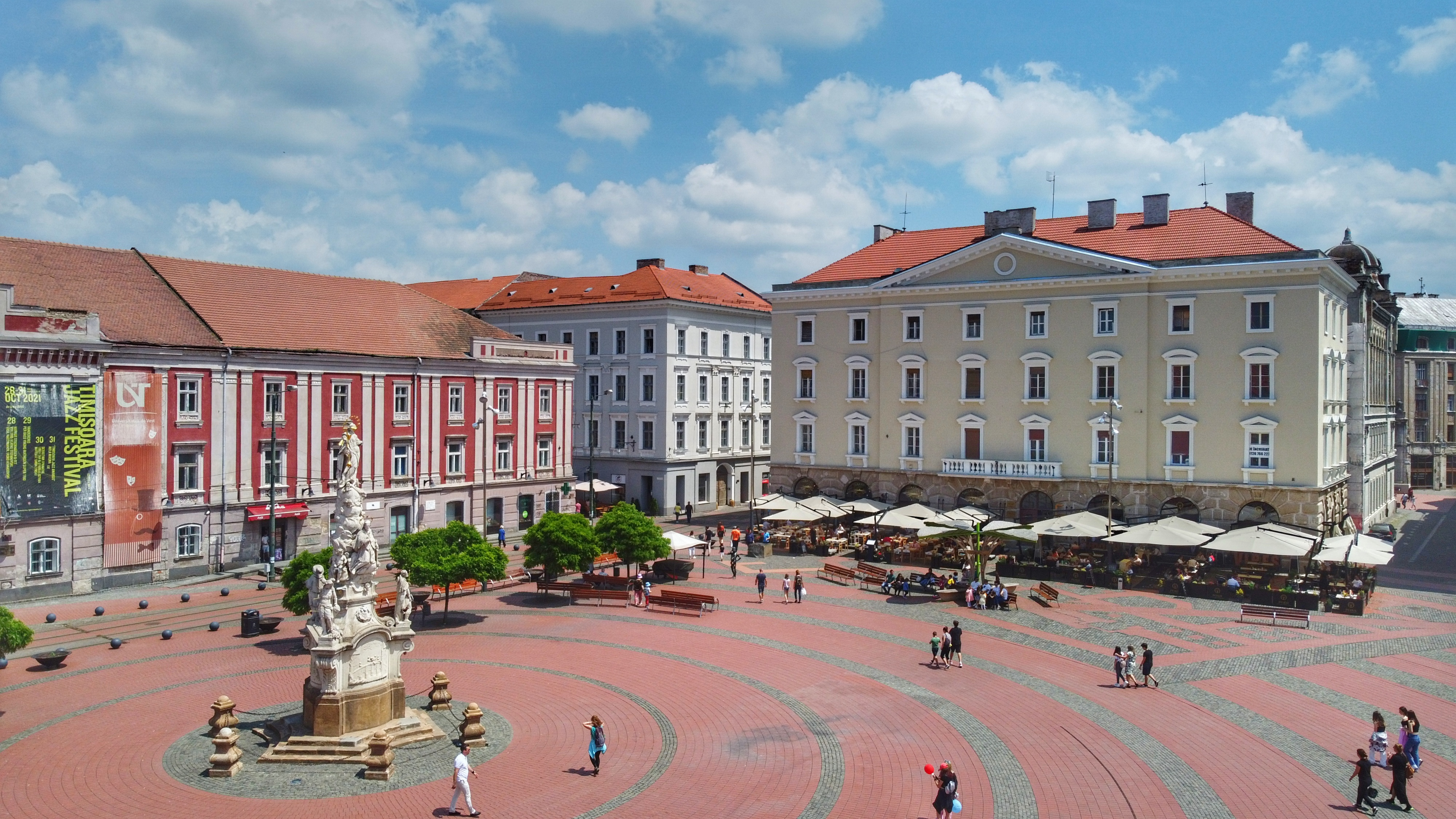
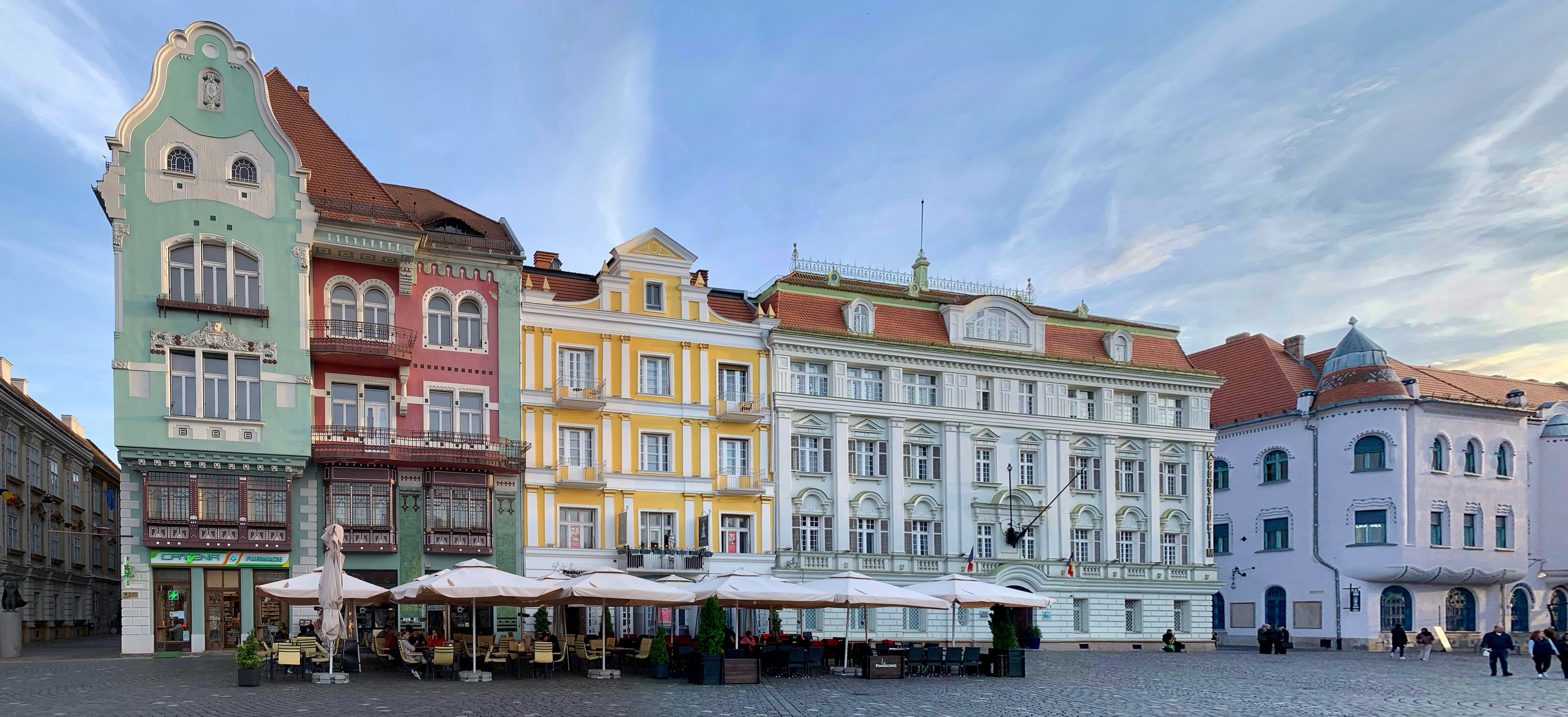
- Victory Square and the Metropolitan Cathedral Roses Park and the Bega St. George Cathedral Romanian National Opera Liberty Square Union Square with the Brück House on the left

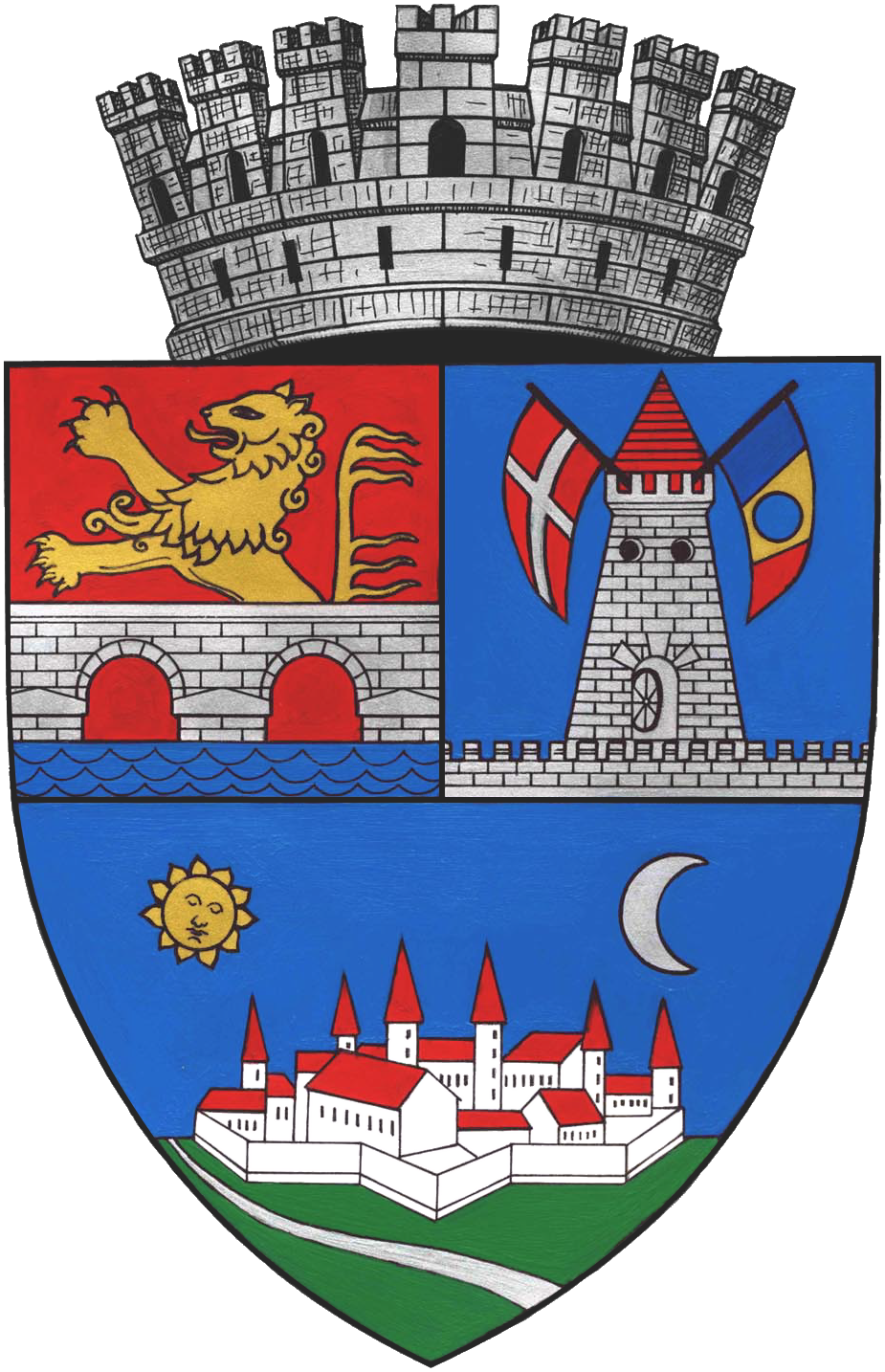
- Flag Coat of arms
- Nicknames: Mica Vienă (Little Vienna), City of Roses, City of Parks, Garden City
- Location in Timiș County
- Interactive map of Timișoara
- Location within Romania Location within Europe
- Coordinates: 45°45′35″N 21°13′48″E
- Country: Romania
- Historic land: Banat
- Development region: Vest
- Euroregion: Danube–Criș–Mureș–Tisa
- County: Timiș
- Status: County seat
- First official record: 1212 (as castrum regium Themes)

Government
  - Mayor (2024–2028): Dominic Fritz (USR)
  - Vice mayor: Ruben Lațcău (USR); Paula Romocean (USR)

Area
  - Municipality: 130.03 km^{2} (50.20 sq mi)
  - Metro: 1,080.31 km^{2} (417.11 sq mi)
- Elevation: 90 m (300 ft)

Population (2026)
  - Municipality: 291,424
  - Rank: 4th
  - Density: 2,241.2/km^{2} (5,804.7/sq mi)
  - Metro: 430,071
- Demonyms: timișorean, timișoreancă (ro)
- Time zone: UTC+2 (EET)
  - Summer (DST): UTC+3 (EEST)
- Postal code: 300xyz^{1}
- Tel. code: +40 x56^{2}
- Car plates: TM
- International airport: Timișoara Traian Vuia International Airport (TSR)
- Climate: Cfb
- Website: www.primariatm.ro
- ^{1}x, y and z are digits that indicate the street, part of the street or even the building of the address^{2}x is a digit indicating the operator: 2 for the former national operator, Romtelecom, and 3 for other ground telephone networks

Timișoara (UK: /ˌtɪmɪˈʃwɑːrə/, US: /ˌtiːmiː-/, Romanian: [timiˈʃo̯ara]; (Note: German: Temeswar [ˈtɛmɛʃvaːɐ̯], also Temeschwar or Temeschburg; Hungarian: Temesvár [ˈtɛmɛʃvaːr]; Serbian: Темишвар, romanized: Temišvar [ˈtěmiʃʋaːr]) see other names), officially the Municipality of Timișoara, is the capital city of Timiș County, Banat, and the main economic, social and cultural center in western Romania. Located on the Bega River, Timișoara is considered the informal capital city of the historical Banat region. From 1848 to 1860 it was the capital of the Serbian Vojvodina and the Voivodeship of Serbia and Banat of Temeschwar. With 250,849 inhabitants at the 2021 census, Timișoara is the country's fifth most populous city. It is home to around 400,000 inhabitants in its metropolitan area, while the Timișoara–Arad metropolis concentrates more than 70% of the population of Timiș and Arad counties. Timișoara is a multicultural city, home to 21 ethnic groups and 18 religious denominations. Historically, the most numerous were the Swabian Germans, Jews and Hungarians, who still make up 6% of the population in Timișoara.

Conquered in 1716 by the Austrians from the Ottoman Turks, Timișoara developed in the following centuries behind the fortifications and in the urban nuclei located around them. During the second half of the 19th century, the fortress began to lose its usefulness, due to many developments in military technology. Former bastions and military spaces were demolished and replaced with new boulevards and neighborhoods. Timișoara was the first city in the Habsburg monarchy with street lighting (1760) and the first European city to be lit by electric street lamps in 1884. It opened the first public lending library in the Habsburg monarchy and built a municipal hospital 24 years ahead of Vienna. Also, in 1771 it published the first German newspaper in Southeast Europe (Temeswarer Nachrichten). In December 1989, Timișoara was the starting point of the Romanian Revolution.

Timișoara is one of the most important educational centers in Romania, with about 40,000 students enrolled in the city's six universities. Like many other large cities in Romania, Timișoara is a medical tourism service provider, especially for dental care and cosmetic surgery. Several breakthroughs in Romanian medicine have been achieved in Timișoara, including the first in vitro fertilization (IVF), the first laser heart surgery and the first stem cell transplant. As a technology hub, the city has one of the most powerful IT sectors in Romania alongside Bucharest, Cluj-Napoca, Iași, and Brașov. In 2013, Timișoara had the fastest internet download speed in the world.

Nicknamed the "Little Vienna" or the "City of Roses", Timișoara is noted for its large number of historical monuments and its 36 parks and green spaces. The spa resorts Buziaș and Băile Călacea are located at a distance of 30 and 27 km (19 and 17 miles) from the city, respectively, mentioned since Roman times for the properties of healing waters. Along with Oradea, Timișoara is part of the Art Nouveau European Route. It is also a member of Eurocities. Timișoara has an active cultural scene due to the city's three state theaters, opera, philharmonic and many other cultural institutions. In 2016, Timișoara was the first Romanian Youth Capital, and in 2023 it held the title of European Capital of Culture, along with the cities of Veszprém in Hungary and Elefsina in Greece.

== Etymology ==
The Hungarian name of the city, Temesvár, was first recorded as Temeswar in 1315. It refers to a castle (vár) on the Timiș River (Temes). Timiș belongs to the family of hydronyms derived from the Indo-European radical thib 'swamp'. The Romanian and German oikonyms (Timișoara and Temeschburg, respectively) derived from the Hungarian form. The Ottoman administration used Temeşvar which was derived from Temesvár. The Habsburg/Austrian authorities also used Temeschwar, Temeswar or Temeschburg, names that have become commonplace in current usage. The name of the city comes from the river which passes the city, Timișul Mic (German: Kleine Temesch; Hungarian: Kistemes), hydronym which was in use until the 18th century when it was changed to Bega or Beghei.

Names in various languages
- Albanian: Temishvari
- Banat Bulgarian: Timišvár
- Banat Swabian: Temeschwar
- Bosnian: Temišvar
- Croatian: Temišvar
- Czech: Temešvár or Temešov
- Dutch: Temeswaar
- French: Temesbourg
- Greek: Τιμισοάρα, romanized: Timisoára
- Italian: Temesburgo
- Latin: Timisvaria
- Ottoman Turkish: تمشوار, romanized: Temešvār
- Polish: Temeszwar
- Russian: Темешвар, romanized: Temeshvar
- Serbian: Темишвар, romanized: Temišvar
- Slovak: Temešvár
- Slovene: Temišvar
- Turkish: Temeşvar or Tamışvar
- Ukrainian: Темешвар, romanized: Temeshvar
- Yiddish: טעמעשוואַר, romanized: Temeshvar

== History ==
Historical affiliations

Kingdom of Hungary (1212–1526)
Eastern Hungarian Kingdom (1526–1551)
Kingdom of Hungary (1551–1552)
Ottoman Empire (1552–1716)
Habsburg Monarchy (1718–1779)
Kingdom of Hungary (1779–1849)
Austrian Empire (1849–1867)
Austria-Hungary (1867–1918) (de jure Hungary until 1920)
Banat Republic (1918) (de facto)
Kingdom of Serbia (1918) (de facto)
Kingdom of Yugoslavia (1918–1919) (de facto)
Kingdom of Romania (1920–1947) (de facto from 1919)
Romanian People's Republic (1947–1965)
Socialist Republic of Romania (1965–1989)
Romania (1989–present)

=== Early history ===
The southeastern part of the Pannonian Basin is bounded by the Mureș, the Tisza and the Danube; the region was very fertile and already offered favorable conditions for food and human livelihood in 4000 BC. Archeological remains attested the presence of a population of farmers, hunters and artisans, whose existence was favored by mild climate, fertile soil and abundant water and forests.

The first identifiable civilization in Banat were the Dacians who left traces of their past. Several Romanian historians have advanced the idea that the current location of Timișoara corresponds to the Dacian settlement of Zurobara. Although its location is unknown, the coordinates given by geographer Ptolemy in Geographike Hyphegesis place it in the northwest of Banat.

=== Middle Ages ===
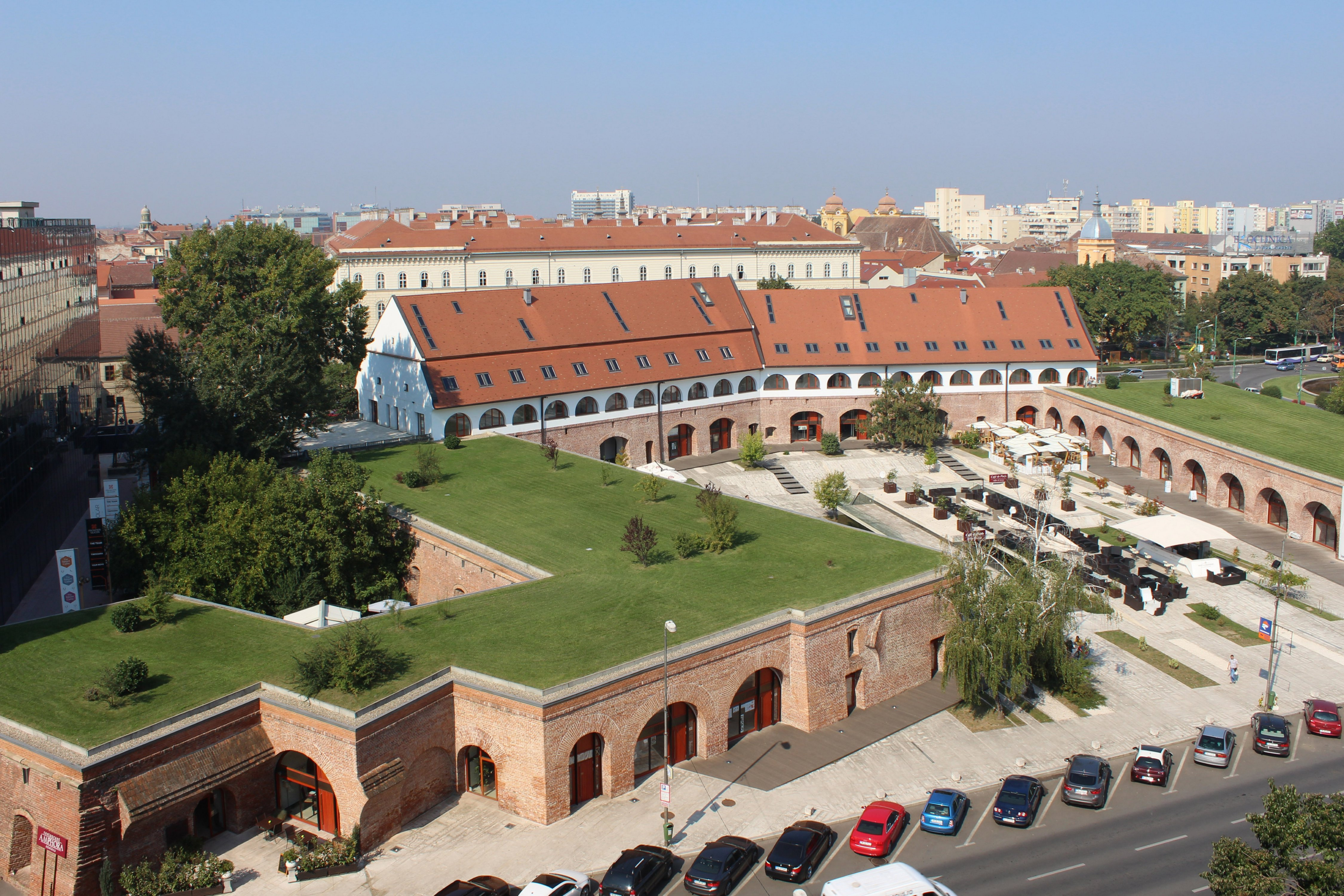
The Theresia Bastion served as a defensive wall of the Timișoara Fortress.

It is assumed that in the 9th century, Knyaz Glad ruled over these lands, accepting Hungarian sovereignty, though no contemporary accounts exist. Timișoara was first officially mentioned in 1212 as the Roman castrum Temesiensis or castrum regium Themes. This year is disputed by historians of the opinion that the city's first documentary mention comes from 1266, when heir apparent Stephen V of Hungary donates part of the Tymes fortress, built by his father, Béla IV, to Count Parabuch. The city was destroyed by the Tatars in the 13th century, but the city was rebuilt and grew considerably during the reign of Charles I of Hungary, who, upon his visit there in 1307, ordered the strengthening of the fortress with stone walls and the building of a royal palace. The palace was built by Italian craftsmen and was organized around a rectangular court having a main body provided with a dungeon or a tower. He even moved the royal seat from Buda to Timișoara between 1316 and 1323. Timișoara's importance also grew due to its strategic location, which facilitated control over the Banat plain.

By the middle of the 14th century, Timișoara was at the forefront of Western Christendom's battle against the Muslim Ottoman Turks. In 1394, the Turks led by Bayezid I passed Nagybecskerek (present-day Zrenjanin) and Timișoara on their way to Wallachia where they were defeated by Voivode Mircea the Elder in the battle of Rovine. Timișoara once again served as a concentration point for the Christian armed forces, this time for the battle of Nicopolis. After the Christians' defeat, the Ottomans devastated Banat to Timișoara, from where they were expelled by Count István Losonczy. Appointed Count of Timiș in 1440, John Hunyadi moved with his family to Timișoara, which he would turn into a permanent military camp. John Hunyadi would come to be known throughout the region for his victory in Belgrade over the Ottomans, considered at that time a defender of Christianity. An important event in the city's history was the peasant uprising led by György Dózsa. On 10 August 1514 he tried to change the course of Bega River to be able to enter more easily into the city, but he was defeated by attacks from both inside and outside the city.

=== Ottoman rule (1552–1716) ===
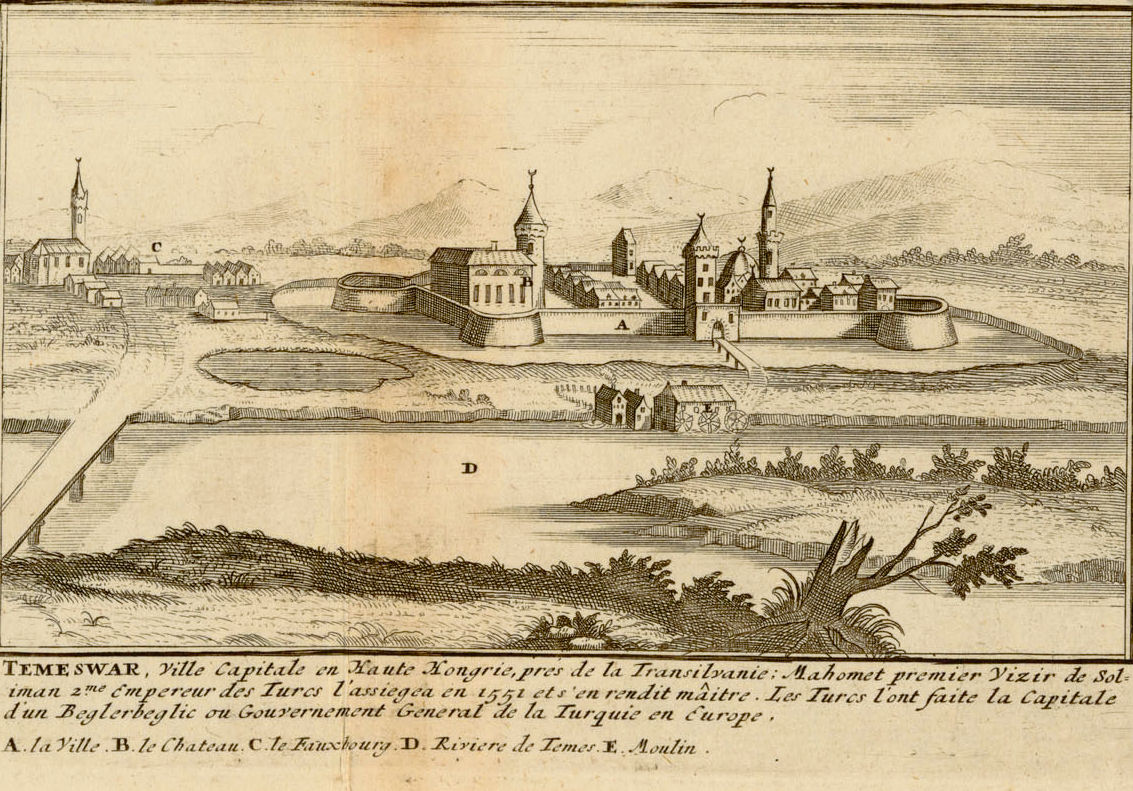
Timișoara in 1656, a map by Nicolas Sanson. Note the mosques with minarets and crescent moons on towers characteristic of cities during the Ottoman era.

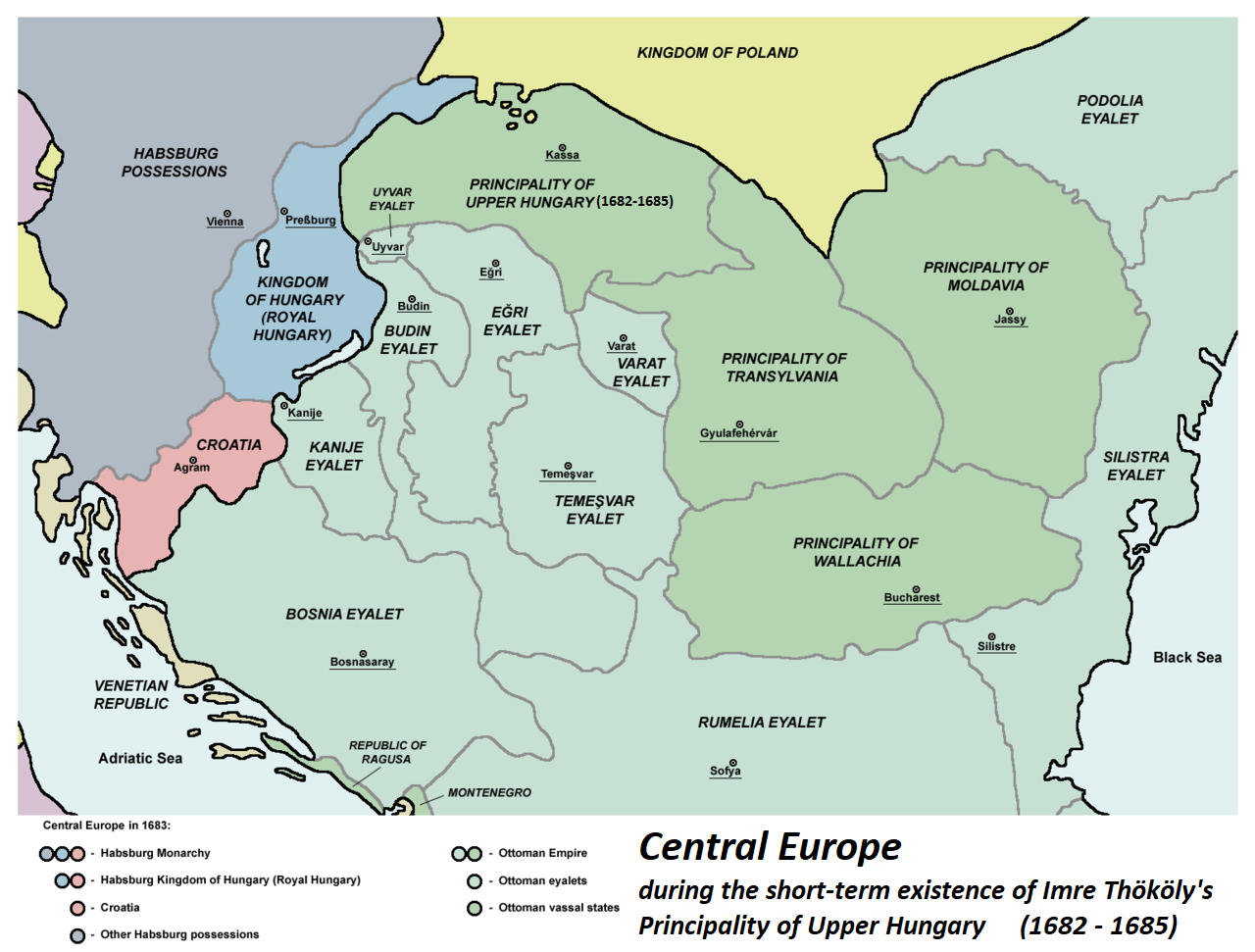
Temeşvar Eyalet and the surrounding Ottoman Hungary in 1683

The fall of Belgrade in 1521 and the defeat at Mohács in 1526 caused the division of the Hungarian Kingdom in three parts, and Banat became the object of contention between the Habsburg Kingdom of Hungary and Ottomans. After a failed siege in 1551, the Turks regrouped and returned with a new strategy. On 22 July 1552, a 160,000-strong army led by Kara Ahmed Pasha conquered the city and transformed it into a provincial capital in the newly established province of (Temeşvar Eyalet). The Eyalet included most of Banat and southern Crișana. Local military commander, István Losonczy, and other Christians were massacred on 27 July 1552 while escaping the city through the Azapilor Gate. After the death of John Zápolya, Habsburgs tried to obtain Transylvania and Banat, including Timișoara, with mixed results; Transylvania even entered into dual vassalage for a time.

Timișoara remained under the Ottoman rule for 164 years, controlled directly by the Sultan and enjoying a special status, similar to other cities in the region, such as Budapest and Belgrade. During this period, Timișoara was transformed into an Ottoman fortification, with mosques, minarets, Quran schools, hammams, and bazaars being built. Timișoara became home to a large Islamic community and was predominantly populated by Muslims. The Ottoman period of Timișoara produced famous historical figures, such as Osman Ağa of Temeşvar and Ali of Temeşvar.

Except for a period in the late 16th century, the city did not suffer sieges until the end of the 17th century. In 1594, Gregory Palotić, Ban of Lugos and Karánsebes, started an anti-Ottoman uprising in Banat, with its starting point in Nagybecskerek. Following a strong Transylvanian offensive led by György Borbély, the Christian army conquered several towns, but Timișoara remained untouched. Another attempt to retake the city took place in 1596, when an army of Sigismund Báthory began the siege of the city. After 40 days of futile efforts, the besiegers drew back.

=== Habsburg rule (1716–1860) ===
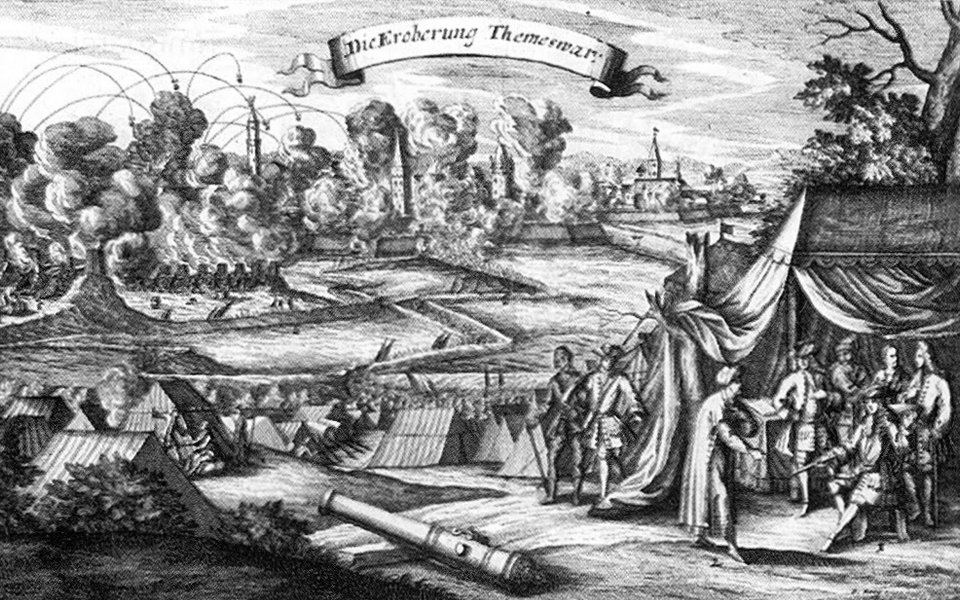
Siege of 1716

After the victory at Petrovaradin on 5 August 1716, the Austrian army led by Prince Eugene of Savoy decided to conquer Timișoara. The Ottoman military, the kuruc and the Turkish civilian population were forced to leave the city after a 48-day siege marked by repeated bombings that destroyed much of the city's buildings. After the Treaty of Passarowitz (1718), the Banat of Temeswar became the province of the Habsburg monarchy under the German name of Temeschburg and was proclaimed a "possession of the Crown", with a military administration which ruled it until 1751 when it was replaced by a civil one.

After the conquest of Banat, the imperial authorities in Vienna began an extensive process of colonization, inviting especially German Catholics from Württemberg, Swabia, Nassau, etc. who would become known as Banat Swabians. In Temeschburg, the Swabians settled mainly in Fabric, where they strongly developed craftsmanship. The main function of the town during this period was as a military fortress. The existing fortifications could not cope with the new military techniques, so the entire fortress was rebuilt in a late, flat and inconsistent adaptation of the Vauban style. It had an area ten times greater than the medieval Turkish fortress. Between 1728 and 1732, the Bega River was regulated into a navigable canal.

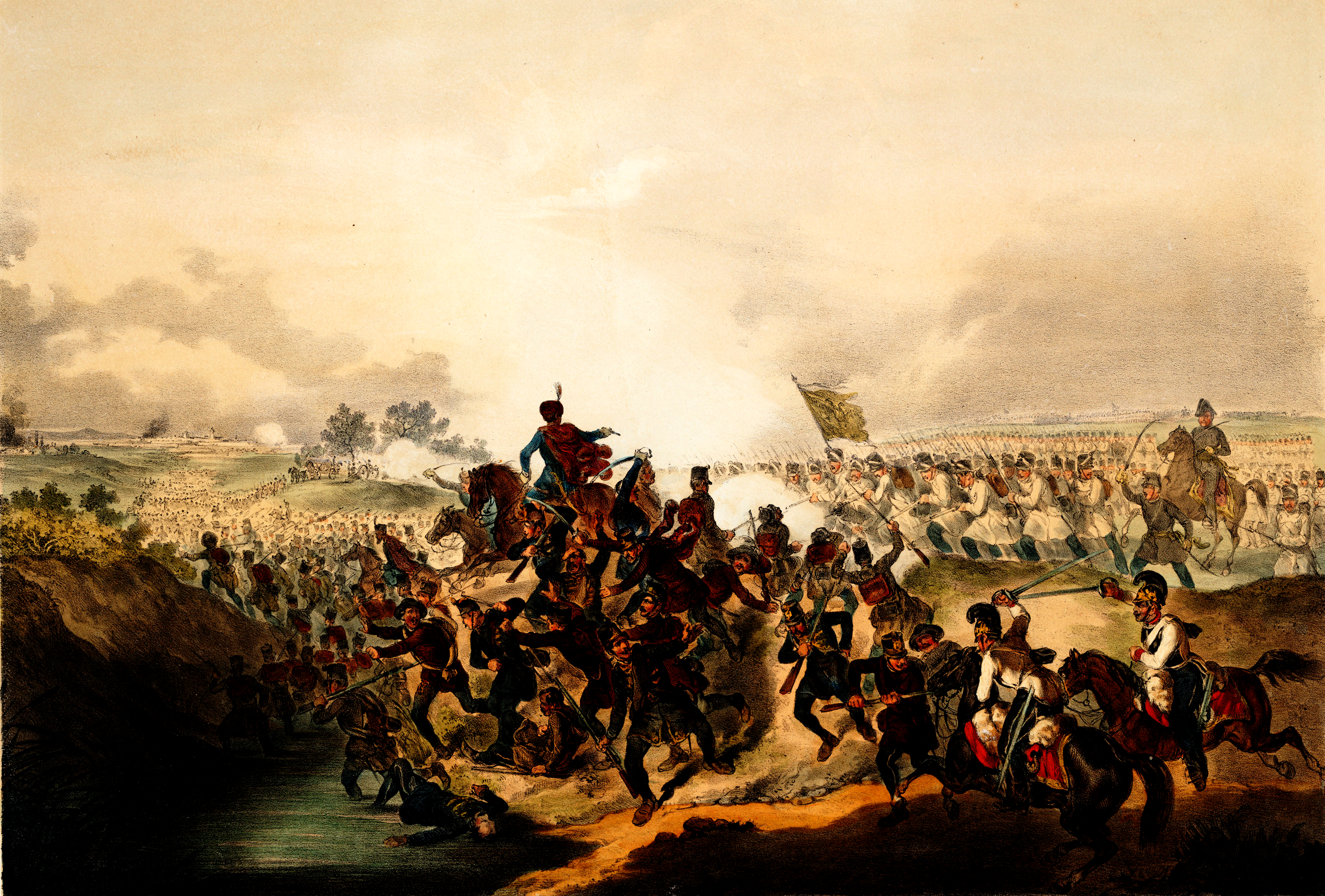
Battle of Temesvár (1849) at the end of a 107-day siege

Under the political pressure of the Hungarian Diet, the Viennese Imperial Court agreed that the three counties of Banat should be reincorporated into the Hungarian Kingdom, in 1779. In 1781 Joseph II, Holy Roman Emperor declared Temeschburg free from the county authority and, to prevent the nobles from interfering with the administration of the city, he raised it to the rank of a "free royal city". This status would secure the town's internal self-government, raising and spending its own local taxes, and electing representatives in the Diet. The city was under siege in 1848 for 107 days. The Hungarians unsuccessfully tried to capture the fortress in the battle of Temesvár. It was the last major battle in the Hungarian Revolution of 1848. By the March Constitution, the region was incorporated to the Voivodeship of Serbia and Banat of Temeschwar, which became a crownland of the Austrian Empire. The new imperial province, the existence of which had also been consecrated by the imperial decree of 18 November 1849, was ruled both militarily and civilly. Timișoara was designated as the residence of the governor, and the city maintained its privileges as a free royal city.

=== 19th–20th centuries ===
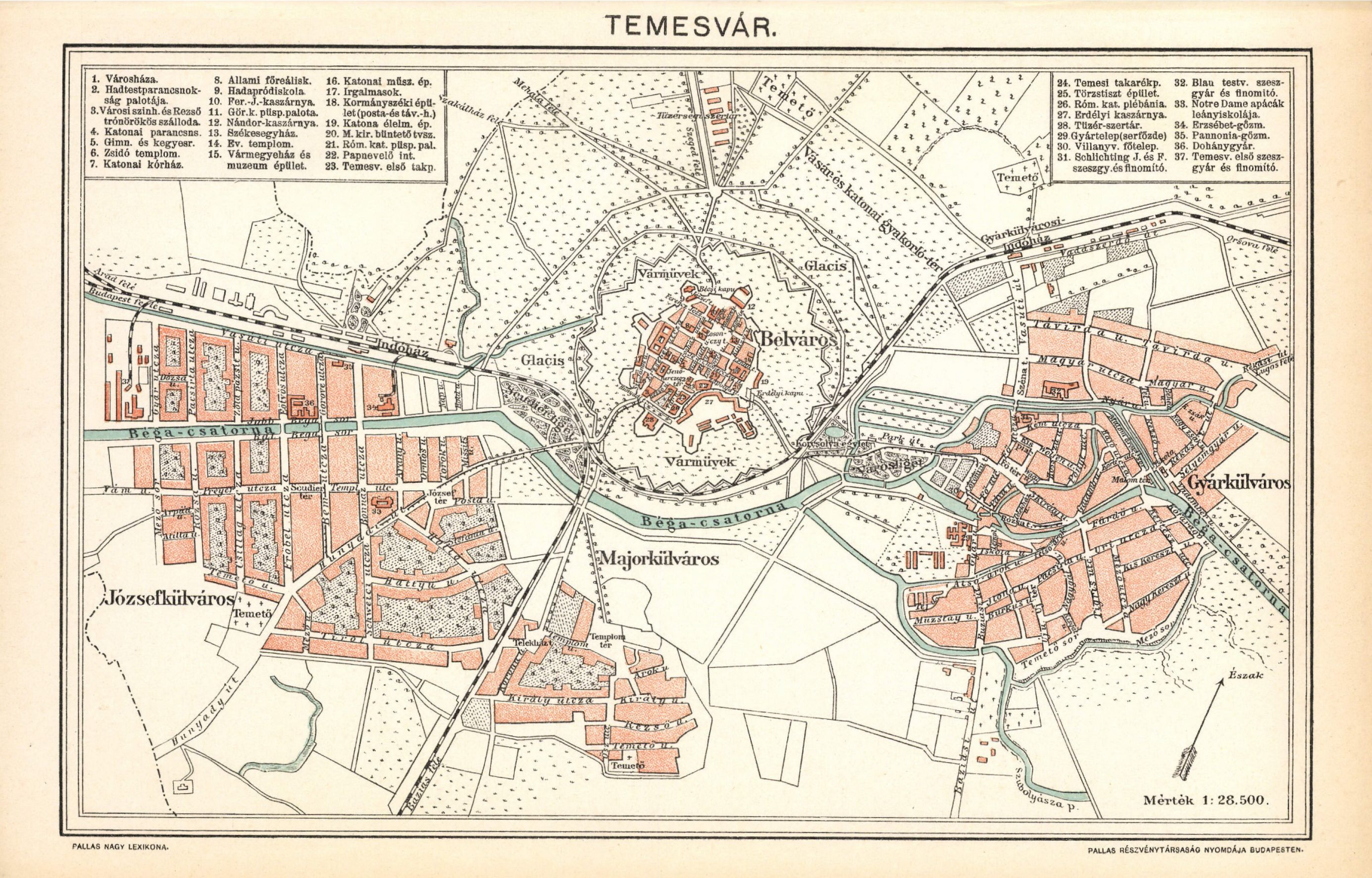
A Hungarian-language map of late-19th century Timișoara with the four historical districts: Cetate (Belváros), Fabric (Gyárkülváros), Elisabetin (Majorkülváros) and Iosefin (Józsefkülváros)

In 1860, the Voivodeship of Serbia and Banat of Temeschwar was abolished and most of its territory was incorporated into the Habsburg Kingdom of Hungary, although direct Hungarian rule began only following the Austro-Hungarian Compromise of 1867, after the establishment of the dual monarchy. As part of Austria-Hungary, the city experienced a fast economic and demographic growth. Credit institutions invested large sums in the development of local industry; at the turn of the 20th century there were many enterprises here: two breweries, an iron foundry, a match factory, a brick factory, a gas factory, a chain factory, a hat factory, a chocolate factory, etc. In this period horse-drawn tram, telephone and street lighting were introduced and roads were paved.

In 1892, Emperor Franz Joseph I decided to abolish the fortress status of Timișoara. The demolition of the fortifications began in 1899. The main functions of the city thus became the economic ones, especially the commercial and banking ones.

=== After World War I ===
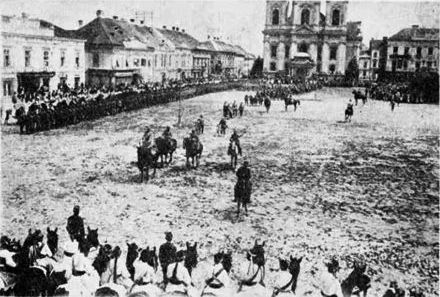
Romanian troops entering Timișoara on 3 August 1919

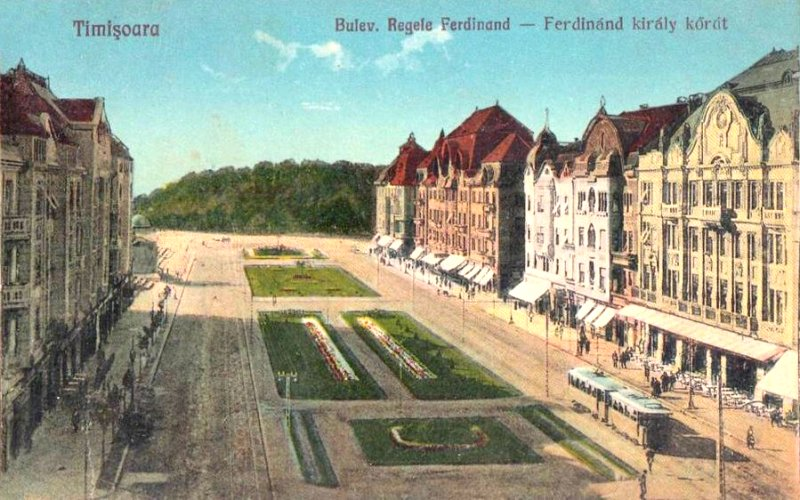
King Ferdinand Boulevard (now Victory Square) in 1926

On 31 October 1918, local military and political elites established the Banat National Council, together with representatives of the region's main ethnic groups: Germans, Hungarians, Serbs and Romanians. On 1 November, they proclaimed the short-lived Banat Republic. In the aftermath of World War I, the Banat region was divided between the Kingdom of Romania and the Kingdom of Serbs, Croats and Slovenes, and Timișoara came under Romanian administration after Serbian occupation between 1918 and 1919. The city was ceded from Hungary to Romania by the Treaty of Trianon on 4 June 1920. In 1920, King Ferdinand I awarded Timișoara the status of a University Center, and the interwar years saw continuous economic and cultural development. A number of anti-fascist and anti-revisionist demonstrations also took place during this time.

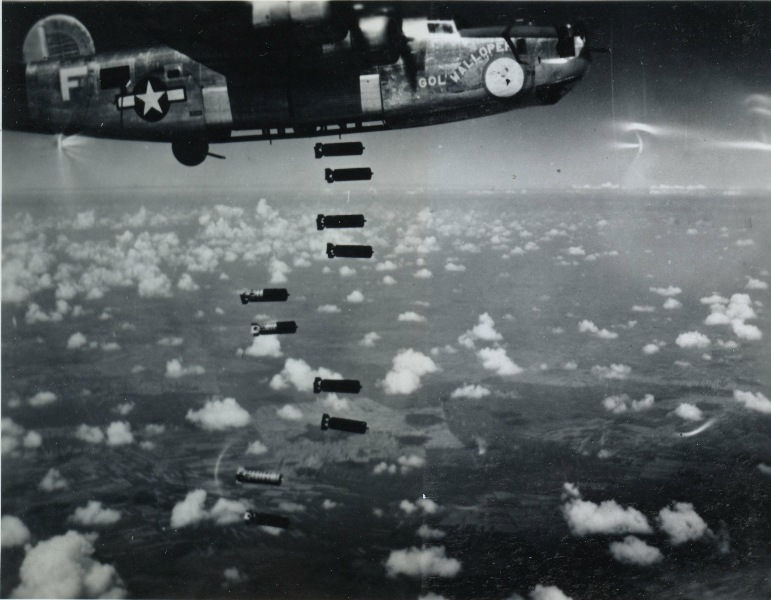
A B-24 Gol'Walloper dropping bombs over Timișoara on 3 July 1944

During World War II, Timișoara suffered damage from both Allied and Axis bombing raids, especially during the second half of 1944. On 23 August 1944, Romania, which until then was a member of the Axis, declared war on Nazi Germany and joined the Allies. The German and Hungarian troops attempted to take the city by force throughout September, but without success.

After the war, the People's Republic of Romania was proclaimed, and Timișoara underwent Sovietisation and, later, Systematisation. The city's population tripled between 1948 and 1992. Timișoara became highly industrialized both through new investments and by increasing the capacities of the old enterprises in various industries: machine building, textile and footwear, electrical, food, plastics, optical, building materials, furniture, etc.

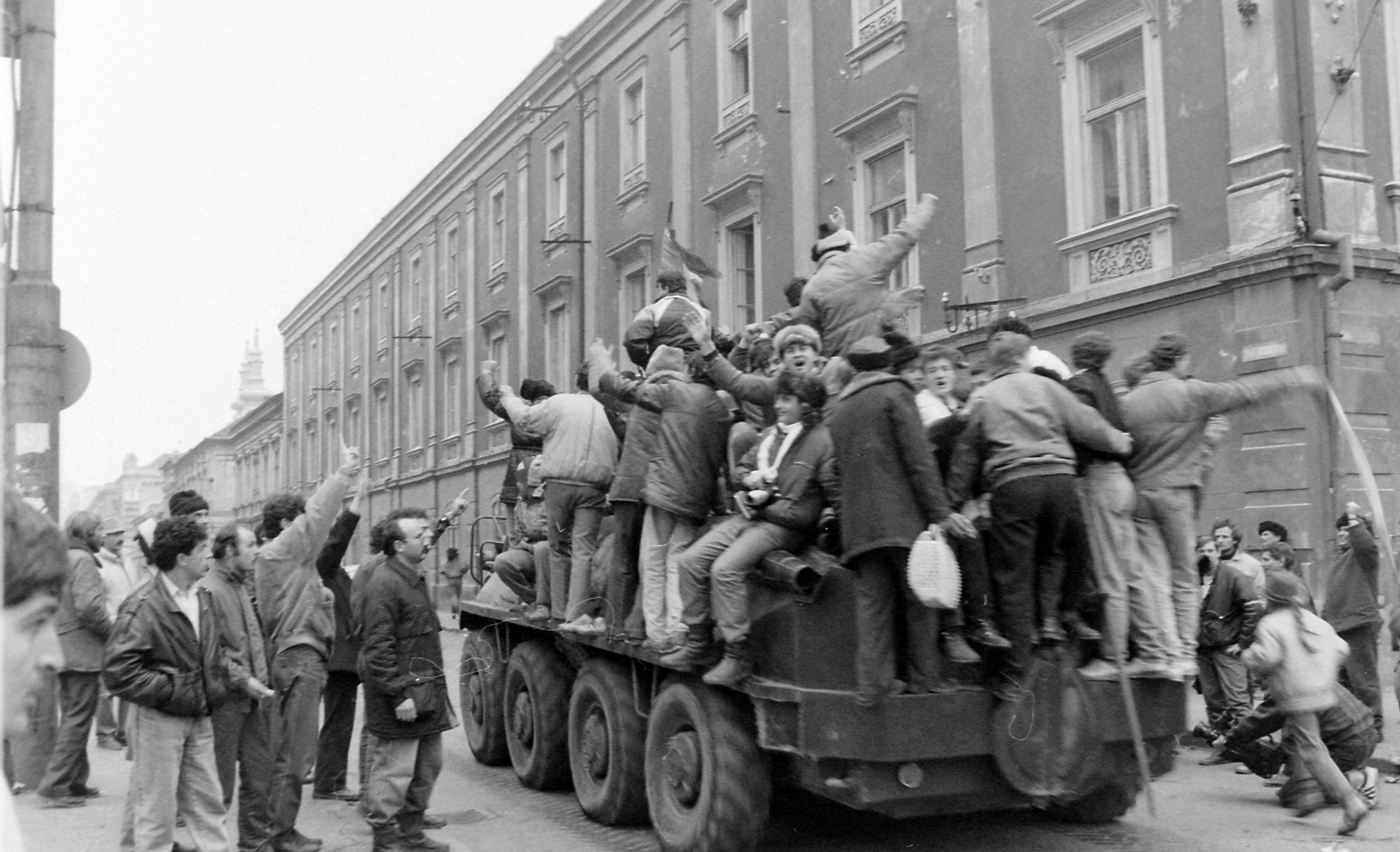
Protesters on Emanoil Ungureanu Street during the 1989 Revolution

In December 1989, Timișoara witnessed a series of mass street protests in what was to become the Romanian Revolution. On 20 December, three days after bloodshed began there, Timișoara was declared the first city free of Communism in Romania.

== Geography ==
Timișoara is located at the intersection of the 45th parallel north with the 21st meridian east. As a mathematical position, it is in the Northern Hemisphere, almost equally distant from the North Pole and the equator, and in the Eastern Hemisphere, using Central European Time. The local time of the city (considered after the meridian) is 1 h 25' 8" ahead of the Greenwich Mean Time, but it is 34' 52" behind the official time of Romania (Eastern European Time).

Timișoara lies at an altitude of 90 meters on the southeast edge of the Banat Plain, part of the Pannonian Plain, near the divergence of the Timiș and Bega rivers. The waters of the two rivers form a swampy and frequently flooded land. Timișoara developed on one of few places where the swamps could be crossed. These constituted a natural protection around the fortress for a very long time and favored a wet and insalubrious climate, which spread plague and cholera and kept the number of inhabitants relatively low, preventing civic development. With time, these rivers were drained, dammed and diverted. Due to the hydrographical projects undertaken in the 18th century, the city no longer lies on the Timiș River, but on the Bega Canal. This improvement of the land was made irreversible by building the Bega Canal (started in 1728) and by the complete draining of the surrounding marshes. The city lies only 0.5 to 5 meters above the water table, which disallows the construction of tall buildings. The rich black soil and relatively high water table make this a fertile agricultural region.

Taken as a whole, the relief of Timișoara appears as a relatively flat, monotonous surface, the smoothness of the surface interrupted only by the Bega riverbed. Researched in detail, the relief of the city and its surroundings presents a series of local peculiarities, represented mainly by deserted meanders, micro-depressions and ridges (generally made of coarse materials). These are the result of the deposits in the area of the Timiș and Bega rivers, before their drainage, regularization and damming (concretized altimetrically by modest bumps, which do not exceed anywhere, the interval of 2–3 m).

=== Seismicity ===
Timișoara is a fairly active seismic center, but of the many earthquakes observed, few have exceeded magnitude 6 on the Richter scale. There are two active seismic faults that cross the western part of the city. The earthquakes recorded in the region are normal earthquakes, of crustal type, with depths of foci between 5 and 30 km (3.1 and 18.6 mi).

=== Flora and fauna ===
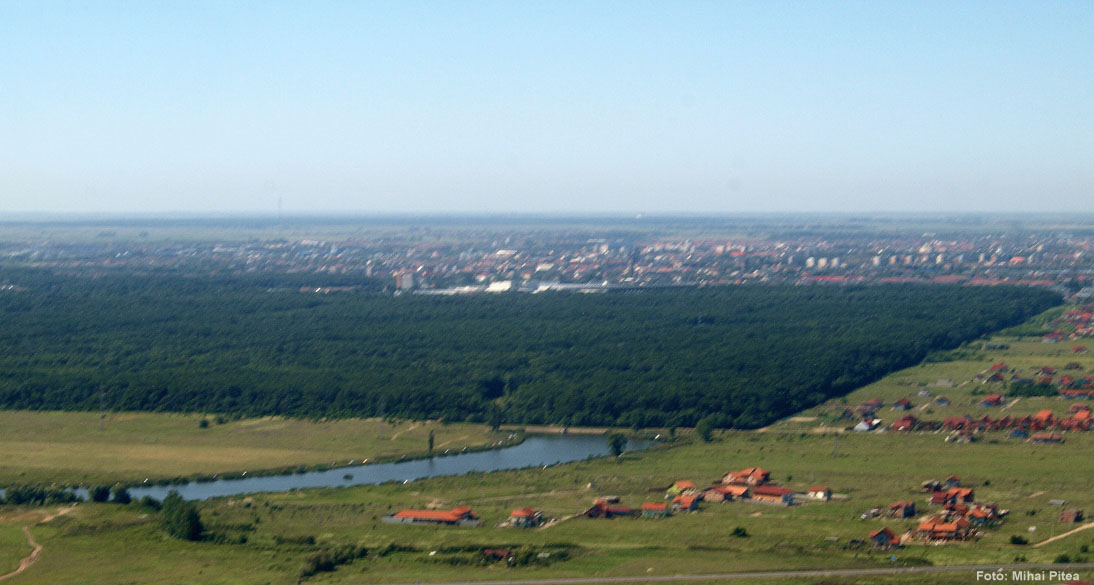
Green Forest and Dumbrăvița Lake

In the past, there were extensive oak forests between the Tisza and Timiș. Over time, they were cleared to obtain the wood needed to build the fortress and houses, as well as to gain arable land. Today, except for the areas forested with Turkey oak and Hungarian oak (Green Forest, Bistra Forest, Timișeni–Șag Forest), the territory falls within the anthropogenic forest steppe that characterizes the entire Pannonian Basin. The landscape is diversified by meadow vegetation, along the main rivers, in which softwood trees predominate: willows, poplars, alders. Within the city limits is the Green Forest (Romanian: Pădurea Verde), a forest massif with an area of about 724 ha (1,790 acres), systematically arranged in squares of 15 ha (37 acres). The forest is man-made; first organization plans were carried out in 1860 by the Hungarian Forest Service. About 20 km (12 mi) southeast of Timișoara is the Bazoș Dendrological Park, a forest reserve which since 1994 has the status of protected area. The first trees of the reserve were brought in 1909 from the Harvard University nursery. Today, the reserve includes 800 different species of trees and shrubs and is part of the International Association of Botanical Gardens.

The fauna of Timișoara includes few mammals, represented only by a few insectivores and rodents. The birds, on the other hand, are numerous, some of which are of hunting importance (the pheasant). The urban wildlife, although less varied than the forest wildlife, has a higher number of species of hunting interest (rabbit, deer, quail, partridge, pheasant, hedgehog, etc.) and reptiles. In the parks of Timișoara there are hedgehogs, moles, tree frogs and a lot of birds. Regarding the piscifauna, the dominant species is the carp, along with which live breams, bleaks, roaches, zieges, pikes, natural support for sport fishing. Timișoara used to have the only zoo in western Romania, Timișoara Zoological Garden, but it was closed.

=== Hydrography ===
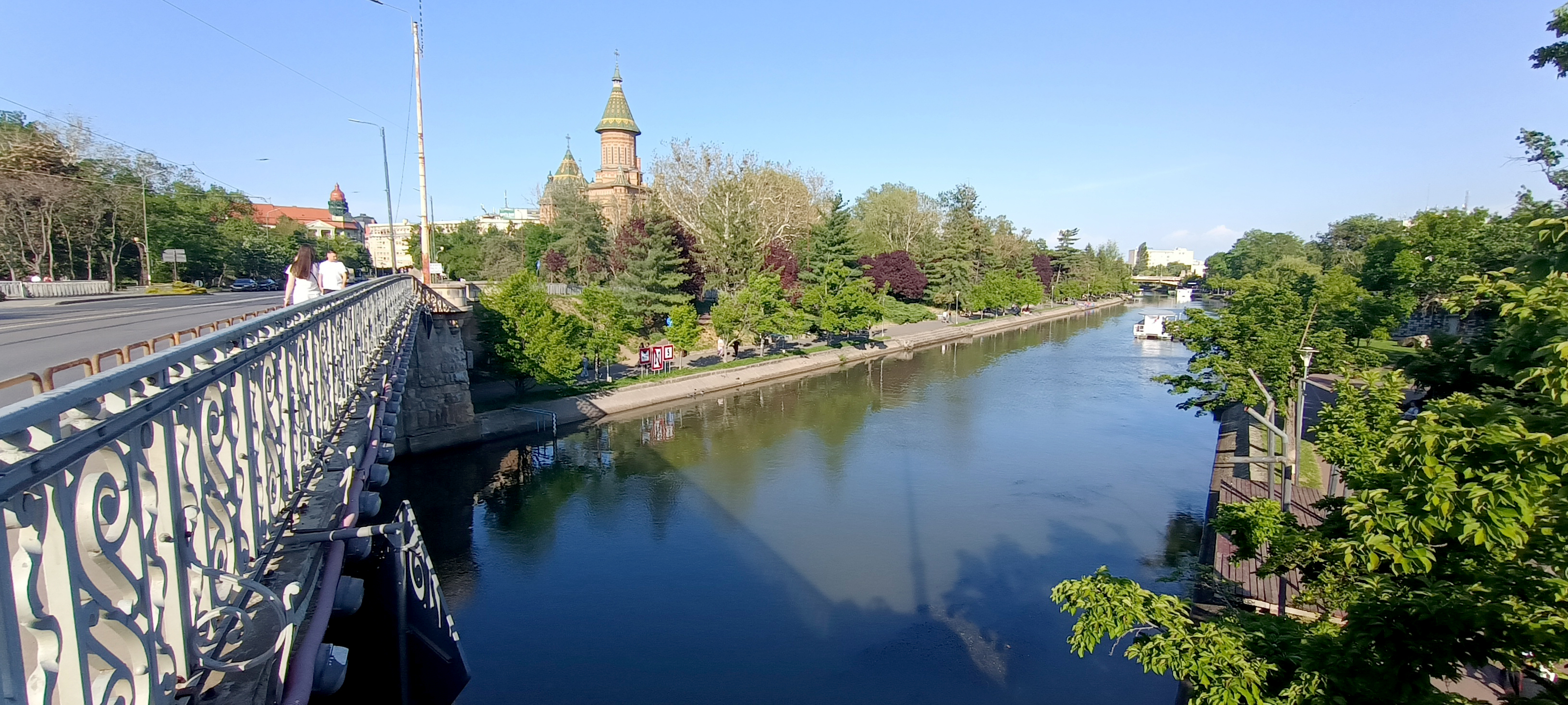
Bega Canal seen from the Mary Bridge

The main watercourse is the Bega River, the southernmost tributary of the Tisza. Springing from the Poiana Ruscă Mountains, Bega is canalized, and from Timișoara to its outflow it was arranged for navigation (115 km [71 mi]). The Bega Canal was built between 1728 and 1760, but its final arrangement was made later. The Bega Canal was designed for the access of barges of 600–700 tons and an annual transport capacity of three million wagons.

From the multitude of arms that existed before the canalization of Bega, only Bega Moartă (Dead Bega; in the Fabric neighborhood) and Bega Veche (Old Bega; to the west, flowing through Săcălaz) are preserved inside the city.

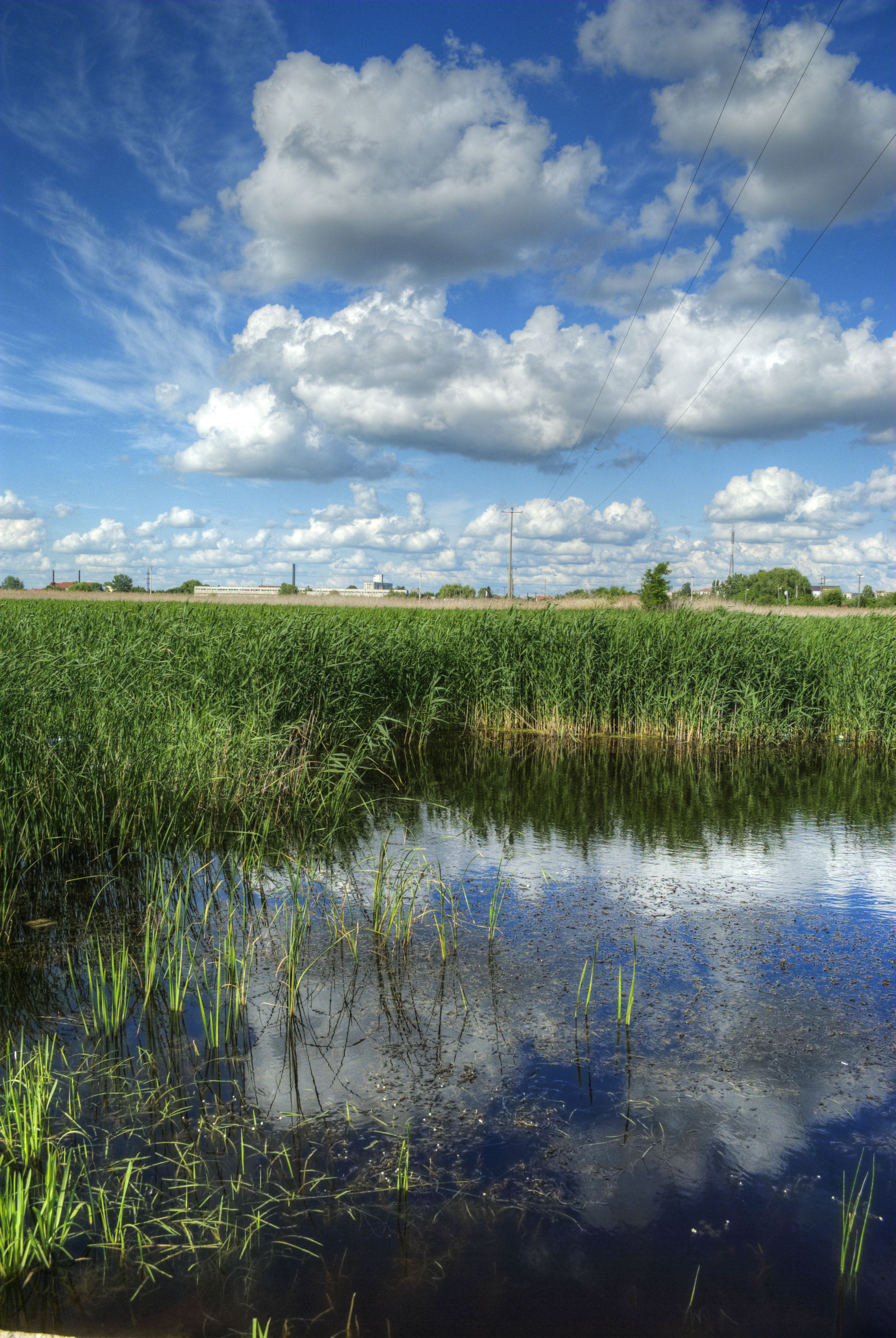
Balta Lămâiței in Freidorf

In addition to permanent courses and those that dry out, often during the summer, on the territory of Timișoara there are a number of lakes: either natural, formed instead of the old meanders or subsidence areas, such as those near Kuncz, Giroc, Pădurea Verde, etc., or of anthropic origin, such as those from Fratelia, Freidorf, Ciarda Roșie, Ștrandul Tineretului, etc. Timișoara's drinking water is provided by Lake Surduc, an anthropic lake (1976), the largest in Timiș County, located 87 km (54 mi) from the city.

=== Climate ===
Like parts of Romania, Timișoara exhibits a transitional humid continental (Köppen: Dfb) and humid subtropical climate (Köppen: Cfa), characteristic of the southeastern part of the Pannonian Basin, with some sub-Mediterranean influences.

The dominant air masses, during spring and summer, are the temperate ones, of oceanic origin, which bring significant precipitations. Frequently, even in winter, humid air masses arrive from the Atlantic, bringing significant rains and snows, less often cold waves. From September to February there are frequent penetrations of continental polar air masses, coming from the east. In Banat, the influence of cyclones and hot air masses from the Adriatic Sea and the Mediterranean Sea is also strongly felt, which in winter generate complete thawing and in summer impose periods of stifling heat.

The average annual temperature was 11.8 °C (53.2 °F) between 1991 and 2020. The warmest month, on average, is July with an average temperature of 22.7 °C (72.9 °F). The coolest month on average is January, with an average temperature of 1.0 °C (33.8 °F). The lowest temperature recorded in Timișoara was −35.3 °C (−31.5 °F), on 24 January 1963, while the highest temperature was 42 °C (108 °F), recorded in August 2017. The average number of frost days (with minimum temperatures below 0 °C [32 °F]) is 80, and the average number of winter days (with maximum temperatures below 0 °C) is 17. The average number of tropical days (with maximum temperatures above 30 °C [86 °F]) is 45.

Predominantly under the influence of the maritime air masses from the northwest, Timișoara receives a higher amount of precipitation than the cities in the Wallachian Plain. The average amount of precipitation for the year in Timișoara is 604.4 mm (23.80 in), falling on 87 days. The month with the most precipitation on average is June with 80.8 mm of precipitation. The month with the least precipitation on average is February with an average of 34.2 mm (1.35 in).

Climate data for Timișoara (1991–2020, extremes 1901–present)
Month	Jan	Feb	Mar	Apr	May	Jun	Jul	Aug	Sep	Oct	Nov	Dec	Year
Record high °C (°F)	18.3 (64.9)	21.5 (70.7)	28.2 (82.8)	32.2 (90.0)	35.1 (95.2)	39.2 (102.6)	41.1 (106.0)	41.0 (105.8)	39.7 (103.5)	33.8 (92.8)	27.1 (80.8)	20.2 (68.4)	41.1 (106.0)
Mean daily maximum °C (°F)	3.9 (39.0)	6.8 (44.2)	12.6 (54.7)	18.8 (65.8)	23.7 (74.7)	27.4 (81.3)	29.7 (85.5)	29.9 (85.8)	24.1 (75.4)	18.3 (64.9)	11.5 (52.7)	4.9 (40.8)	17.6 (63.7)
Daily mean °C (°F)	1.0 (33.8)	1.9 (35.4)	6.5 (43.7)	12.2 (54.0)	17.2 (63.0)	20.9 (69.6)	22.7 (72.9)	22.5 (72.5)	17.0 (62.6)	11.5 (52.7)	6.4 (43.5)	1.5 (34.7)	11.8 (53.2)
Mean daily minimum °C (°F)	−3.0 (26.6)	−1.9 (28.6)	1.6 (34.9)	6.4 (43.5)	11.1 (52.0)	14.8 (58.6)	16.3 (61.3)	16.3 (61.3)	12.7 (54.9)	7.1 (44.8)	2.8 (37.0)	−1.3 (29.7)	6.9 (44.4)
Record low °C (°F)	−35.3 (−31.5)	−29.2 (−20.6)	−20.0 (−4.0)	−5.2 (22.6)	−5.0 (23.0)	2.2 (36.0)	5.9 (42.6)	5.0 (41.0)	−1.9 (28.6)	−6.8 (19.8)	−15.4 (4.3)	−24.8 (−12.6)	−35.3 (−31.5)
Average precipitation mm (inches)	35.7 (1.41)	34.2 (1.35)	34.6 (1.36)	48.3 (1.90)	60.5 (2.38)	80.8 (3.18)	59.5 (2.34)	57.7 (2.27)	51.2 (2.02)	50.4 (1.98)	45.2 (1.78)	46.3 (1.82)	604.4 (23.79)
Average precipitation days (≥ 1.0 mm)	6.8	7.0	6.8	7.5	8.6	8.6	7.4	5.7	7.1	6.4	7.0	8.5	87.4
Average relative humidity (%)	90	86	79	73	73	74	73	75	76	81	85	89	80
Mean monthly sunshine hours	74.2	106.5	165.2	208.1	242.9	263.3	282.4	278.8	194.4	161.9	96.3	60.7	2,134.7
Source 1: NOAA, Deutscher Wetterdienst (humidity 1896-1960)
Source 2: National Institute of Statistics (extremes, 1901–2000), Meteomanz (extremes since 2021)

Climate data for Timișoara (1961–1990)
Month	Jan	Feb	Mar	Apr	May	Jun	Jul	Aug	Sep	Oct	Nov	Dec	Year
Mean daily maximum °C (°F)	2.3 (36.1)	5.6 (42.1)	11.9 (53.4)	17.6 (63.7)	22.8 (73.0)	25.7 (78.3)	27.8 (82.0)	27.6 (81.7)	24.0 (75.2)	18.1 (64.6)	10.3 (50.5)	4.2 (39.6)	16.5 (61.7)
Daily mean °C (°F)	−1.6 (29.1)	1.2 (34.2)	5.8 (42.4)	11.2 (52.2)	16.3 (61.3)	19.4 (66.9)	21.1 (70.0)	20.4 (68.7)	16.5 (61.7)	11.0 (51.8)	5.6 (42.1)	0.8 (33.4)	10.6 (51.2)
Mean daily minimum °C (°F)	−4.8 (23.4)	−2.3 (27.9)	1.2 (34.2)	5.8 (42.4)	10.1 (50.2)	13.4 (56.1)	14.6 (58.3)	14.3 (57.7)	11.2 (52.2)	6.2 (43.2)	2.1 (35.8)	−1.7 (28.9)	5.8 (42.5)
Average precipitation mm (inches)	40 (1.6)	36 (1.4)	37 (1.5)	48 (1.9)	65 (2.6)	76 (3.0)	64 (2.5)	50 (2.0)	40 (1.6)	39 (1.5)	48 (1.9)	50 (2.0)	593 (23.5)
Average snowfall cm (inches)	9.8 (3.9)	9.3 (3.7)	4.4 (1.7)	0.0 (0.0)	0.0 (0.0)	0.0 (0.0)	0.0 (0.0)	0.0 (0.0)	0.0 (0.0)	0.0 (0.0)	3.7 (1.5)	7.2 (2.8)	34.4 (13.6)
Average precipitation days (≥ 1.0 mm)	7	7	7	8	9	10	7	6	6	5	8	9	89
Average dew point °C (°F)	−3.3 (26.1)	−1.5 (29.3)	1.5 (34.7)	5.2 (41.4)	10.3 (50.5)	13.4 (56.1)	14.3 (57.7)	14.2 (57.6)	11.5 (52.7)	7.1 (44.8)	2.8 (37.0)	−0.6 (30.9)	6.2 (43.2)
Mean monthly sunshine hours	72.1	92.2	155.4	186.4	242.4	262.3	300.6	280.2	217.5	177.3	86.4	56.9	2,129.7
Source: NOAA NCEI

== Demography ==
Ethnic composition of Timișoara (2021)
1. Romanians (70.4%)
2. Hungarians (3.31%)
3. Serbs (1.10%)
4. Unknown (23.0%)
5. Others (2.23%)
Religious composition of Timișoara (2021)
1. Romanian Orthodox (59.9%)
2. Roman Catholics (6.06%)
3. Pentecostals (1.90%)
4. Baptists (1.25%)
5. Unknown (24.8%)
6. Others (3.75%)
7. Irreligious, atheists and agnostics (2.44%)

Historical population
Year	Pop.	±%
1787	9,479	—
1847	18,103	+91.0%
1869	32,725	+80.8%
1880	33,694	+3.0%
1890	39,884	+18.4%
1900	53,033	+33.0%
1910	72,555	+36.8%
1920	82,689	+14.0%
1930	91,580	+10.8%
1941	110,840	+21.0%
1948	111,987	+1.0%
1956	142,257	+27.0%
1966	174,243	+22.5%
1977	269,353	+54.6%
1992	334,115	+24.0%
2002	317,660	−4.9%
2011	319,279	+0.5%
2021	250,849	−21.4%
Source: Census data, Encyclopædia Britannica Eleventh Edition

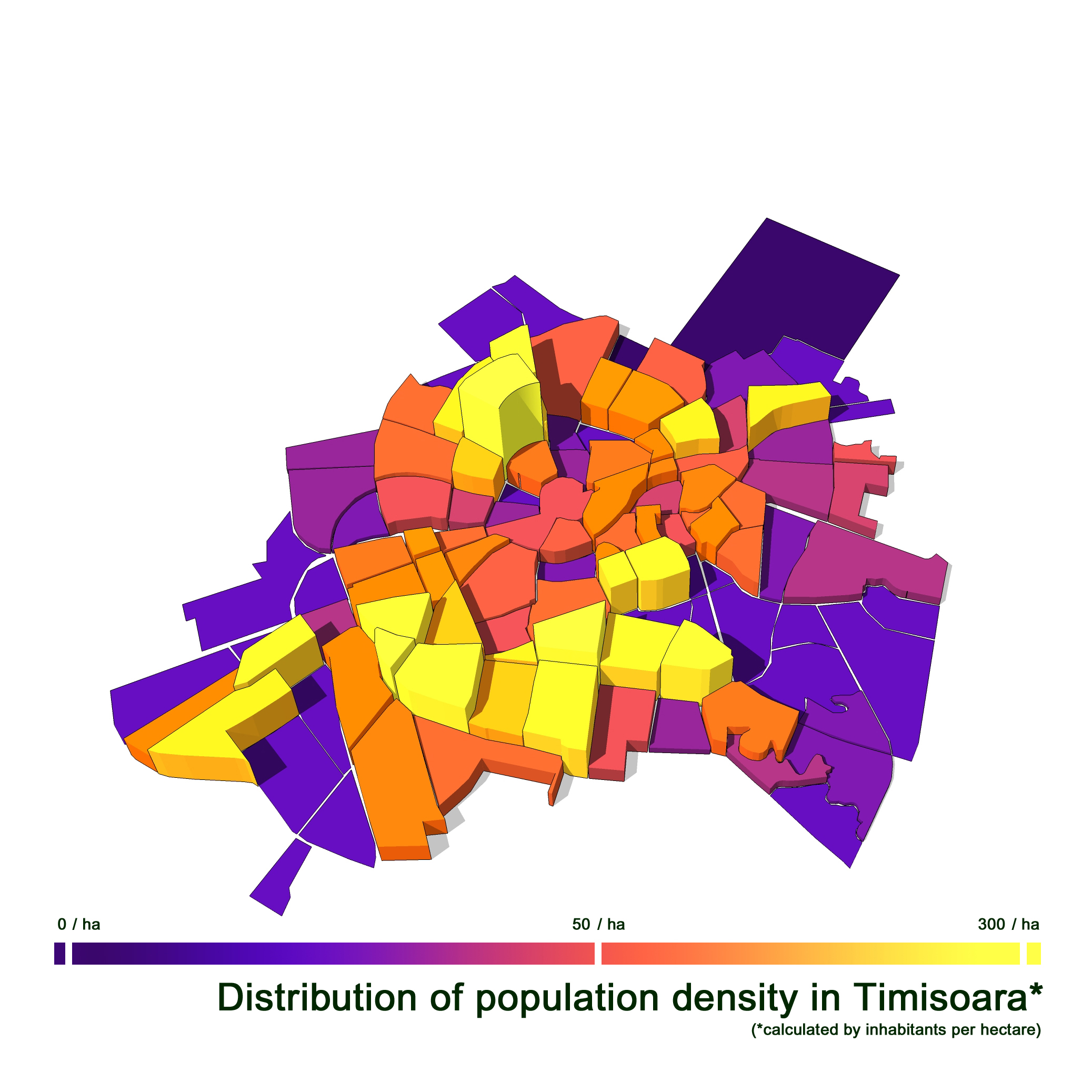
Population density of micro-neighborhoods in 2009

From a demographic point of view, Timișoara is defined, according to the Zipf's law, as a second-tier city, along with Iași, Constanța, Cluj-Napoca and Brașov, with extensive macro-territorial functions and having the second largest functional urban area, after Bucharest, of over 5,000 km^{2} (1,900 sq mi). In 2013, Bucharest and Timișoara were also the only metropolitan European growth areas (MEGAs) in Romania. Nationally, Timișoara has been recognized as the largest polarizing center in western Romania.

According to the 2021 census, the population of Timișoara amounted to 250,849 inhabitants, a decrease compared to the previous census in 2011, when 319,279 inhabitants were registered. However, these figures are questioned by local authorities and sociologists due to the defective way in which the census was conducted. According to the mayor's office and local population records, Timișoara numbers over 309,000 inhabitants as of 2023. The population of the city represents roughly 38% of the population of Timiș County, 15% of the population of the West development region and 1.3% of the total population of Romania. As defined by Eurostat, the Timișoara functional urban area has a population of 364,325 inhabitants (as of 2018).

According to a study conducted by the World Bank, Timișoara was between 2001 and 2011 the regional city in Romania that attracted the highest number of in-migrants. Timișoara serves as an important polarizer of the labor force for other regions of the country, with a demographic surplus, especially for the counties in northern Moldavia, northwestern Transylvania and Oltenia. Timișoara manages to attract about 8,000 new inhabitants annually, most coming mainly from Timiș County, but also from smaller cities in neighboring counties – Caraș-Severin, Hunedoara and Arad. In fact, 46.2% of the current population of Timișoara is made up of people who have moved here from elsewhere. In 2017, the former mayor Nicolae Robu stated that the city of Timișoara has an additional population of over 100,000 people compared to the officially registered residents. This includes students, workers, and other categories of floaters, who are not included in the statistical reports as they no longer acquire a residence visa.

=== Ethnic minorities ===
Timișoara has stood out since ancient times as an ethnically diverse city. In 1910, the largest community was represented by Germans, followed by Hungarians, Romanians, Jews, Serbs and many other smaller communities, such as Czechs, Slovaks, Croats, Romas, Bulgarians, Poles, etc. The figures and percentage ratios are much changed today, but the multiethnic aspect of the city persists. Nowadays, 85% of the inhabitants are Romanians, while the minorities are much more diverse due to the presence of Asians, Italians, Muslims, and fewer Germans and Hungarians. Despite this, Timișoara is the city with the largest population of Germans in Romania. The decline of German and Hungarian communities is mainly due to assimilation (for instance, 64% of Hungarians in Timișoara live in mixed marriages), migration and low birth rates. Timișoara is also home to an important Serb community, which in 2011 numbered almost 5,000 people. Many of them use Serbian as a second language, preferring Romanian. Serbian is more common among older generations educated in it.

In 2018, according to official data, over 7,000 foreigners lived in Timișoara. The actual figure is higher, given that many foreigners living in Timișoara do not apply for permanent residence, while spending most of their time in the city.

Population by ethnic groups under Hungarian and Romanian administration
Census	Total	Romanians	Hungarians	Germans	Jews	Romani	Ukrainians	Serbs	Croats	Czechs	Slovaks	Bulgarians
1880	38,702	5,037 (13.02%)	7,529 (19.45%)	20,518 (53.02%)	—N/a	—N/a	28 (0.07%)	2,415 (6.24%)	—N/a	—N/a	405 (1.05%)	—N/a
1890	45,948	5,594 (12.17%)	11,100 (24.16%)	24,973 (54.35%)	—N/a	—N/a	27 (0.06%)	2,363 (5.14%)	52 (0.11%)	—N/a	332 (0.72%)	—N/a
1900	60,551	6,312 (10.42%)	19,162 (31.65%)	30,892 (51.02%)	—N/a	—N/a	13 (0.02%)	2,730 (4.51%)	130 (0.21%)	—N/a	288 (0.48%)	—N/a
1910	74,003	7,593 (10.26%)	28,645 (38.71%)	32,963 (44.54%)	—N/a	—N/a	4 (0.01%)	3,490 (4.72%)	149 (0.20%)	—N/a	341 (0.46%)	—N/a
1920	86,850	16,047 (18.48%)	27,189 (31.31%)	32,097 (36.96%)	8,307 (9.56%)	—N/a	—N/a	—N/a	—N/a	—N/a	—N/a	—N/a
1930	102,390	25,207 (24.62%)	31,773 (31.03%)	33,162 (32.39%)	7,264 (7.09%)	379 (0.37%)	56 (0.05%)	2,237 (2.18%)	—N/a	—N/a	652 (0.64%)	279 (0.27%)
1941	125,052	46,466 (37.16%)	24,891 (19.9%)	37,611 (30.08%)	—N/a	—N/a	—N/a	—N/a	—N/a	—N/a	—N/a	—N/a
1956	142,257	75,855 (53.32%)	29,968 (21.07%)	24,326 (17.1%)	6,700 (4.71%)	122 (0.09%)	56 (0.04%)	3,065 (2.15%)	—N/a	649 (0.46%)	575 (0.4%)	280 (0.2%)
1966	174,243	109,100 (62.61%)	31,016 (17.8%)	25,058 (14.38%)	2,590 (1.49%)	120 (0.07%)	71 (0.04%)	4,188 (2.4%)	—N/a	516 (0.3%)	490 (0.28%)	475 (0.27%)
1977	269,353	191,742 (71.19%)	36,724 (13.63%)	28,429 (10.55%)	1,629 (0.6%)	1,109 (0.41%)	299 (0.09%)	6,776 (2.52%)	124 (0.05%)	481 (0.18%)	404 (0.15%)	942 (0.35%)
1992	334,115	274,511 (82.16%)	31,785 (9.51%)	13,206 (3.95%)	549 (0.16%)	2,668 (0.8%)	756 (0.23%)	7,748 (2.32%)	93 (0.03%)	227 (0.07%)	675 (0.20%)	1,314 (0.39%)
2002	317,660	271,677 (85.52%)	24,287 (7.65%)	7,157 (2.25%)	367 (0.12%)	3,062 (0.96%)	762 (0.24%)	6,311 (1.99%)	142 (0.04%)	171 (0.05%)	570 (0.18%)	1,218 (0.38%)
2011	319,279	259,754 (81.36%)	15,564 (4.87%)	4,193 (1.31%)	176 (0.06%)	2,145 (0.67%)	556 (0.17%)	4,843 (1.52%)	101 (0.03%)	124 (0.04%)	385 (0.12%)	859 (0.27%)
2021	250,849	176,615 (70.41%)	8,313 (3.31%)	2,189 (0.87%)	111 (0.04%)	745 (0.3%)	400 (0.16%)	2,776 (1.11%)	77 (0.03%)	90 (0.04%)	275 (0.11%)	643 (0.26%)
Note: censuses in italics are based on mother tongue rather than ethnicity.

=== Languages ===
Timișoara's linguistic landscape is shaped by its complex historical, cultural, and demographic evolution. Romanian is the official and predominant language, spoken by the vast majority of the population. Reflecting the city's ethnic diversity, several minority languages continue to be present, including Hungarian, German, and Serbian, particularly within older generations and specific ethnic communities. Beyond these, languages such as Slovak, Bulgarian, and Romani have also been part of the city's linguistic fabric for centuries. While Yiddish, once widely spoken among the Jewish population, has nearly vanished, German dialects – especially those of the Swabian (Schwäbisch) variety – remain in use in some communities. In recent decades, the city has experienced increased linguistic diversity due to new waves of migration. Additionally, foreign languages play a significant role in education and daily life: English is widely spoken by younger generations and in professional settings, while French, German, Italian, and Spanish are commonly taught in schools.

=== Religion ===
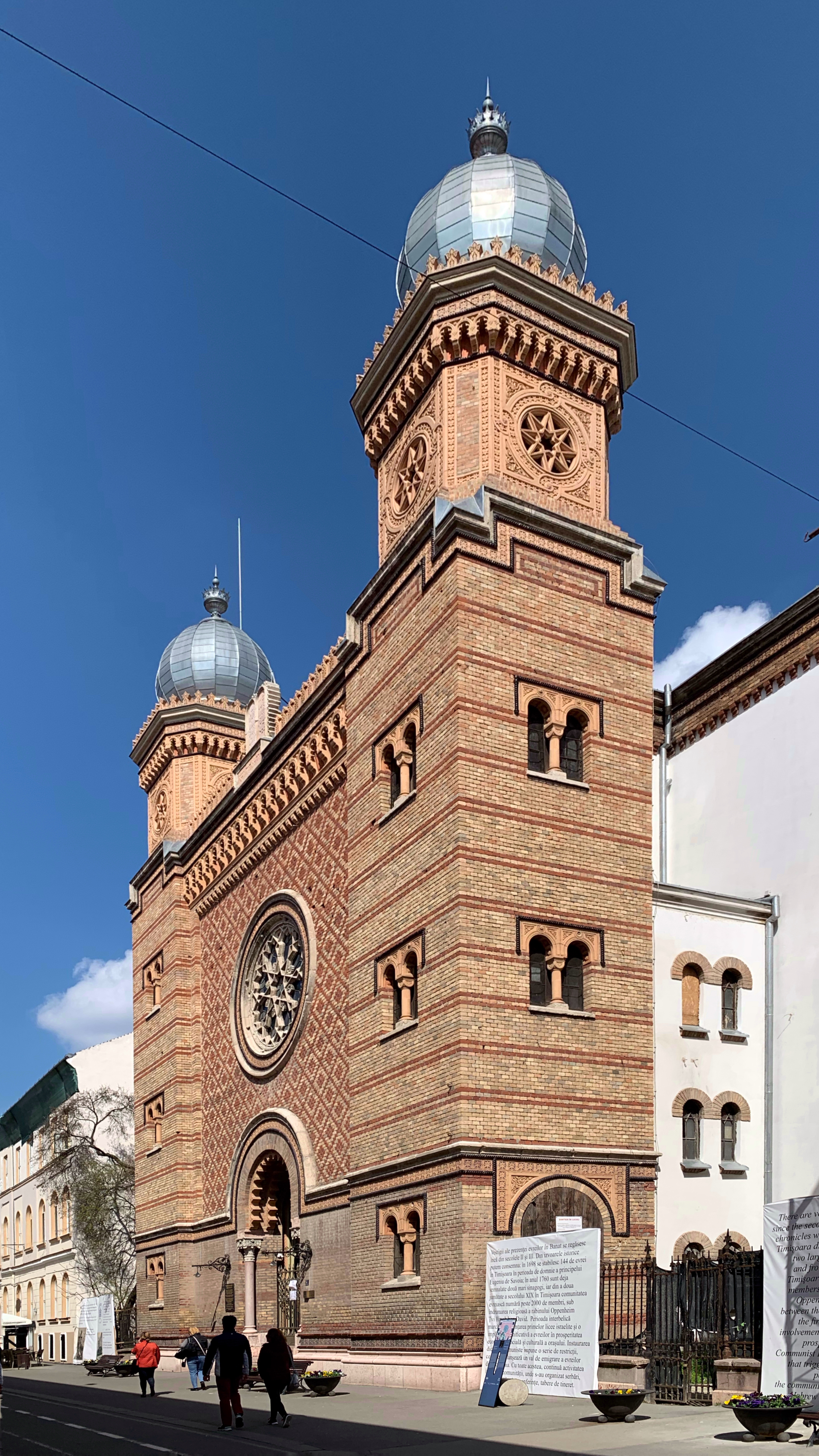
Cetate Synagogue, the largest synagogue in Timișoara

Although much changed throughout its history, the religious composition of Timișoara is diverse. If in 1910 most of the inhabitants were Roman Catholics, in 2011 75% declared themselves Romanian Orthodox.

In Timișoara there are 80 churches, 12 of which were built after 1989; 41 belong to the Orthodox Church, eight to the Roman Catholic Church and three to the Greek Catholic Church. In addition, there are three synagogues in Cetate, Fabric and Iosefin neighborhoods, all three built before World War I, when Jews accounted for 10% of the city's population; the Orthodox synagogue in Iosefin and the central Neolog synagogue still hold regular religious services. Timișoara is the seat of the Archiepiscopate of Timișoara, the see of the Metropolis of Banat, as well as the seat of the Diocese of Timișoara, one of the six Roman Catholic dioceses in Romania.

== Law and government ==
=== Administration ===
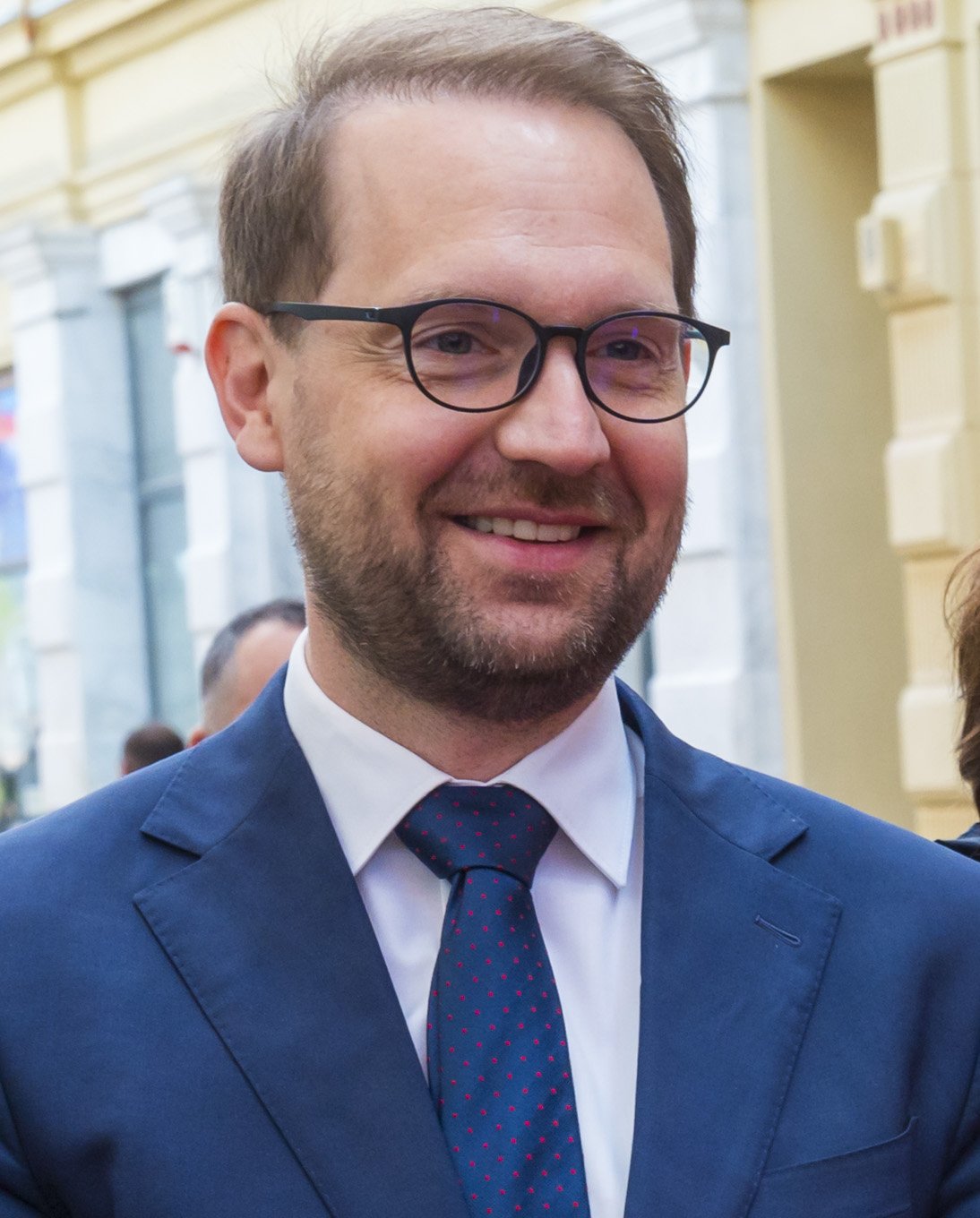
Dominic Fritz, mayor since 2020

The first free local elections in post-communist Timișoara took place in 1992. The winner was Viorel Oancea, of the Civic Alliance Party (PAC), which later merged with the National Liberal Party (PNL). He was the first officer who spoke to the crowd of revolutionaries gathered in Opera Square. The 1996 elections were won by Gheorghe Ciuhandu, of the Christian Democrats (PNȚ-CD). He had four terms, also winning elections in 2000, 2004 and 2008. Meanwhile, Ciuhandu took over the Christian Democratic Party and ran for president of Romania in 2004. Nicolae Robu (PNL) was elected mayor in 2012 and again in 2016. In 2020, Dominic Fritz, a native of Germany, was elected mayor on behalf of the USR with support from the FDGR. He won a new mandate in 2024 on behalf of the United Timișoara Alliance (USR–PMP–FD–UDMR).

The Local council and the city's mayor are elected every four years by the population. Decisions are discussed and approved by the Local Council (Romanian: Consiliu Local) made up of 27 elected councilors. After the 2024 local elections, the Local Council has the following composition by political parties:

Party	Seats	Composition
USR–PMP–FD–UDMR	13	
PSD–PNL	11	
AUR	3	

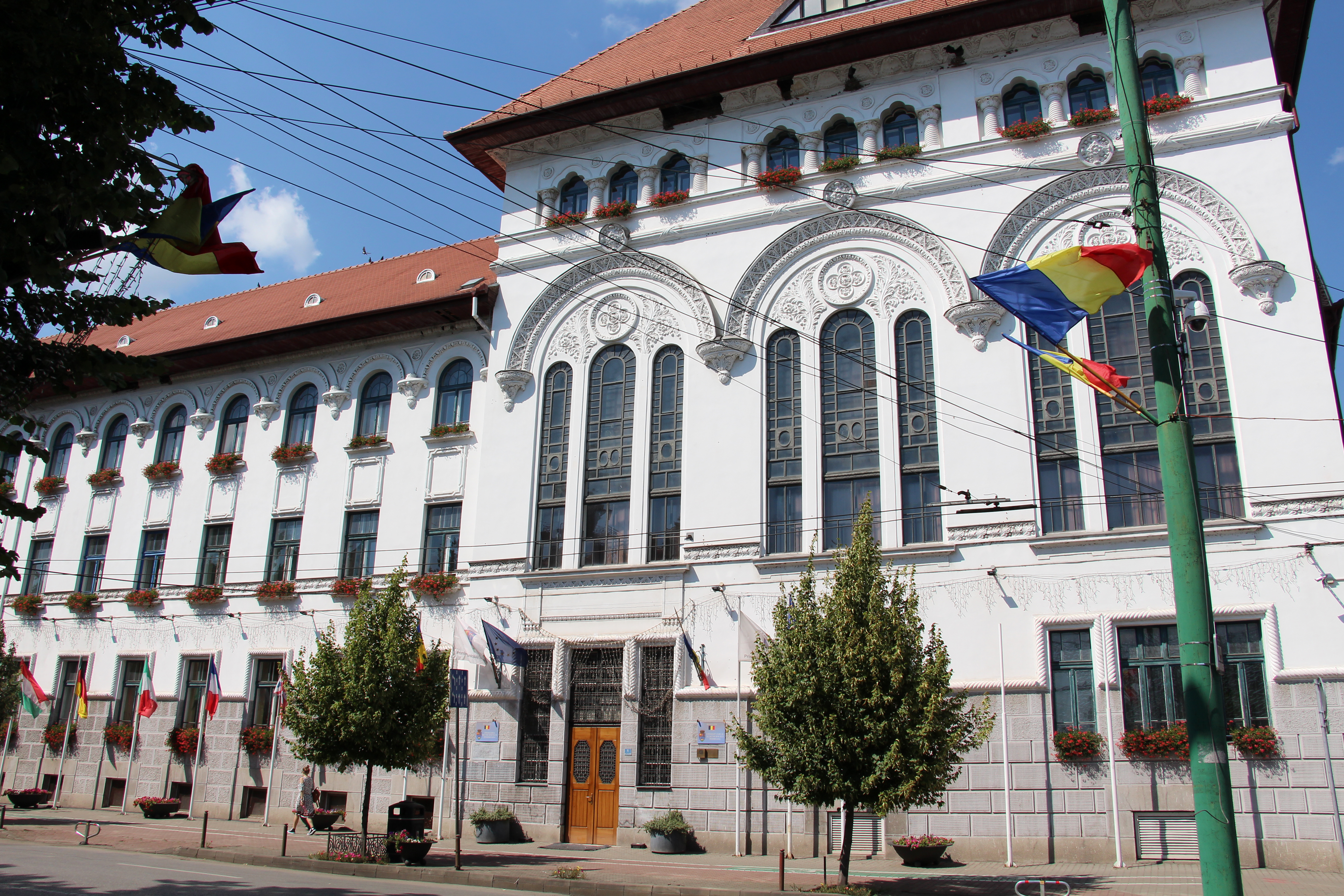
Timișoara City Hall

Additionally, as Timișoara is the capital of Timiș County, the city hosts the Administrative Palace, the headquarters of the County Council (Romanian: Consiliu Județean) and the prefect, who is appointed by Romania's central government. The prefect is not allowed to be a member of a political party, and his role is to represent the national government at the local level, acting as a liaison and facilitating the implementation of national development plans and governing programs at the local level.

In 2003, neighborhood advisory councils were set up as a measure to improve local government consultation with citizens on local public policies. As of 2013, Timișoara had 20 neighborhood advisory councils.

Timișoara is the informal capital of the West development region, which is equivalent to NUTS-II regions in the European Union and is used by the European Union and the Romanian Government for statistical analysis and coordination of regional development projects. The West development region is not an administrative entity. Timișoara is also the largest economic, social and commercial center of the DKMT Euroregion.

==== Districts ====
Traditionally, Timișoara was divided into ten constituencies (Romanian: circumscripții) that today have no administrative function:

Constituency	Area (ha)	Romanian name	German name	Hungarian name	Established
I	480	Cetate	Innerstadt	Belváros	1717
II	1,017	Fabric (Note: Including Viile Fabric (German: Rudolfsheim; Hungarian: Rezsőföld))	Fabrikstadt	Gyárváros	1744
III	668	Elisabetin	Elisabethstadt	Erzsébetváros	1896
IV	442	Iosefin	Josephstadt	Józsefváros	1744
V	493	Mehala	Franzstadt	Ferencváros	1910
VI	231	Fratelia (Note: Including Beșenic (German: Beschenau; Hungarian: Besenyőtelep))	Neutischold	Újtesöld	1919
VII	156	Freidorf	Freidorf	Szabadfalu	1950
VIII	67	Plopi	Kardosch Kolonie	Kardostelep	1951
IX	72	Ghiroda Nouă	Neugiroda	Újgiroda	1951
X	102	Ciarda Roșie	Rotterhof	Vöröscsárda	1953

In addition to the above, a number of new neighborhoods have emerged in the 20th and 21st centuries:

Listed alphabetically

- Aeroport
- Antene
- Aradului
- Baba Dochia
- Badea Cârțan
- Blașcovici
- Braytim–Timișoara Sud
- Bucovina
- Buziașului
- Câmpului
- Circumvalațiunii
- Complexul Studențesc
- Crișan
- Dacia
- Dâmbovița
- Dorobanților
- Gara de Nord
- Girocului (Martirilor)
- I.I. de la Brad
- Kogălniceanu
- Kuncz
- Lipovei
- Mircea cel Bătrân
- Modern
- Odobescu
- Olimpia–Stadion
- Pădurea Verde
- Prințul Turcesc–Lunei
- Ronaț
- Șagului
- Soarelui
- Steaua
- Telegrafului
- Tipografilor
- Torontalului
- UMT

==== Metropolitan area ====
The Timișoara metropolitan area was outlined in 2008 following the collaboration of the local authorities from Timișoara and 14 neighboring communes (Becicherecu Mic, Bucovăț, Dudeștii Noi, Dumbrăvița, Ghiroda, Giarmata, Giroc, Moșnița Nouă, Orțișoara, Pișchia, Remetea Mare, Săcălaz, Sânmihaiu Român and Șag). The Timișoara metropolitan area is part of the Federation of Metropolitan Areas and Urban Agglomerations in Romania (FZMAUR). As of 2016, the metropolitan area groups over 410,000 inhabitants on an area eight times larger than the city proper.

Several localities neighboring Timișoara have experienced a significant development in recent years. Ghiroda, Giroc, Dumbrăvița, Chișoda, Moșnița Nouă and Utvin became suburbs of Timișoara due to the development of facilities, utilities and infrastructure, territorially joining the city. In the last 20 years, Timișoara has expanded its borders by about 8%, which means about 1,000 hectares, due to the construction of new neighborhoods or residential complexes. The city limits were moved outwards in 2006 by almost 5 km (3.1 mi). The largest expansion took place towards Șag.

==== Timișoara–Arad metropolis ====
In August 2016, mayors Nicolae Robu and Gheorghe Falcă signed the deed of establishment of the Timișoara–Arad metropolis, the first of its kind in Romania, part of the integrated development strategy Timișoara Vision 2030, carried out with the support of the World Bank, ADR Vest and FZMAUR. The project has been under discussion since 2006 and involved the unification of the metropolitan areas of Timișoara and Arad. In 2018, the population of the metropolis was 805,000 and is expected to exceed one million by 2030.

=== Justice system ===
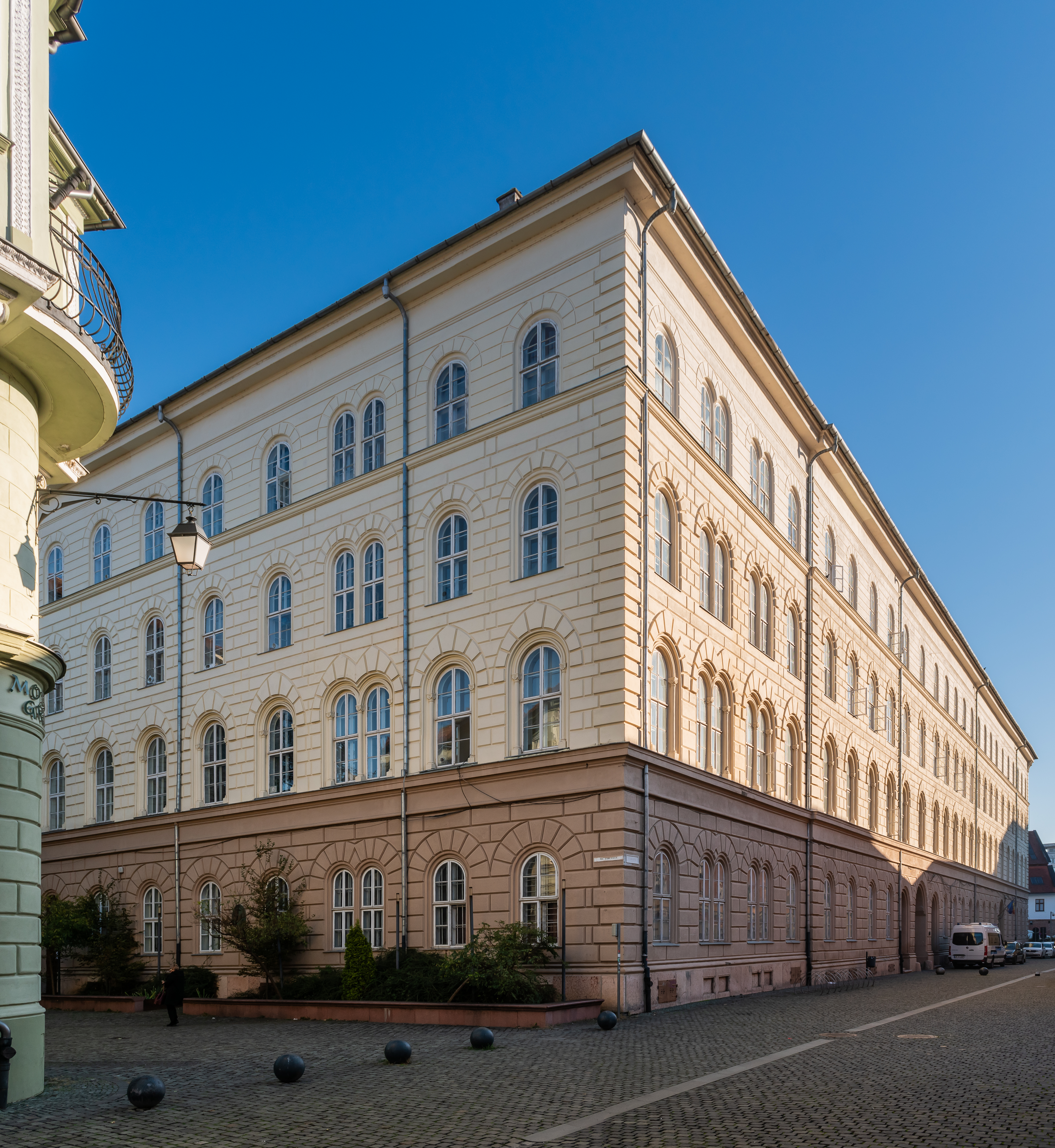
The Dicasterial Palace houses the local court, tribunal and court of appeal.

Timișoara has a complex judicial structure due to its role as the capital of Timiș County. The local judicial body is the Timișoara Court of Justice, which operates under the authority of the Timiș County Tribunal. This tribunal also oversees the courts in Lugoj, Deta, Sânnicolau Mare, and Făget. Appeals and more serious cases from these courts are handled by the Timișoara Court of Appeals. Additionally, the city is home to the county's commercial and military tribunals.

Timișoara maintains its own municipal police force, Poliția Municipiului Timișoara, which is responsible for law enforcement throughout the city and operates several specialized divisions. The headquarters is located on Andrei Mocioni Street near the city center, with five precincts distributed across the city. The municipal police operate under the authority of the County Police Inspectorate, based on Take Ionescu Boulevard. Additionally, the City Hall runs its own community police force, Poliția Primăriei, which focuses on local community matters. Timișoara is also home to the County Gendarmerie Inspectorate.

Although the Romanian Police reported a relatively high local crime rate of 799 incidents in 2024, Timișoara nevertheless continues to rank among the safest urban areas in Romania.

== Economy ==
Timișoara is one of the most dynamic economic centers in Romania. Based on its proximity to the western border, Timișoara has managed to attract many foreign investments in recent years, forming, together with Arad, the second largest area in Romania in terms of economic mass. By the mid-2000s, the foreign investments in Timișoara amounted to €753 per capita, compared to €450 per capita at county level. Most of these investments come from the EU countries, especially from Italy, Germany and France. Similar to other growth poles in Romania, the services sector has developed significantly in recent years, accounting for half of the revenues.

After the fall of communism and the transition to a market economy, the private sector grew steadily. In the first decade of the 21st century, Timișoara has experienced an economic boom as the amount of foreign investment, especially in high-tech sectors, has risen. In an article in late 2005, French magazine L'Expansion called Timișoara Romania's economic showcase, and referred to the increased number of foreign investments as a "second revolution". In 2016, Timișoara was awarded by Forbes as the most dynamic city and the best city for business in Romania. Between 2000 and 2013, Timișoara had the highest growth rate of GDP per capita, surpassing even Bucharest. The local economic development has been reflected accordingly in the unemployment figures. For instance, in December 2019, the unemployment rate in Timișoara was among the lowest in the country, with only 0.8%.

=== Industrial sector ===
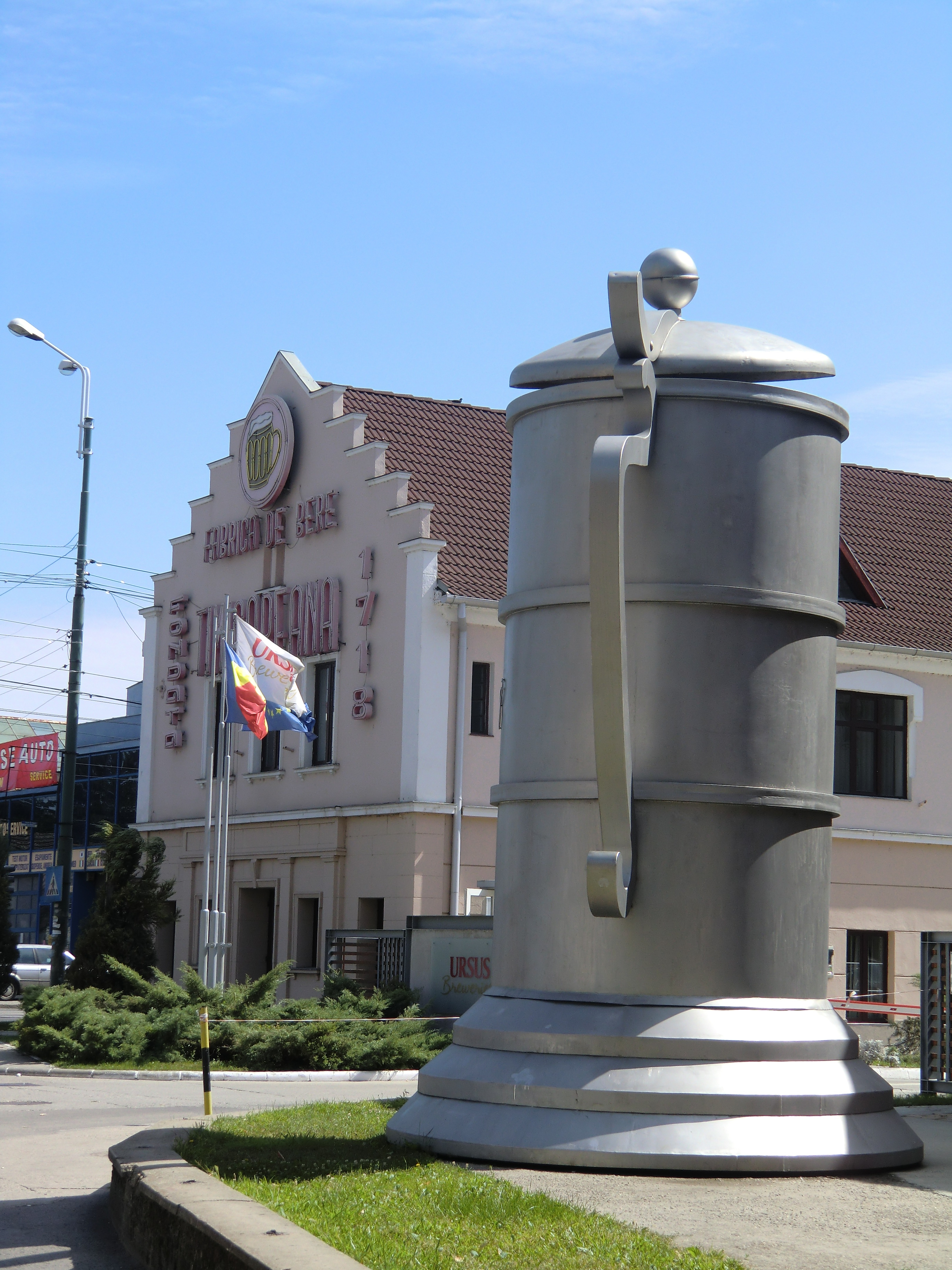
Timișoreana Brewery, the first brewery established on the current territory of Romania.

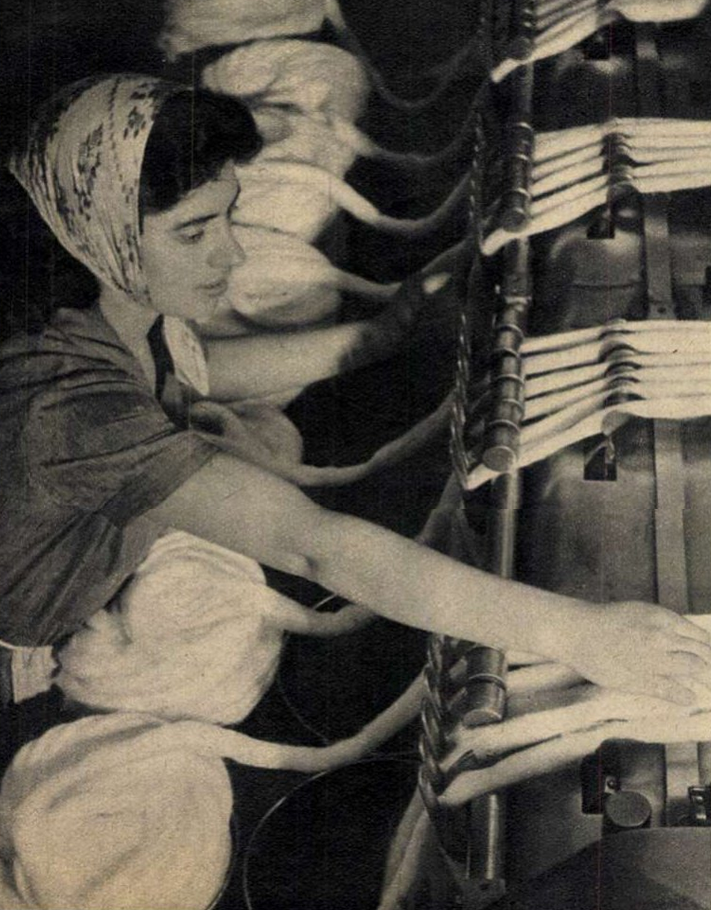
Woman operating a cotton roll machine at Uzinele Textile Timișoara, 1961. During Ceaușescu's time, labor force came to Timișoara from all over Romania

After 1989, major changes took place in the structure of industrial activities in Timișoara due to the restructuring and retrofitting processes, industrial production currently including both traditional sub-branches and new, modern and dynamic ones. Unlike cities such as Cluj-Napoca, Iași or Bucharest, the localization of industry within the city is specific to Timișoara. The main industrial groups in the city can be structured in three types: urban industrial areas, with large area and complex profile (Calea Buziașului, Freidorf, pericentral area along the railway, Calea Șagului, etc.), industrial platforms with unitary profile (UMT and Solventul) and dispersed industrial units, respectively. In recent decades, industrial areas have developed along major road or rail arteries, with a tendency to group units by industrial profiles.

There are eight industrial zones in Timișoara where factories and plants cover several sectors from electronics, chemical and automotive to food processing and textile industries.

Buziașului industrial area concentrates units for chemical industry and production of automotive and electronic components. The area has seen an important development in recent years, attracting major investments from Procter & Gamble, Continental, Dräxlmaier, Elbromplast, AEM, Saguaro, etc. In 2013 Optica Business Park was inaugurated here. Developed on the old buildings of the former lens factory, Optica Business Park offices have attracted tenants such as Microsoft, Linde or ZTE. Șagului industrial area includes warehouses of construction materials (Arabesque, Arthema, Lipoplast, Mobexpert, etc.), as well as a significant number of showrooms and car dealers (Mercedes-Benz, Ford, Mitsubishi, Hyundai, Citroën, Opel, etc.). An important role in the development and diversification of the profile of the area is played by the Incontro Industrial Park, where construction companies are mainly located. Calea Șagului has also become an important commercial area, with hypermarkets such as Brico Dépôt, Auchan, Jysk, Metro or Leroy Merlin. Stretched on a usable area of 63 ha, Freidorf Industrial Park is an important area for attracting foreign investment, encouraging business development and creating new jobs. The automotive components industry predominates in the area (Kromberg & Schubert, ContiTech, ELBA, etc.). In the UMT industrial area are located mainly chemical and automotive industry units (Continental, Linde, Hella, etc.), but also warehouses. Torontalului industrial area includes units for manufacturing industry (Flex, Coca-Cola, SCA, etc.). The Timișoara Technology and Industrial Park was arranged here, with the aim of supporting the development of SMEs in fields such as software, IT and communications or electronics and electrical engineering. Aradului industrial area is the newest industrial area, with various locations for storage and provision of services. Like Calea Șagului, the Aradului area has become an important commercial hub, retailers like Selgros, Hornbach, Altex or Auchan operating here.

The main industrial branches, which have experienced an important growth in Timișoara, are the automotive industry, the chemical and petrochemical industry, as well as the electronics industry. The automotive components industry has registered a strong development in recent years, as a consequence of the need for technological development within existing industrial units, in Timișoara concentrating renowned companies in this field (Dräxlmaier, Kromberg & Schubert, ContiTech, TRW Automotive, Mahle, Hella, Dura, Valeo, Autoliv, Honeywell, etc.). In 2016, a competence center for automotive engineering – CERC – was inaugurated in the Freidorf area. This economic branch has old traditions. Between 1988 and 1991, the Romanian car model Dacia 500 Lăstun was made in the Tehnometal factories.

The electronics and electrical engineering industry is a successful branch of Timișoara's industry, especially due to the investments of large companies with activities in high tech production (Flex, Bosch, ABB, AEM, ELBA, Ericsson, etc.), which determined a development of local companies, suppliers or subcontractors.

The chemical and petrochemical industry, traditional in Timișoara, has developed especially through the investments made by Continental, Procter & Gamble and Azur.

Along with large investors from the top industries mentioned above, in Timișoara are concentrated a large number of companies, especially small and medium enterprises, in traditional fields such as textile and clothing industry, textile manufacturing and leather and footwear industry, foreign investors interested in these sectors mainly due to low production costs.

=== Office sector ===
United Business Center 1, part of Iulius Town urban ensemble

The office sector has boomed in the last decade, the stock of class A offices available for rent reaching 290,000 m^{2} in 2020, almost 10% of Bucharest's stock. The return on investment in office buildings exceeds the level in Bucharest (7%), standing at around 8.25%. The city has the lowest vacancy rate of class A office spaces, 5% in 2014.

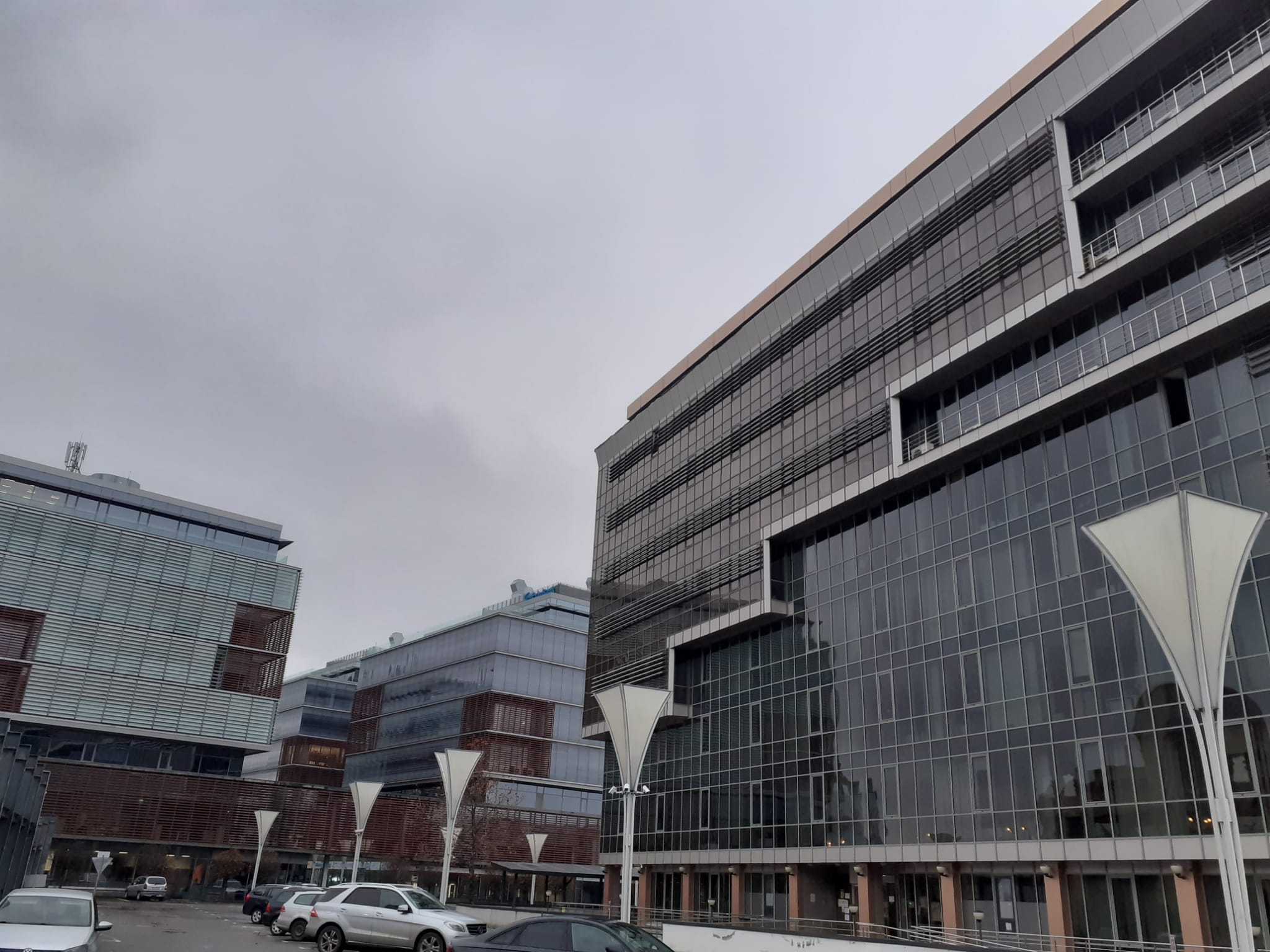
AFI Park and ANAF

AFI Park (formerly City Business Center) is the main office park in Timișoara, located in the city center. Completed in 2015, the complex is fully leased, with tenants including international companies such as Accenture, SAP, Deloitte, Wipro, IBM, Visma, Hella, etc. Named the greenest office project in Romania by BREEAM, Vox Technology Park was completed in early 2018. Bega Business Park is located near the historic center. The first two buildings were completed in 2015 and early 2018, respectively, and are fully occupied by Nokia's campus. Under construction are ISHO Offices, part of a larger project, and United Business Center. The latter will include the tallest office building in Romania (155 m).

=== IT&C sector ===
At national level, Timișoara is one of the poles of the most intense activities in the IT industry. Well-known companies such as Google, Microsoft, IBM, Intel, Nvidia, Siemens, Nokia, Huawei, Atos, Accenture, Endava, Bitdefender or Visteon have offices in the city, supporting – through the hubs and the digital workshops created – start-ups and SMEs in the field. Before the rapid expansion of Cluj-Napoca, Timișoara concentrated the most IT professionals after Bucharest. In 2014, Timișoara had 7,000 employees in the field. In the same year, the Incuboxx cluster was inaugurated. Incuboxx is the largest IT&C business incubator in Romania, which includes 54 office spaces addressed to entrepreneurs and companies with local capital in the field.

Timișoara ranks 394th in the 2019 Innovation Cities Index, an annual list of the world's most innovation-friendly cities. Bucharest and Timișoara are the only Romanian cities on the list published by the World Economic Forum.

=== Real estate sector ===
The real estate market in Timișoara, supported by the upward economic trend, has been booming lately. In 2017, about 4,000 living spaces were delivered to the market, an increase of almost 60% compared to the previous year, most of the projects representing high-rise residential complexes, addressed to the mass and mid-market segments. In the first nine months of 2016, according to the National Agency for Cadastre and Real Estate Advertising, over 32,000 sale/purchase transactions were concluded, making Timiș County the largest real estate market in Romania after Bucharest–Ilfov. 87% of them took place in Timișoara and neighboring communes. Among the largest residential complexes in Timișoara are ISHO, Adora Forest, Vivalia Grand, XCity Towers, Vox Vertical Village, Ateneo and City of Mara.

After 1989 the rural areas within the city became "hot spots" for housing investors, and the emergence of the middle class after 2000 changed both the landscape and the prices of houses and land. In 2020, for example, the price of an apartment reached 1,300 euros/m^{2}, the third-highest among Romanian big cities, after Cluj-Napoca and Bucharest. On the other hand, the phenomenon of gentrification renewed a part of the underused housing stock.

=== Commercial sector ===
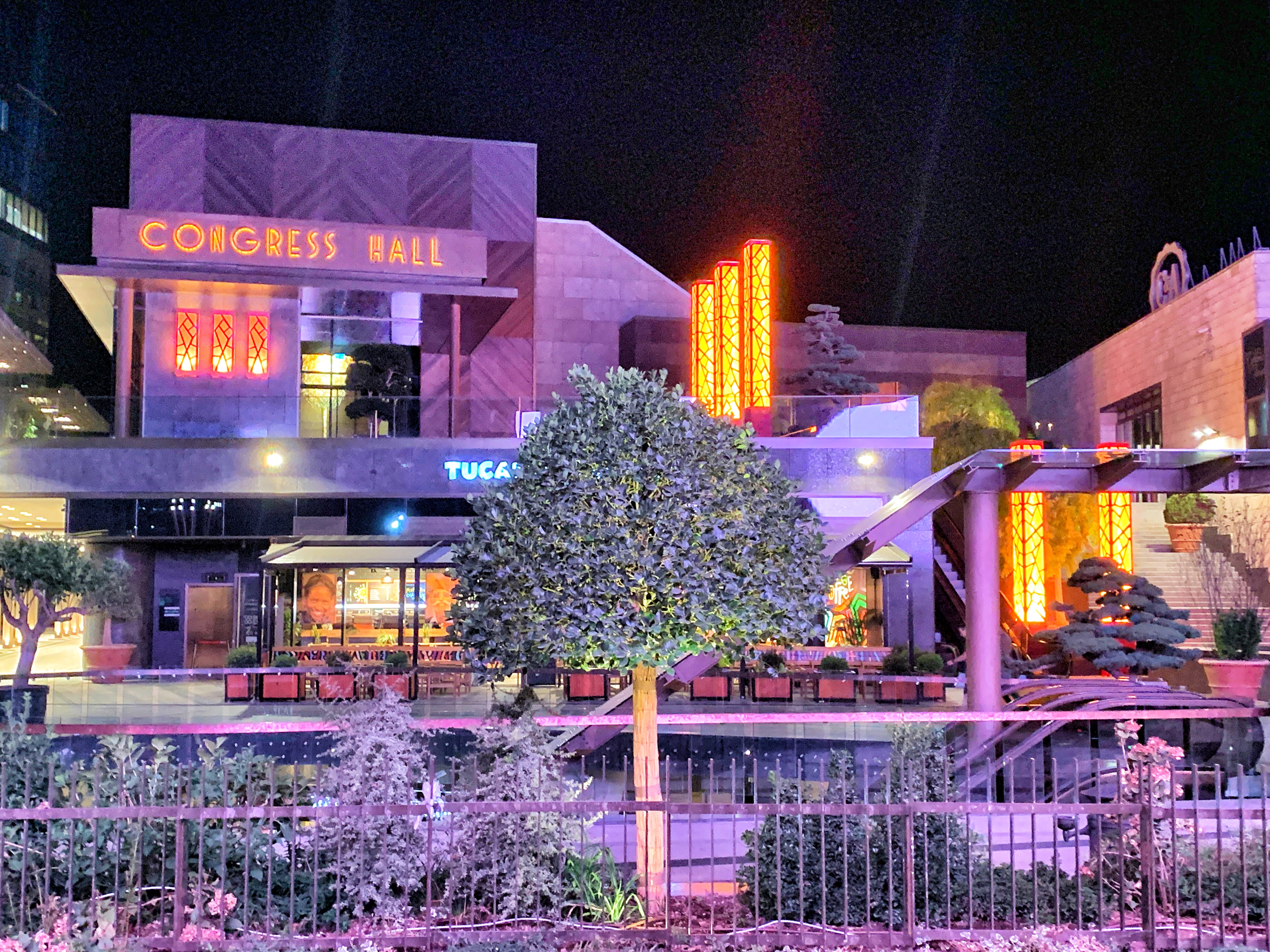
Iulius Town at night

Bega Shopping Center is the only shopping center in the center of Timișoara and the first in the city. Bega Shopping Center is structured on six levels and has a leasable area of 7,500 m^{2}, of which 1,300 are allocated to a Carrefour supermarket. Bega Group, the holding company that owns Bega Shopping Center, has opened three other retail parks in Buziașului, Circumvalațiunii and Lipovei.

Iulius Mall was inaugurated in October 2005. Following an investment by Iulius Group and Atterbury Europe, Iulius Mall has been integrated into a large urban regeneration project – Iulius Town, complementing it with retail, office and entertainment functions. Iulius Town has the largest shopping area in Romania (120,000 m^{2}), a space that brings together over 450 stores. The estimated annual traffic for Iulius Town is over 20 million visitors.

The second mall, Shopping City, opened in March 2016. The shopping center has a leasable area of 70,000 m^{2}, covering almost 20 ha and comprising 110 stores on two levels. Within Shopping City, the largest Cinema City multiplex outside Bucharest was opened in April 2016, with 13 3D rooms, an IMAX room and a 4DX room. In the first year since its opening, Shopping City had a traffic of over nine million visitors.

The first strip mall in the city, Funshop Park, opened in 2022. Built on the former industrial platform of Azur, Funshop Park has a leasable area of 10,800 m^{2} and is provided with an outdoor food court area.

Along with the existing stores in the central area, new supermarkets have been opened by national and international concerns such as Selgros, Metro, Auchan, Kaufland, Carrefour, Lidl, Penny, Mega Image or Profi. On the bricolage and DIY market are present the stores of Dedeman, Hornbach, Brico Dépôt, Arabesque, Leroy Merlin, Mobexpert, Mömax, Jumbo and Decathlon, among others, part of local and international chains.

=== Tourism ===
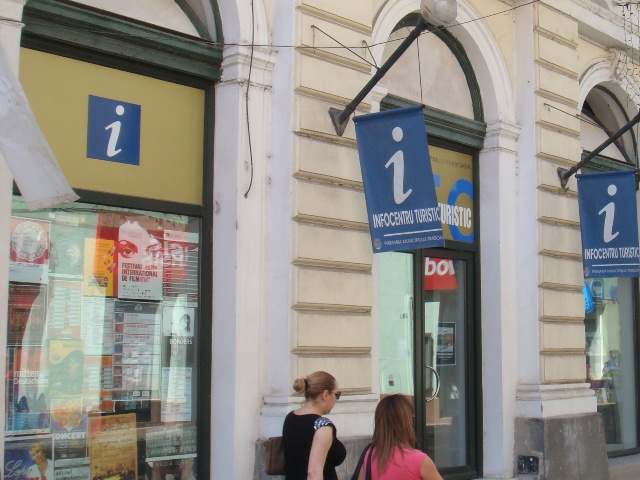
Tourist information center on Alba Iulia Street

Timișoara constitutes the core of regional tourism, receiving 80% of the area's tourists. It draws 250,000–300,000 tourists each year and is distinguished by its safety, quality of hospitality, and gastronomic excellence. Recreational tourism (such as city breaks and visits to friends and relatives) accounts for the largest share, followed by business and study tourism. The majority of tourists are young, well-educated individuals, primarily from Romania and other European countries. The average stay is two nights. Among international visitors, Germany constitutes the city's leading inbound market, generating nearly one-quarter of total foreign tourist arrivals and recording the highest average length of stay.

In 2013, in Timișoara there were 107 accommodation units (comprising 49 hotels, seven hostels, 50 pensions, and an international campsite) totaling 5,547 accommodation places.

Responsible for promoting Timișoara as an urban tourist destination is Visit Timișoara, established in 2022 at the initiative of Timișoara City Hall. In 2026, Timișoara was designated the destination of the year in Romania, a title awarded following a public vote and a decision by a specialized jury.

== Education ==
=== Pre-university education ===
Preschool education takes place in 70 kindergartens; the primary education in 47 schools; the secondary education in 36 high schools; the post-secondary education in 11 post-secondary schools; and the master workman education in six foreman schools. The school network also includes two special high schools for students with disabilities, three schools of inclusive education, five seminaries, a special school for students with amblyopia, two educational assistance centers and a Waldorf high school. The private education system includes an international school and high school with teaching according to the British curriculum, an English-language kindergarten and primary school, as well as a nursery and kindergarten with teaching according to the Finnish curriculum.

The specificity of pre-university education in Timișoara is the diversity of teaching languages. The city's rich multiethnic tradition has been maintained by the schools with teaching in Hungarian (Béla Bartók High School), German (Nikolaus Lenau High School), English (William Shakespeare High School), French (Jean-Louis Calderon High School) and Serbian (Dositej Obradović High School).

According to a ranking made by the AdmitereLiceu.ro portal in 2020, five high schools in Timișoara are among the top 100 high schools in Romania: Grigore Moisil High School, Constantin Diaconovici Loga National College, National College of Banat, Carmen Sylva National Pedagogical College and Nikolaus Lenau High School.

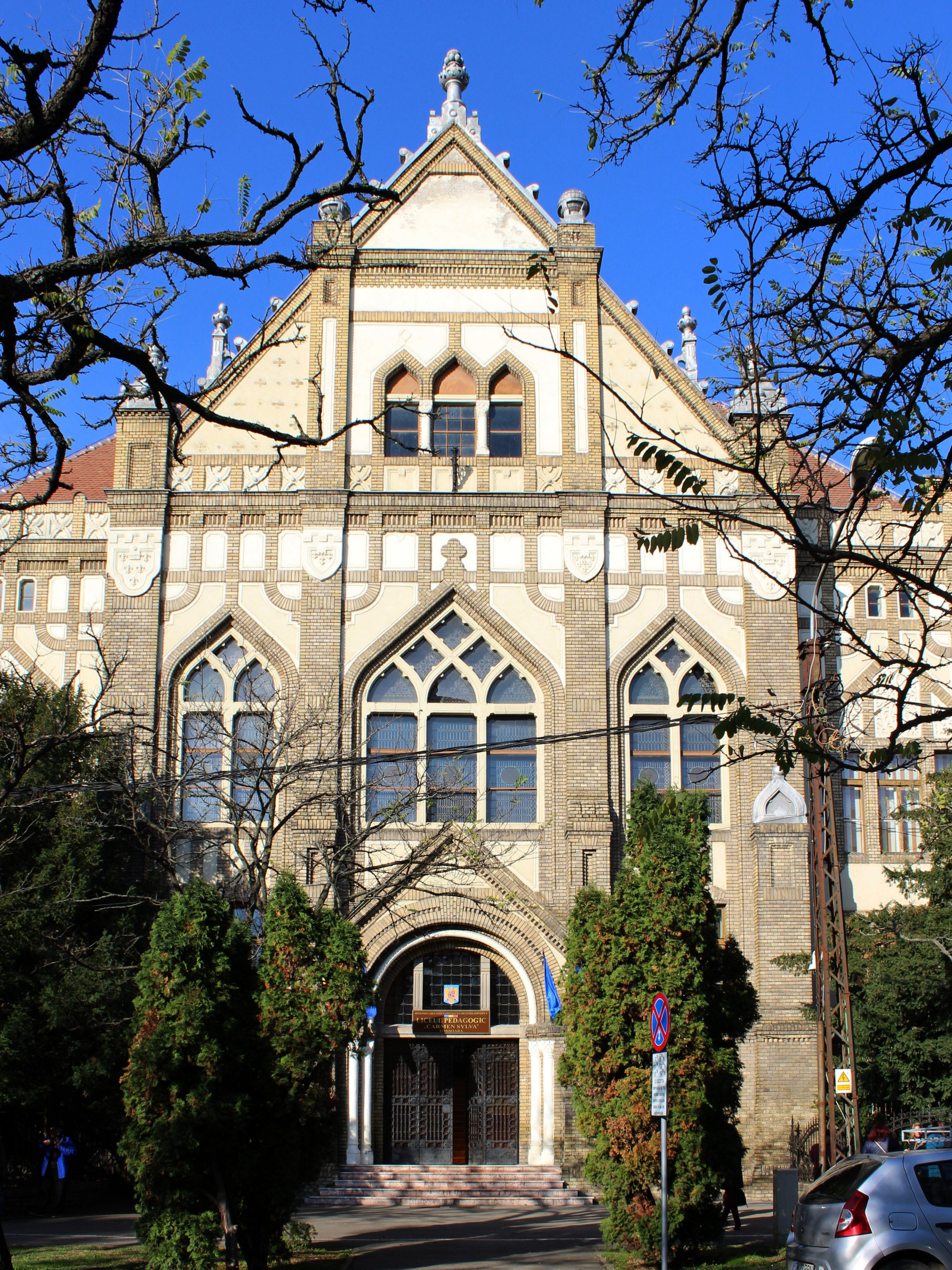
Carmen Sylva National Pedagogical College

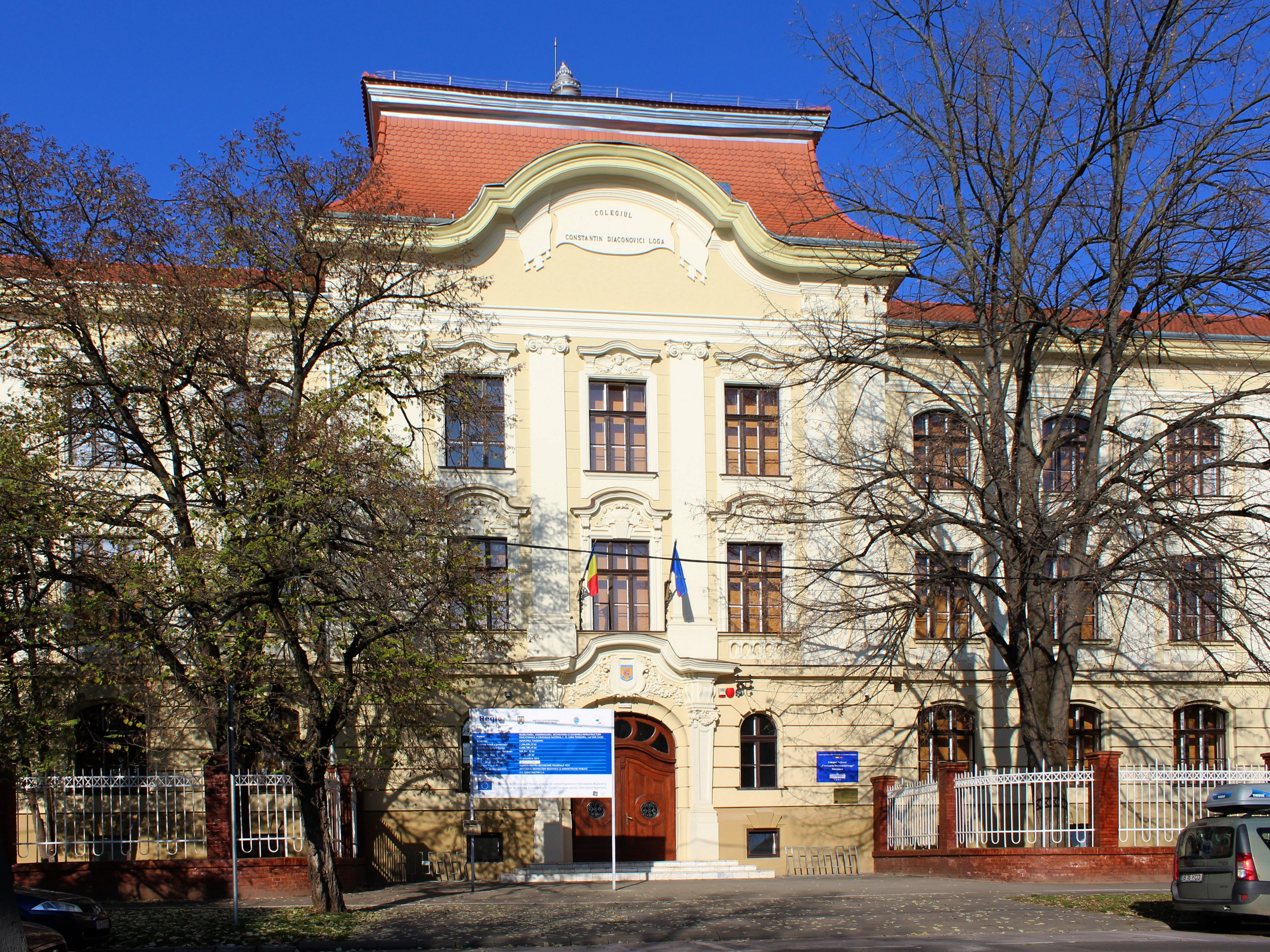
Constantin Diaconovici Loga National College

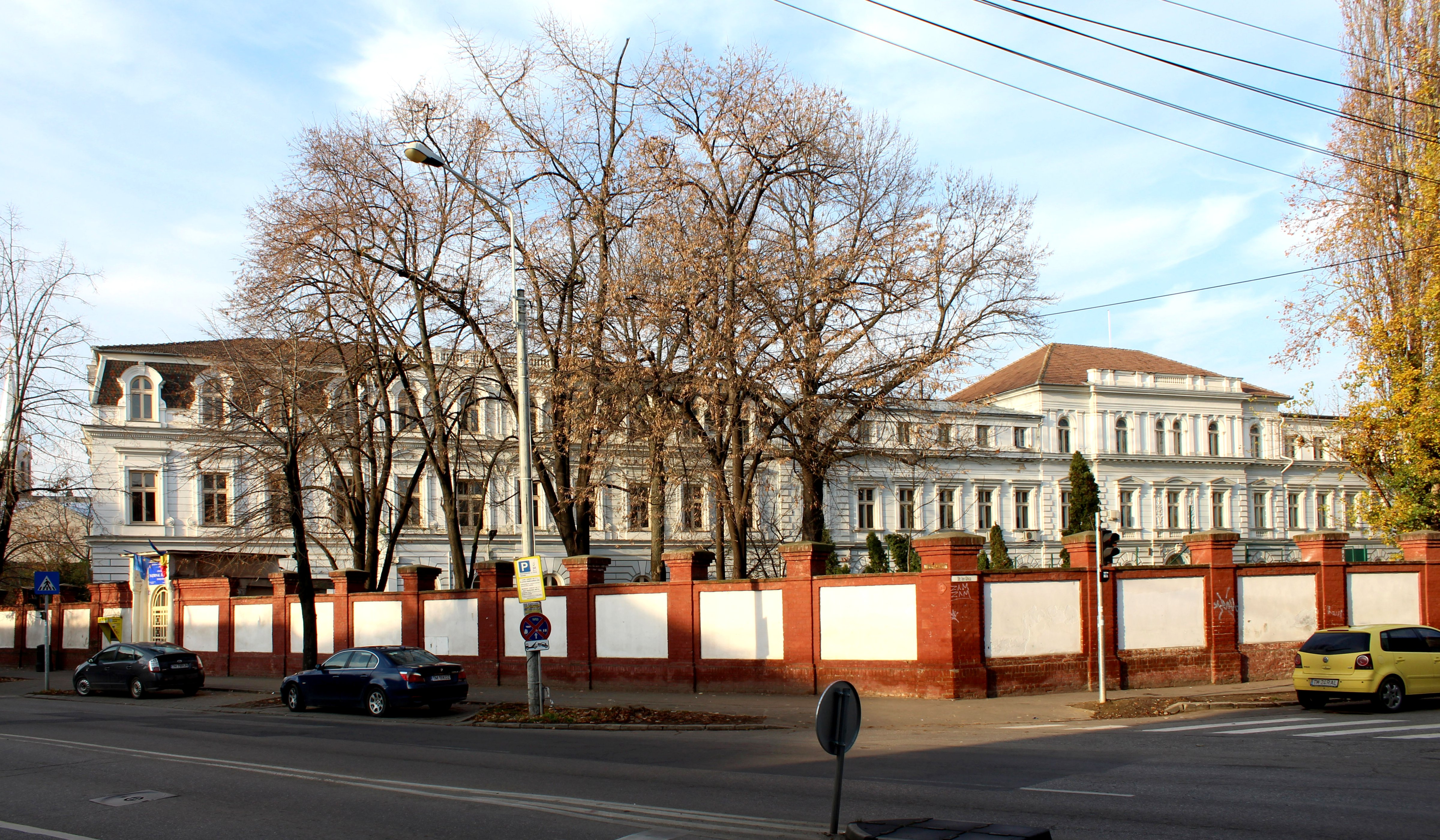
National College of Banat

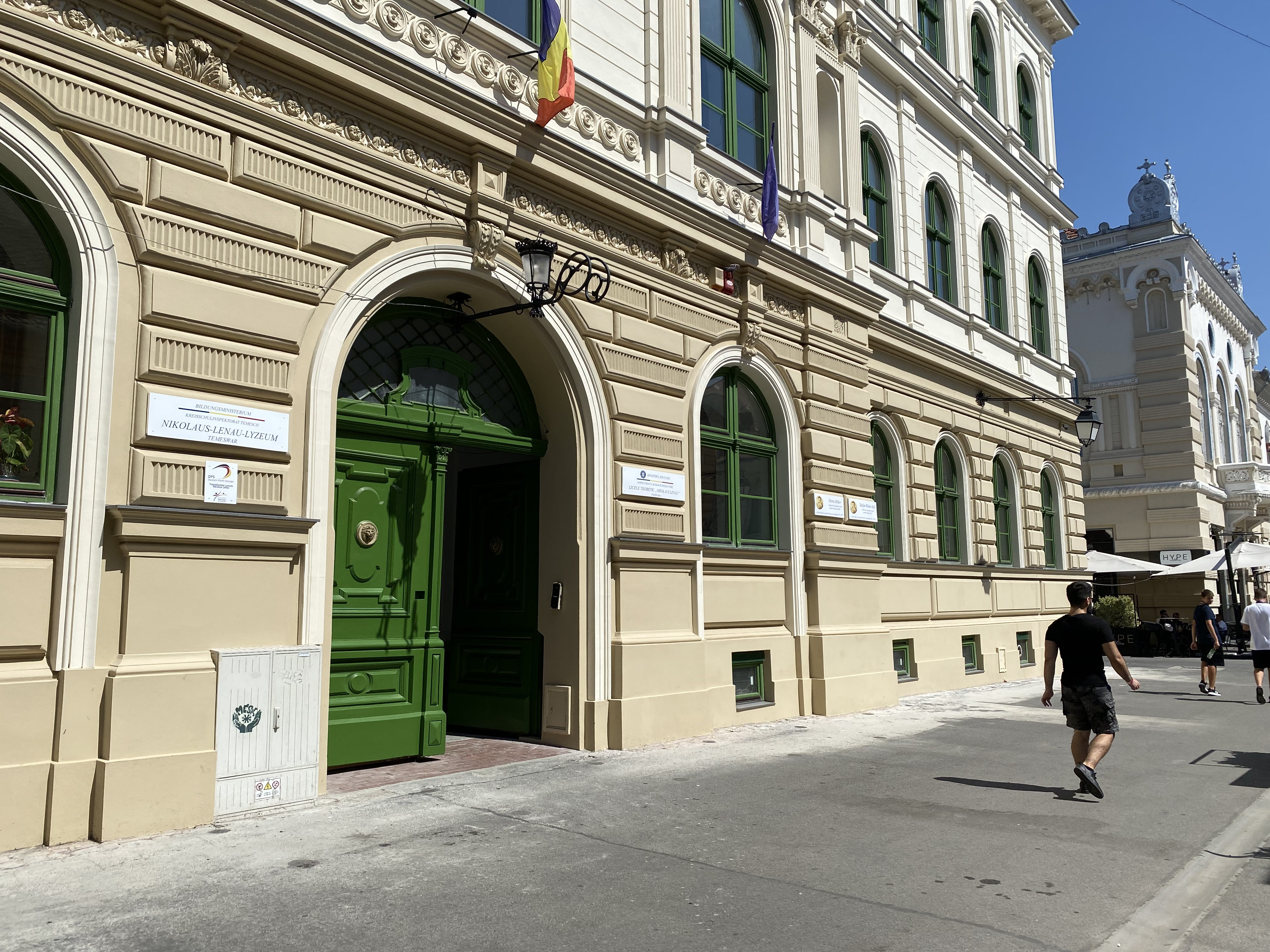
Nikolaus Lenau High School

=== Higher education ===
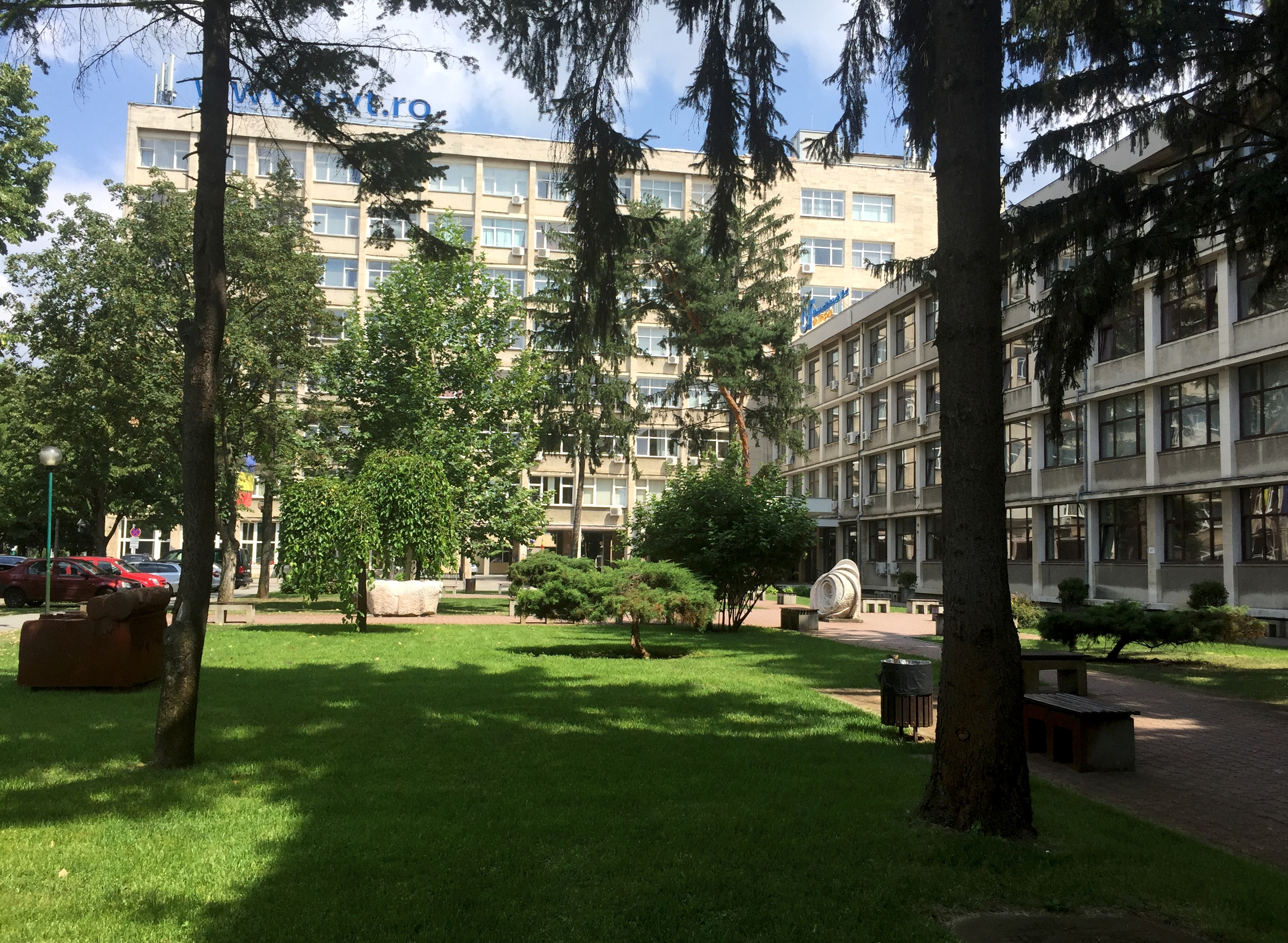
West University

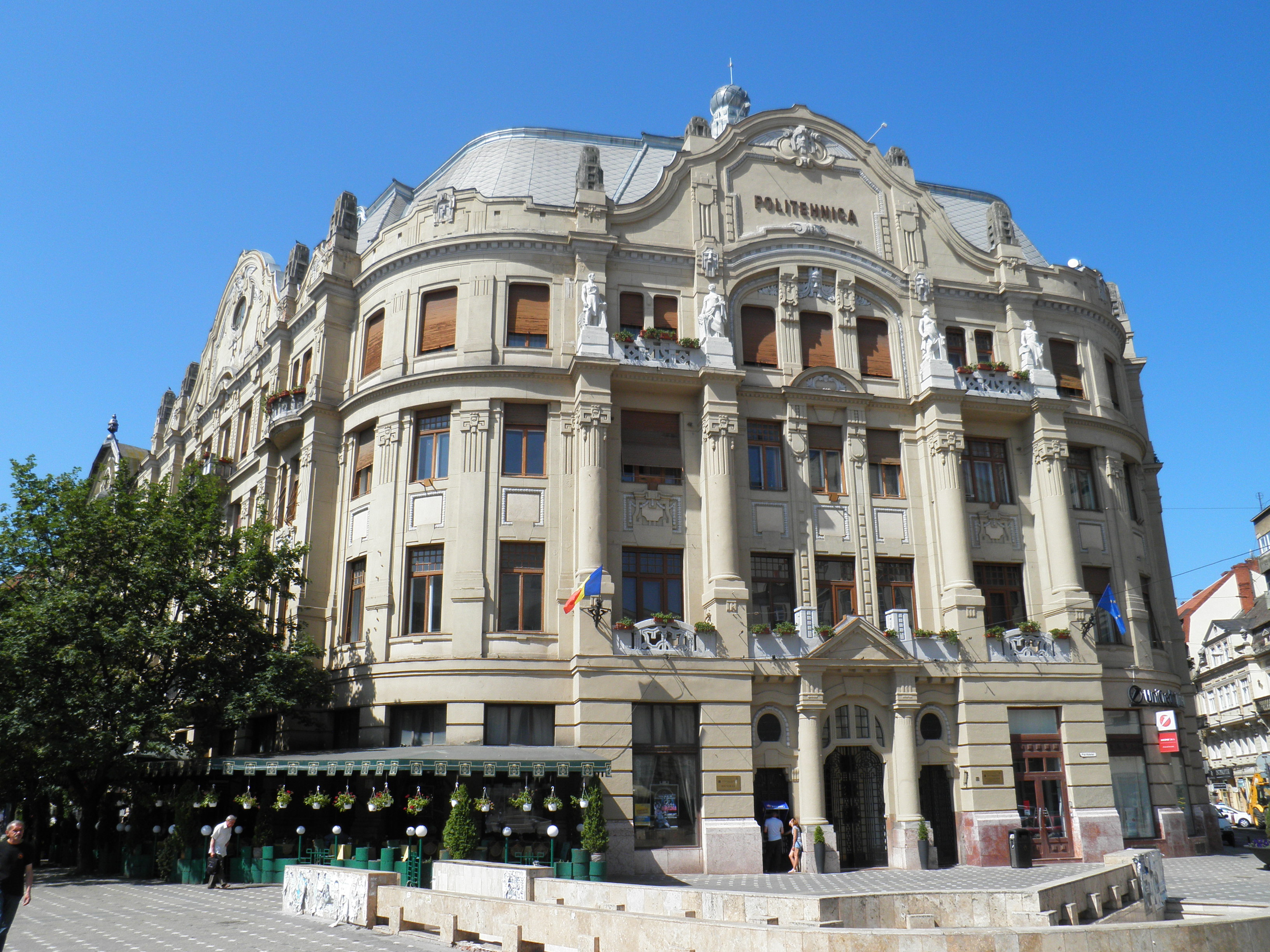
Lloyd Palace, the rectorate of the Polytechnic University

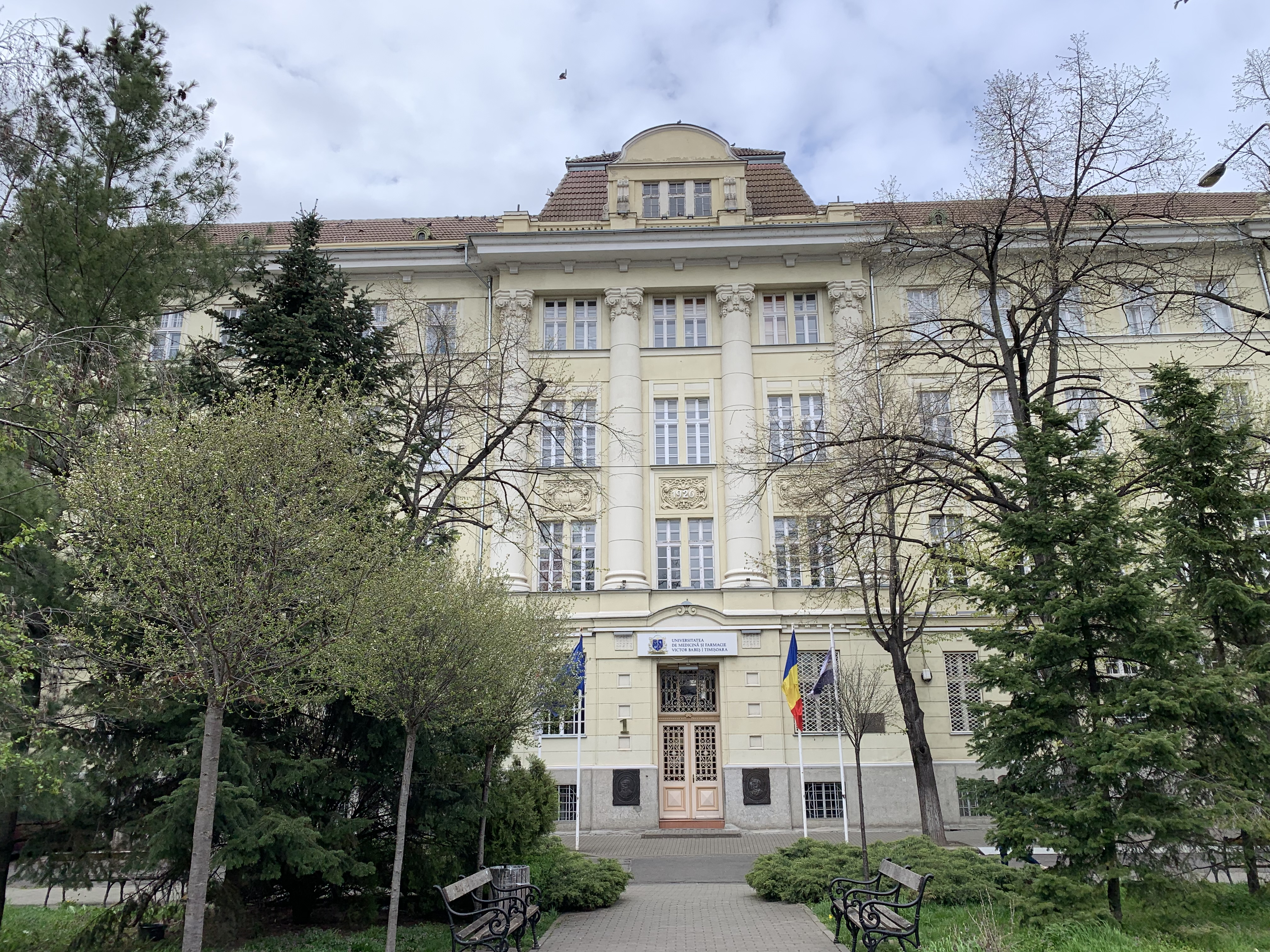
Victor Babeș University of Medicine and Pharmacy

Higher education has a tradition of over 100 years, with the establishment of the Polytechnic University in 1920. From then until today, Timișoara has become the most important university and academic center in western Romania, with about 40,000 students enrolled in undergraduate and postgraduate study programs in four public and two private universities. There are branches of the National Alliance of Student Organizations in Romania and AIESEC. Student organizations are very active, known for events such as StudentFest, the largest international student art and culture festival in Southeast Europe or the ten-day International Student Week.

The Polytechnic University is one of the largest and most famous technical universities in Central and Eastern Europe. In 2011 it was classified by the Ministry of Education in the category of universities of advanced research and education, the highest position that a university in Romania can reach. In the 2018 SCImago Institutions Rankings, the Polytechnic University is on the third place among the Romanian universities with research activity. Established by royal decree in 1944, the West University is the largest university in the city in terms of student numbers. The West University is one of the five members of the Universitaria Consortium, the group of elite Romanian universities. In 2018, the West University was present in 19 international rankings of universities, one of the top-ranked in Romania. One of the six medical universities in Romania is located in Timișoara – the Victor Babeș University of Medicine and Pharmacy. The fourth public university in Timișoara, specialized in life sciences and veterinary medicine, is the King Michael I University of Life Sciences.

The four public universities are grouped under the Timișoara University Alliance, founded in 2020 and the first structure of this kind in Romania.

The student campuses are located in Complexul Studențesc–Medicinei (25 dormitories), Lipovei–Tipografilor (six dormitories) and Blașcovici (two dormitories), offering a total of about 13,000 accommodation places. Complexul Studențesc in particular is known for its nightlife, with several pubs, bistros, nightclubs and themed bars concentrated here.

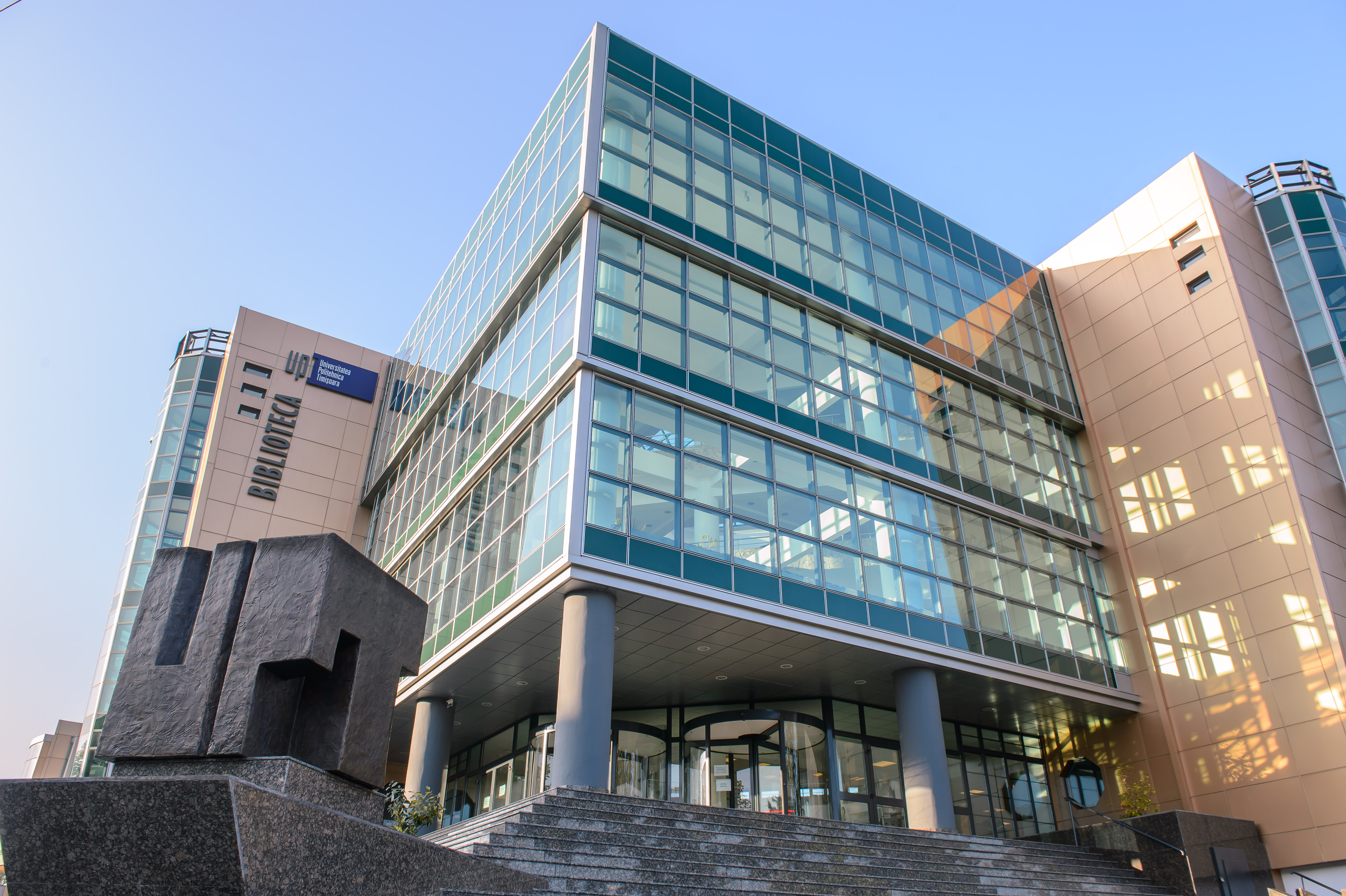
Central Library of the Polytechnic University

There are several public libraries, municipal or university, most importantly:

- Library of the Victor Babeș University of Medicine and Pharmacy, founded in 1946;
- Central Library of the Polytechnic University, hosted between 1947 and 2014 in the ensemble of Piarist Gymnasium;
- Eugen Todoran Central University Library, with a book fund of over one million volumes;
- Sorin Titel County Library, founded in 1904.

=== Scientific research ===
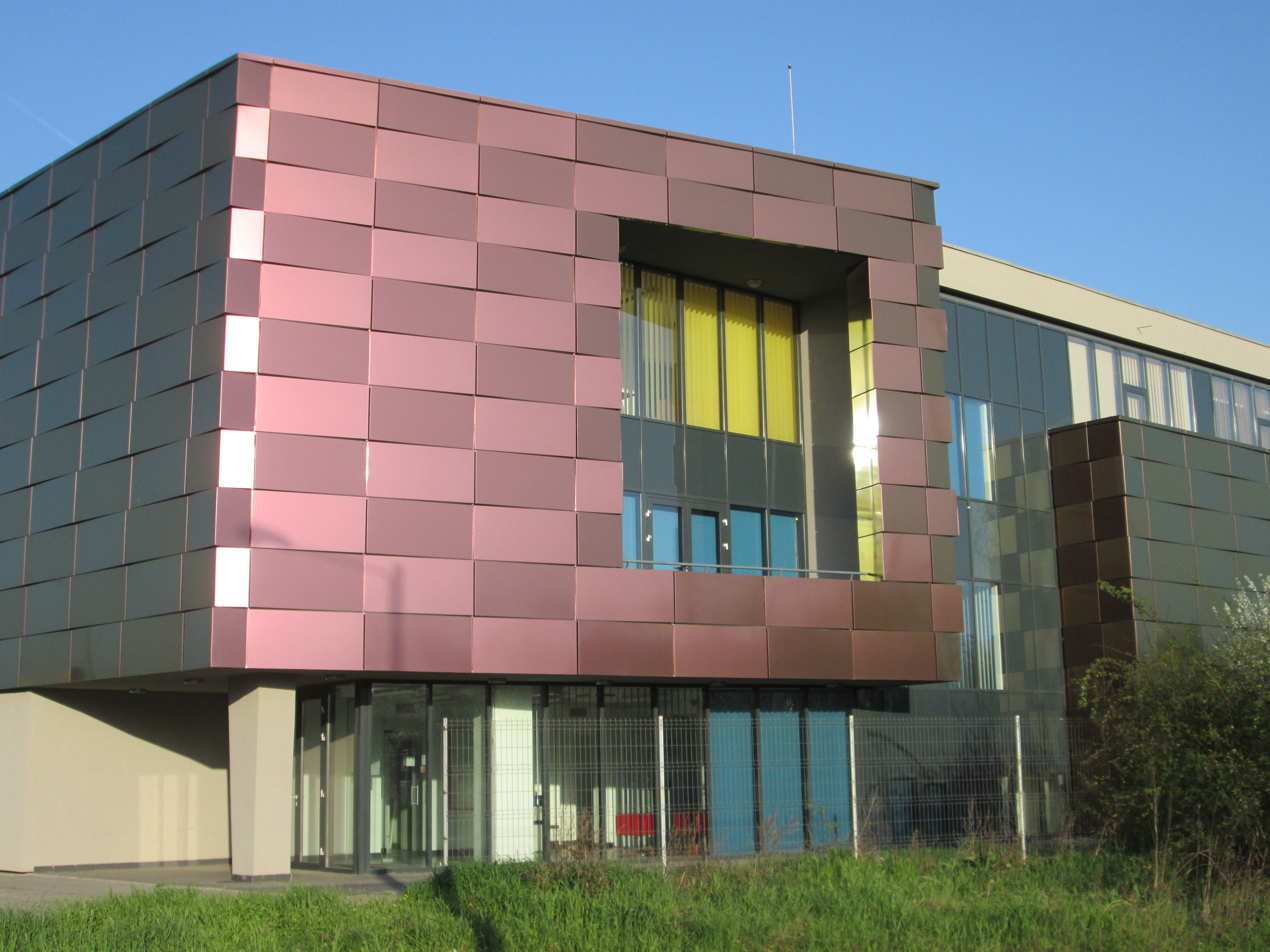
The Renewable Energy–Photovoltaic Laboratory within the INCEMC

Several institutes operate within the Timișoara branch of the Romanian Academy: the National R&D Institute for Electrochemistry and Condensed Matter, the National R&D Institute for Welding and Materials Testing, the Titu Maiorescu Institute of Banat Studies, the Coriolan Drăgulescu Institute of Chemistry and the Astronomical Observatory.

In the patrimony of the West University there are several research centers, such as: the Institute of Advanced Environmental Research, the Nicholas Georgescu-Roegen Interdisciplinary Training and Research Platform, the Creation Center of Contemporary Visual Arts, the Research Laboratory in Structural and Computational Chemistry–Physics for Nanosciences and QSAR, the Research Center in Criminal Sciences, the East European Center for Research in Economics and Business, the Center for Romance Studies, the Research Center in Computer Sciences, the Center for Social Research and Development, the Institute of Socio-Political Research, etc. Also in Timișoara there are branches of the Academy of Medical Sciences and the Academy of Technical Sciences, respectively.

The first computer built in Romania (1961) was put into operation within the Polytechnic Institute of Timișoara, nowadays the Polytechnic University. It was called MECIPT, an acronym for "Electronic Computing Machine of the Polytechnic Institute of Timișoara" (Romanian: Mașina Electronică de Calcul a Institutului Politehnic din Timișoara). Its design was started in 1956 by a team led by mathematician Iosif Kaufmann, electronic engineer Wilhelm Löwenfeld and student Vasile Baltac.

Out of the 1,700 members of the Romanian Academy, from 1866 until 2016, 102 members come or have worked in Banat and the surrounding areas. Among them are Traian Vuia, the inventor of the first tractor monoplane, Traian Lalescu, one of the fathers of integral equations, Dumitru Prunariu, the first Romanian to fly in space and Stefan Hell, winner of the 2014 Nobel Prize in Chemistry.

In the second half of May, biannually, the Timișoara branch of the Romanian Academy organizes, collaborating and involving the local academic, cultural and scientific community, the Timișoara Academic Days.

== Healthcare ==
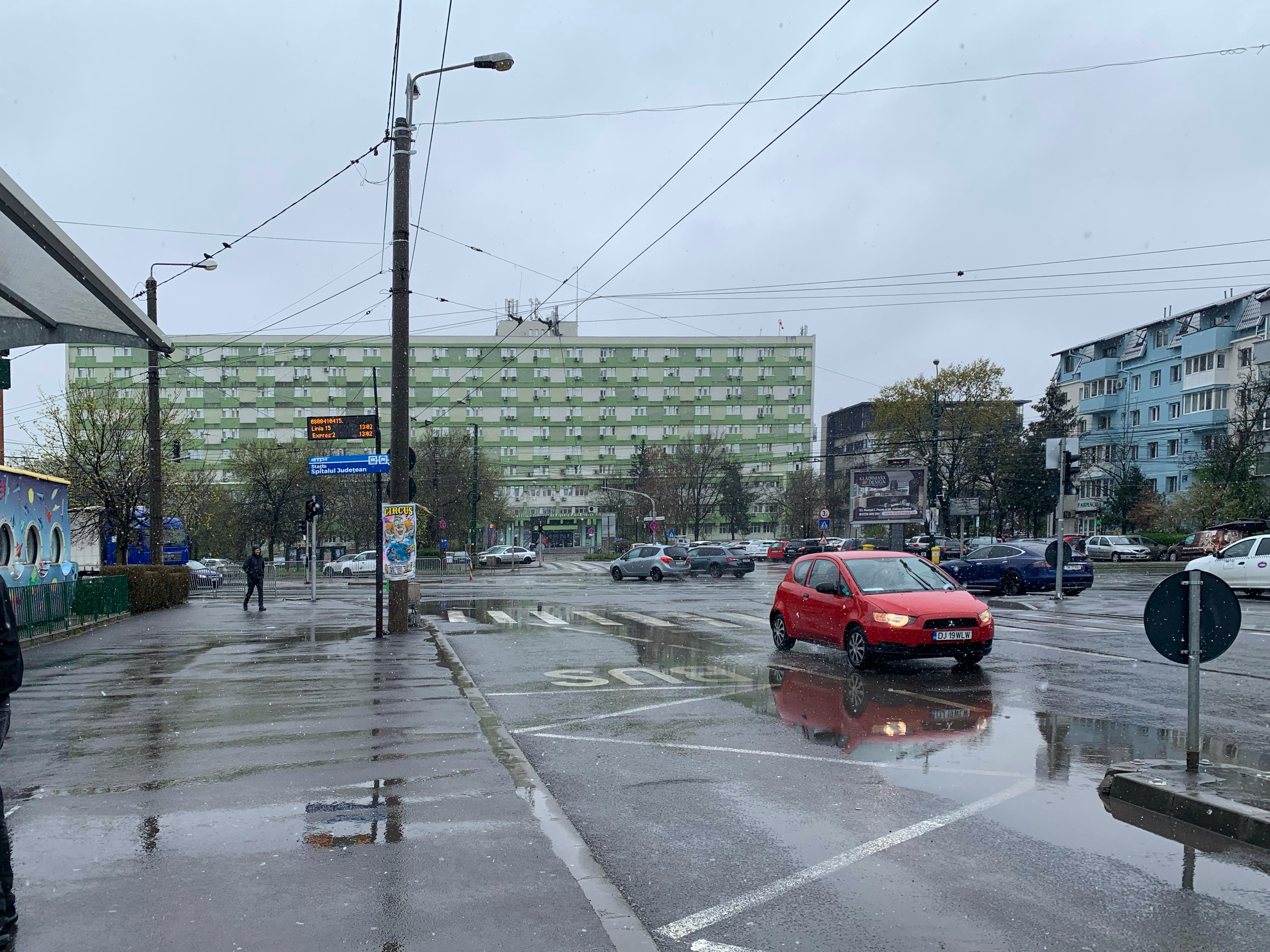
The County Emergency Clinical Hospital

Due to the specialized university programs, Timișoara is a research center in the fields of medicine and public health; there are branches of the Academy of Medical Sciences and the Student Society of Surgery, the headquarters of the Romanian Hemophilia Association, the Romanian Society of Medical Informatics and the Romanian Society of Pediatric Otorhinolaryngology, as well as the regional training center in emergency medicine, operated by SMURD.

In Timișoara there are eight hospitals, seven publicly owned and one private:

- Pius Brînzeu County Emergency Clinical Hospital (included by the Ministry of Health in the first class of competence);
- Institute of Cardiovascular Diseases (first class);
- Municipal Emergency Clinical Hospital;
- Louis Țurcanu Emergency Clinical Hospital for Children;
- Victor Babeș Clinical Hospital for Infectious Diseases and Pneumophtisiology;
- Victor Popescu Military Emergency Clinical Hospital;
- CF Clinical Hospital;
- Première Hospital (the largest private hospital in western Romania, owned by Regina Maria health network).

There are also: six integrated specialized outpatient clinics (four public and two private); three ambulance services (one public and two private); 494 dental offices; 229 family medicine offices; 138 specialized offices; seven medical expertise offices and 24 work capacity recovery offices; 39 school dispensaries; 11 student dispensaries; a sports dispensary; 63 pharmacies and 32 pharmaceutical warehouses.

== Transport ==
Timișoara is an important regional road and railway hub, connecting the city to Bucharest and other major cities, as well as Romania to Hungary and Serbia, and further to Western Europe. It is located along the Pan-European Corridor IV linking Germany to Turkey and has access, thanks to the Bega Canal, to the Pan-European Corridor VII. Furthermore, Timișoara is crossed by two TEN-T core network corridors: Orient/East–Med and Rhine–Danube (waterway focus).

=== Road transport ===
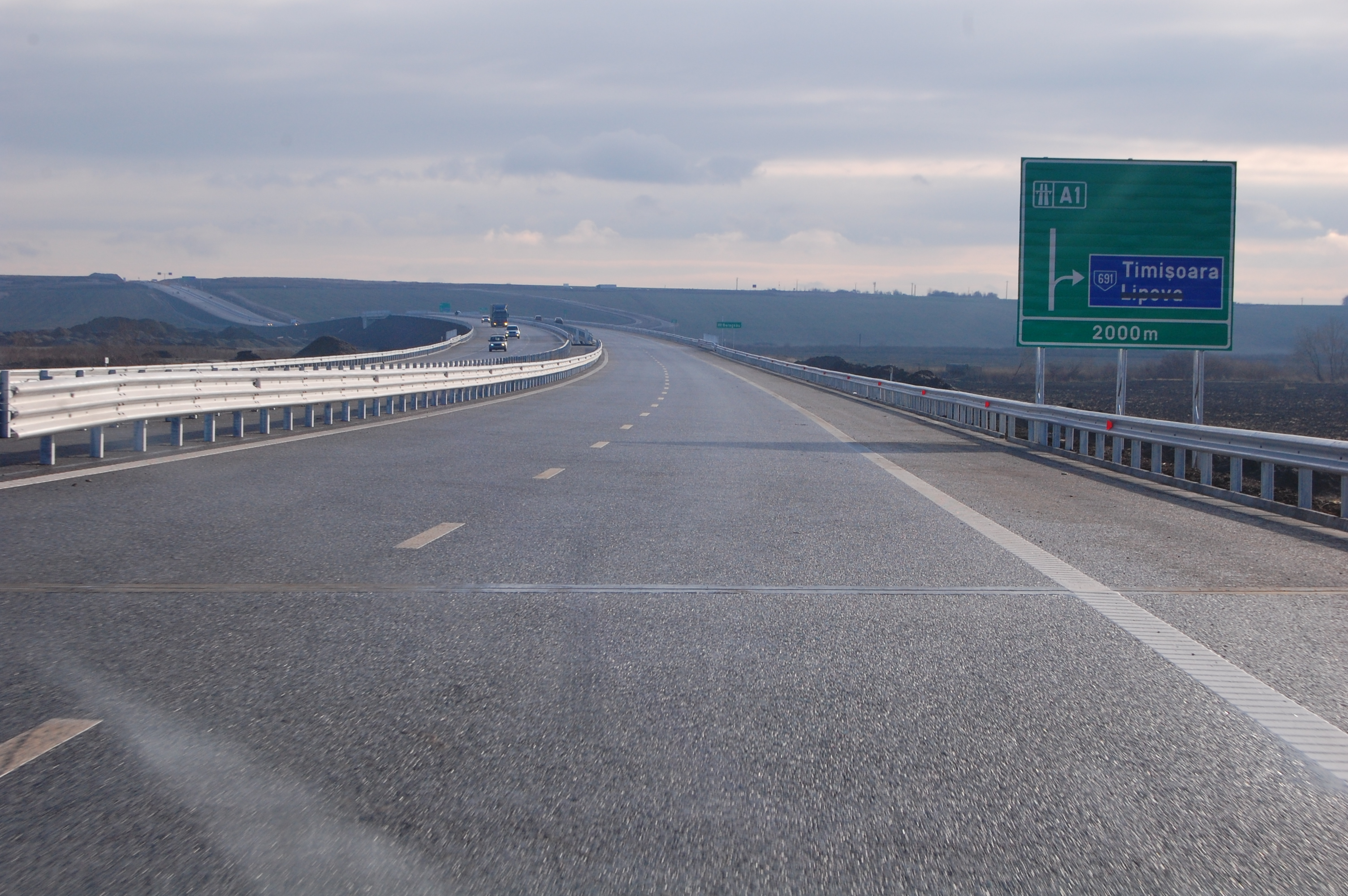
A1 motorway near Timișoara

The street plot of Timișoara is composed of 1,278 streets totaling almost 750 km (470 mi). The street network is based on a radial model, consolidated by a series of five concentric rings, none of them completely built. Unlike other cities of similar size, there is no predominant corridor in terms of loading, with traffic volumes distributed fairly evenly across a series of radial and circular arteries. The shape of the road network outside the city is web-like, all the main roads in the county converging towards the capital city.

In the northern part of the city there is a bypass; its southern extension is currently under construction. The city is crossed in the northeast by the A1 motorway, a segment that continues with the M43 motorway in Hungary. The A1 is connected near Lugoj to the A6 motorway, which is under construction.

Timișoara is connected to the European and national road network by the following roads:

- European route E70 – to the border with Serbia through the Moravița customs;
- European route E671 Timișoara–Satu Mare;
- national road 6 – to the border with Hungary through Cenad customs;
- national road 59 – with branch DN59A, to the border with Serbia through Jimbolia customs;
- national road 69 Timișoara–Arad.

Locally, car transport experienced a boom after 1990, so that in 2017 the degree of motorization in Timișoara was among the highest in Romania, with one car for every 2.66 inhabitants. Timișoara has one of the most extensive infrastructures for charging electric cars and plug-in hybrids in Romania, with 16 stations located throughout the city and a hub in 700 Square.

=== Public transport ===
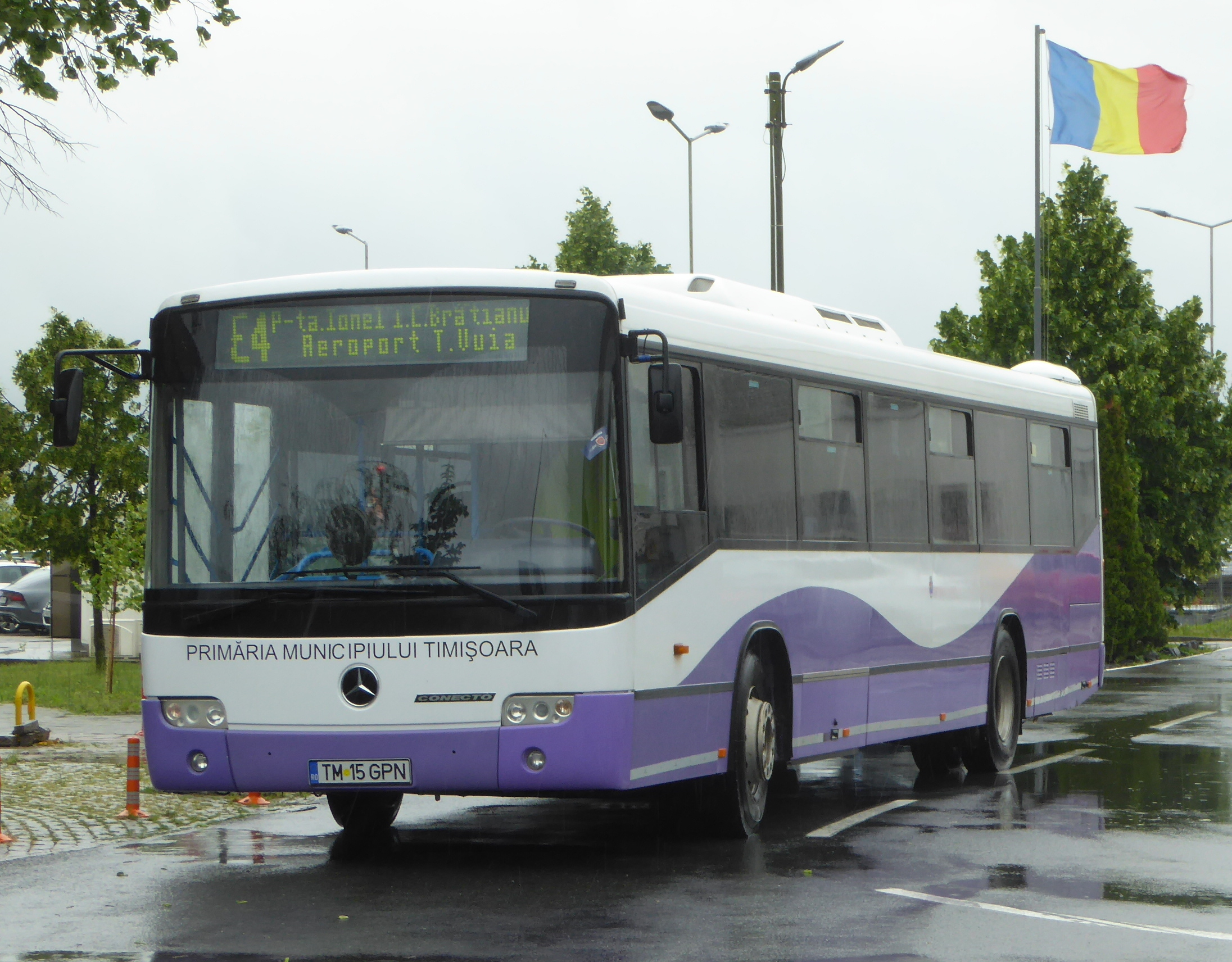
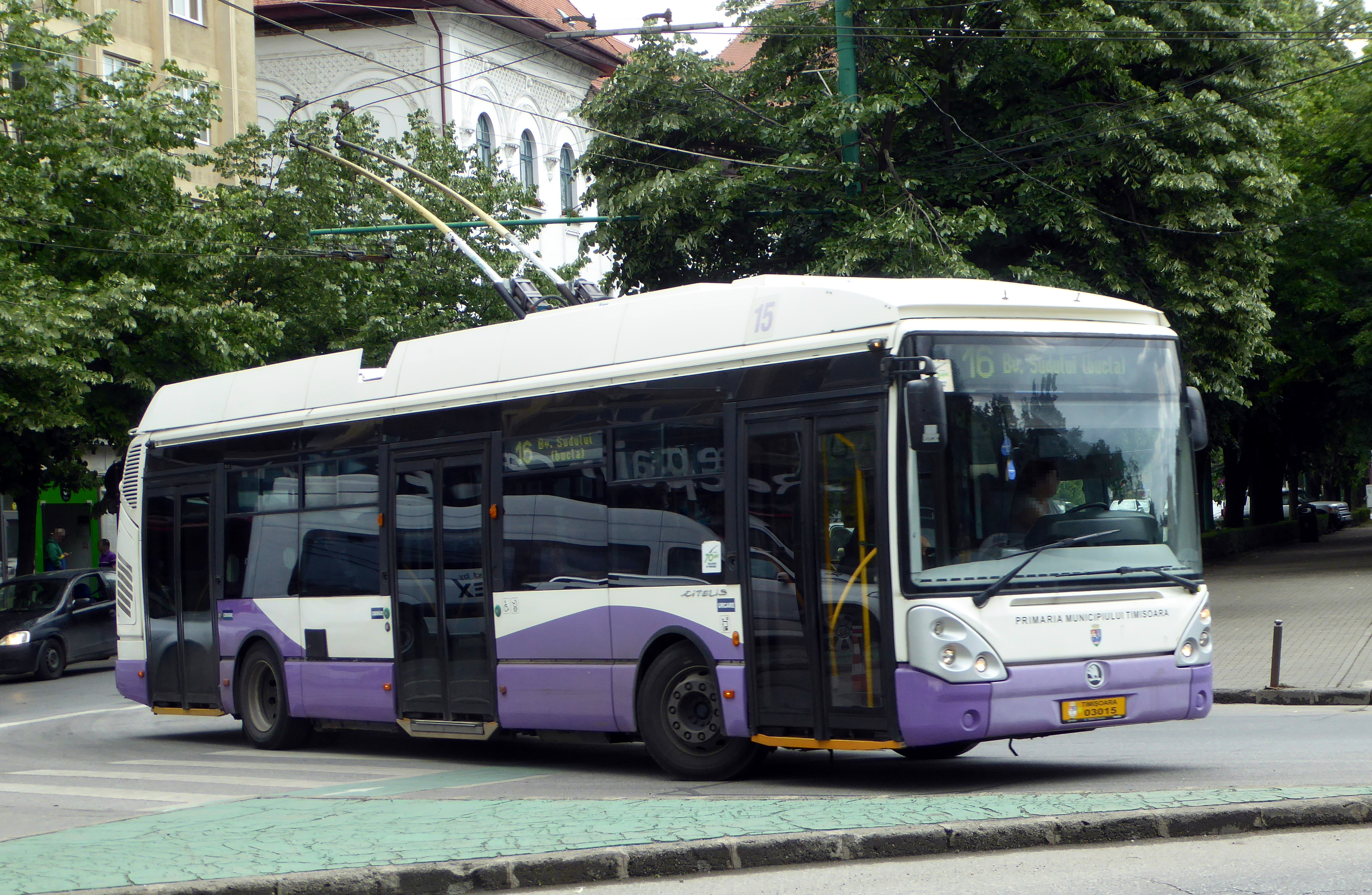
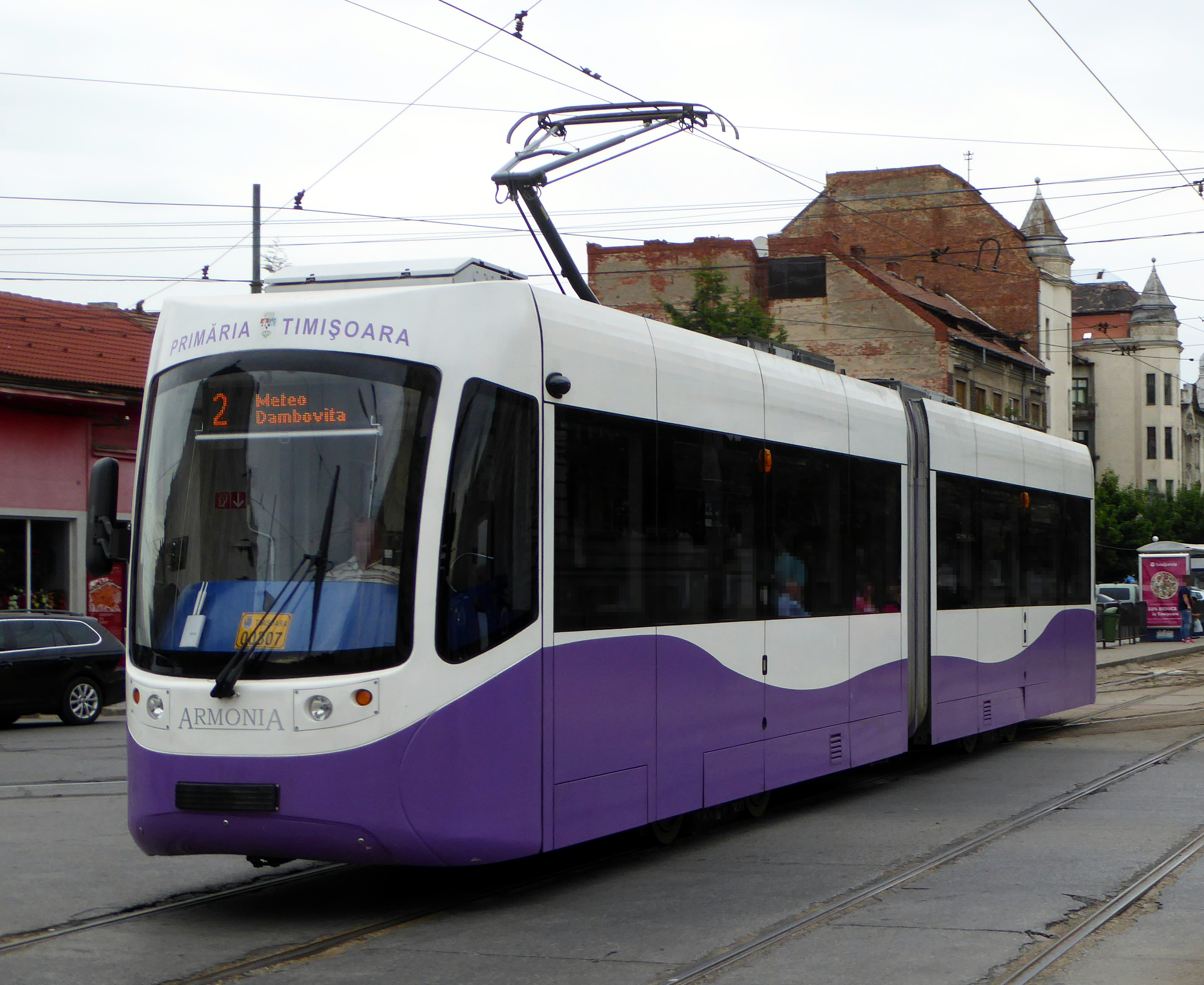
Bus, trolleybus and tram in characteristic white and purple

Timișoara's public transport network consists of nine tram lines, eight trolleybus lines and 31 bus lines and is operated by STPT (Societatea de Transport Public Timișoara). The network covers all the important areas of the city and it also connects Timișoara with some of the communes of the metropolitan area. 45% of urban public transport is served by trams, 22% by trolleybuses, 18% by buses and the remaining 15% by water buses and alternative means of transport. In 2019, Timișoara became the second city in Romania to introduce public school transport, after Cluj-Napoca; as of 2020, it is served by 14 lines.

Timișoara has a well-developed market for taxi services. There are also several car rental companies. Alternatively, short- and long-distance carpooling platforms operate in Timișoara, such as Uber, Bolt or BlaBlaCar.

For internal coach transport there are several coach stations, most located around the Timișoara North railway station and on Stan Vidrighin Way. There are also daily coach trips to destinations in Europe, served by private passenger transport companies, such as Atlassib, Eurolines or Flixbus.

=== Rail transport ===
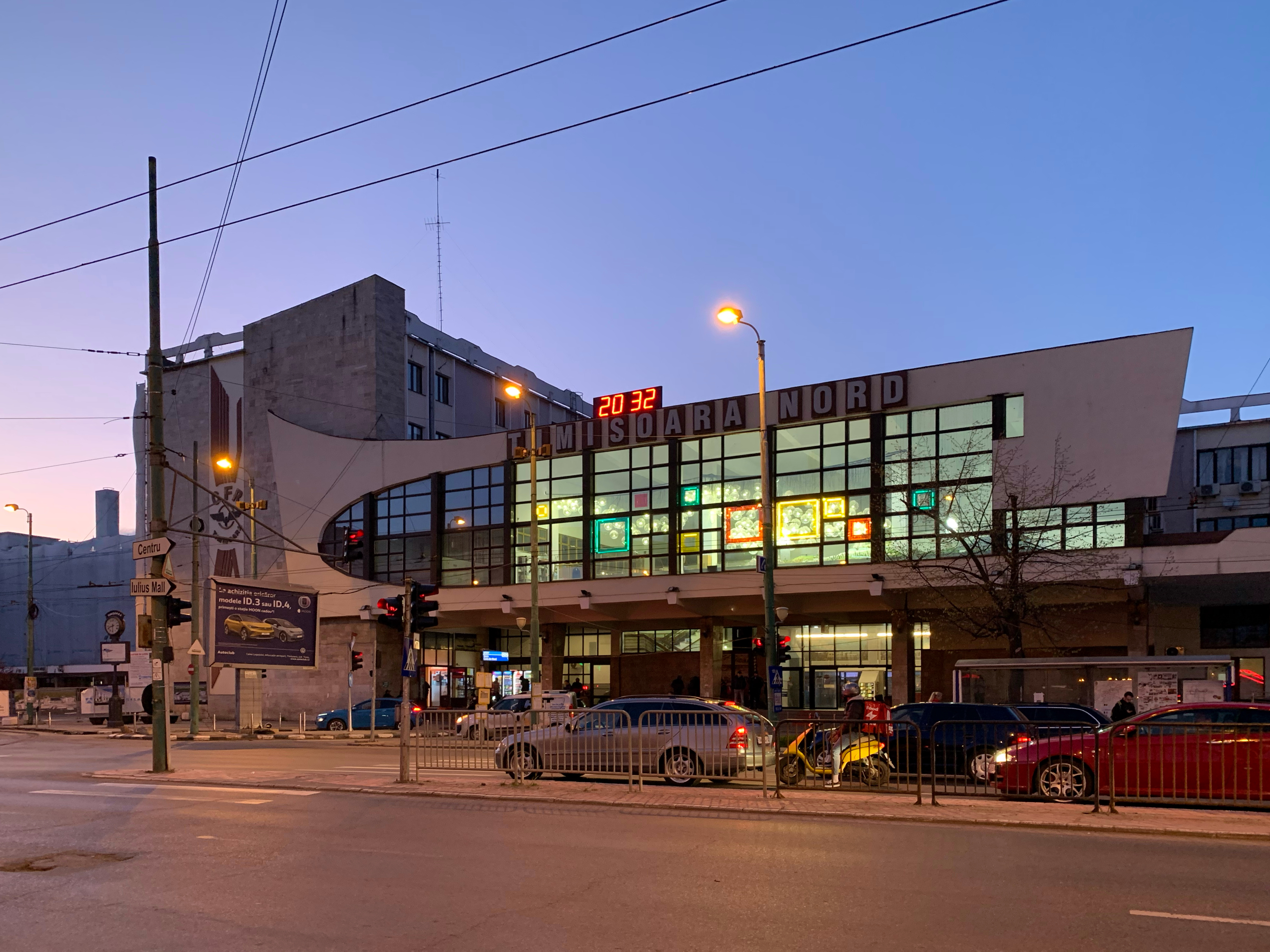
Timișoara North railway station

Timișoara has the oldest and the densest railway network in Romania, with over 91.9 km (57.1 mi) of lines for 1,000 km^{2} (390 sq mi) of territory, although some of the components are no longer operational due to low demand and lack of maintenance. Therefore, Timișoara is the most important rail hub in Timiș County and in western Romania. Most of the railway lines that intersect in Timișoara are secondary lines; the most important are line 900 from Bucharest, with international connections to Serbia and the main line Timișoara–Arad–Oradea, which ensures the connection with line 200 (Brașov–Sibiu–Arad–Curtici) and, implicitly, with Hungary.

The city has five stations (Timișoara North, Timișoara West, Timișoara South, Timișoara East and Timișoara CET) and a triage station (Ronaț Triaj). The main passenger station is Timișoara North, built in 1897 and undergoing extensive rehabilitation since 2021. The old station building, built in neoclassical style, was badly damaged by the Allied bombing of 1944, so it was rebuilt in socialist classical style. Timișoara North is one of the busiest stations in Romania, with an average of 174 passenger trains/day and a flow of 5,530 passengers/day.

Although the nature of freight traffic has changed, decreasing the requirement for maneuvering and recomposing trains, Timișoara is an important center for rail freight transport; there are several large industrial concerns that receive and ship goods by train.

=== Air transport ===
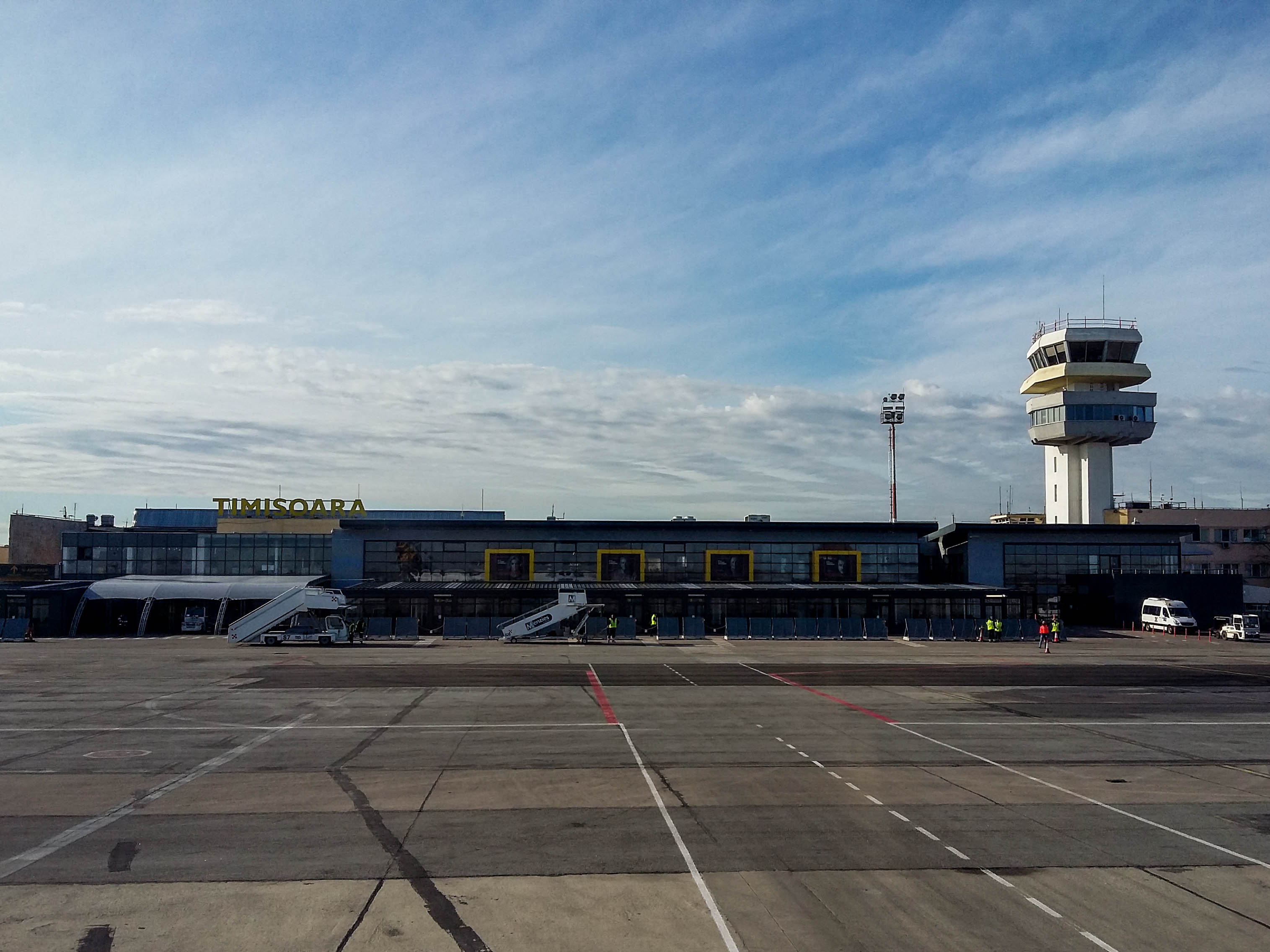
Traian Vuia International Airport

Located 12 km (7.5 mi) from Timișoara, in the northeastern part of the city, Traian Vuia International Airport is the fourth-busiest Romanian airport in terms of passenger numbers (~1.2 million in 2022) and the most important air hub in the DKMT Euroregion. In 2017, it became the first airport in Romania certified by EASA. In 2018, Traian Vuia International Airport attracted 15.1% of the total number of passengers embarked at Romanian airports, 32.8% of the total tons of goods loaded and 13.2% of the total number of flights. Traian Vuia International Airport serves as an operational base for Wizz Air. As of 2021, the airport is undergoing expansion works, by adding two terminals – internal arrivals and external departures – and creating an intermodal center for freight transport.

The city's first airport, the Cioca Airfield, had remained in use for recreational and utility aviation.

=== Water transport ===
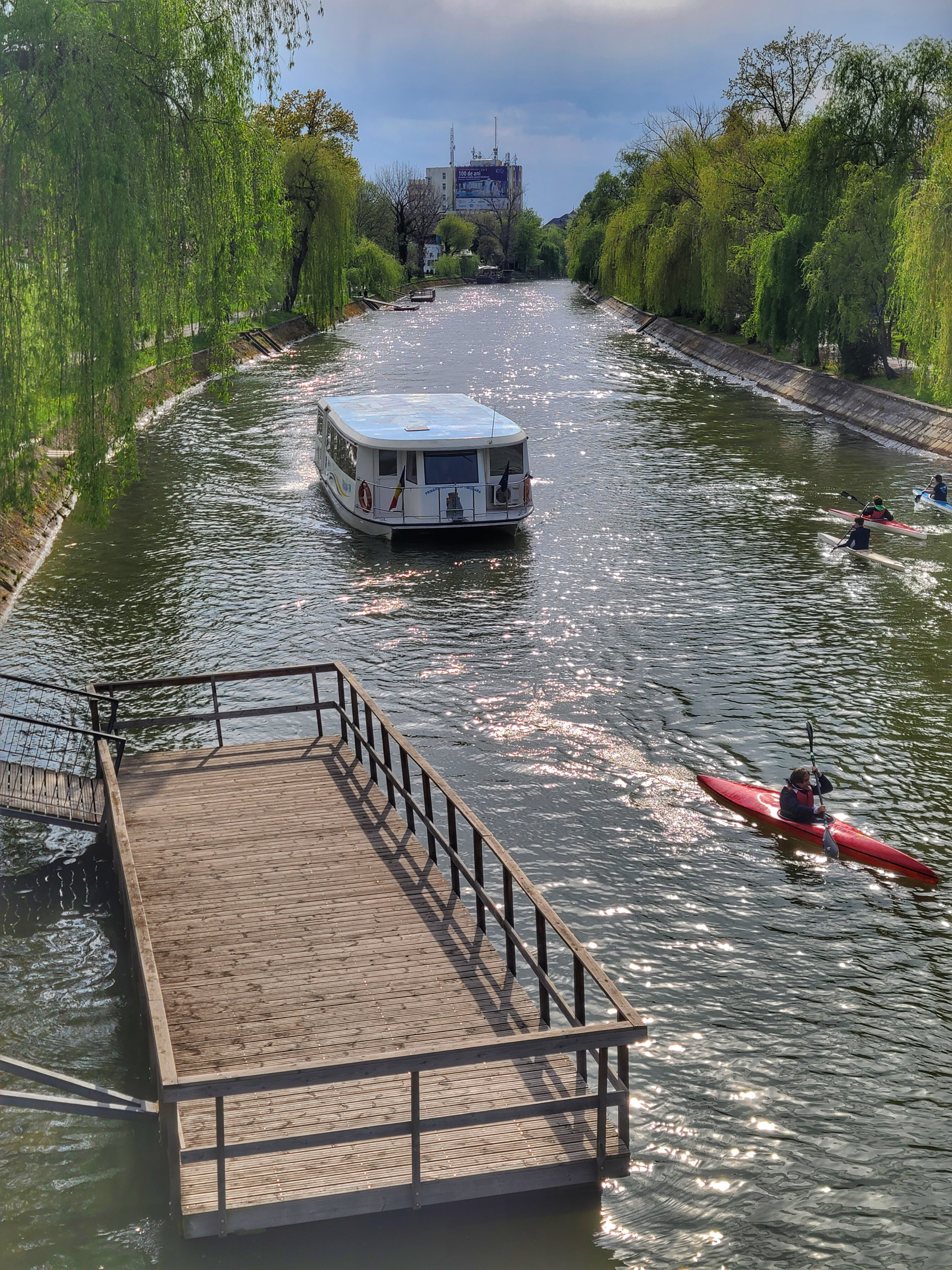
Vaporetto and kayaks on the Bega

The Bega Canal is the first navigable canal built in Romania, connecting Timișoara with the Serbian town of Titel. Its total navigable length was 114 km (71 mi), of which 33 km (21 mi) on the Romanian territory. In 2018, repair works were started on the navigation infrastructure of the Bega Canal, which would allow the resumption of naval traffic between Timișoara and Serbia, halted in 1967.

Since 2018, Timișoara is the first Romanian city with urban public transport by water, made with vaporetto-like boats on a single line with six stations.

=== Cycling and micromobility ===
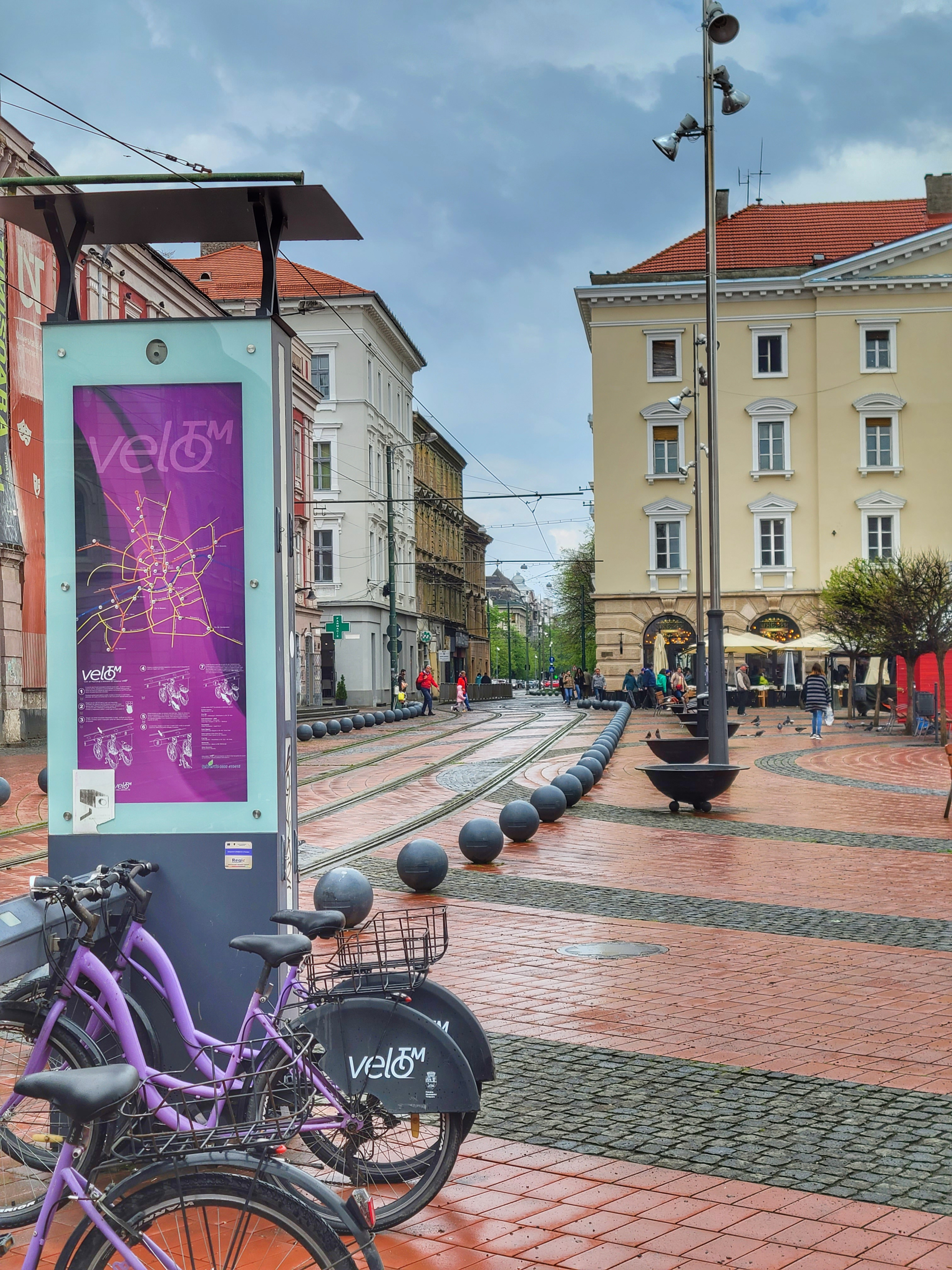
VeloTM bike sharing station in Timișoara

Timișoara has the most developed integrated cycling system in Romania. Cyclists have access to more than 100 km (62 mi) of bike lanes, including 37 km (23 mi) outside the city via the Bega Canal cycle path, which connects Romania with Serbia, providing a direct connection to the European network of cycling routes – EuroVelo. Timișoara is the first city in Romania with a public bike-sharing system, VeloTM, inaugurated in 2015. The system has 440 bicycles in the 25 stations in the city and, depending on the season, is accessed by 1,000–1,500 people daily.

In 2019, Timișoara introduced public transport with e-scooters.

== Architecture ==
Art Nouveau 20th-century palaces in Timișoara

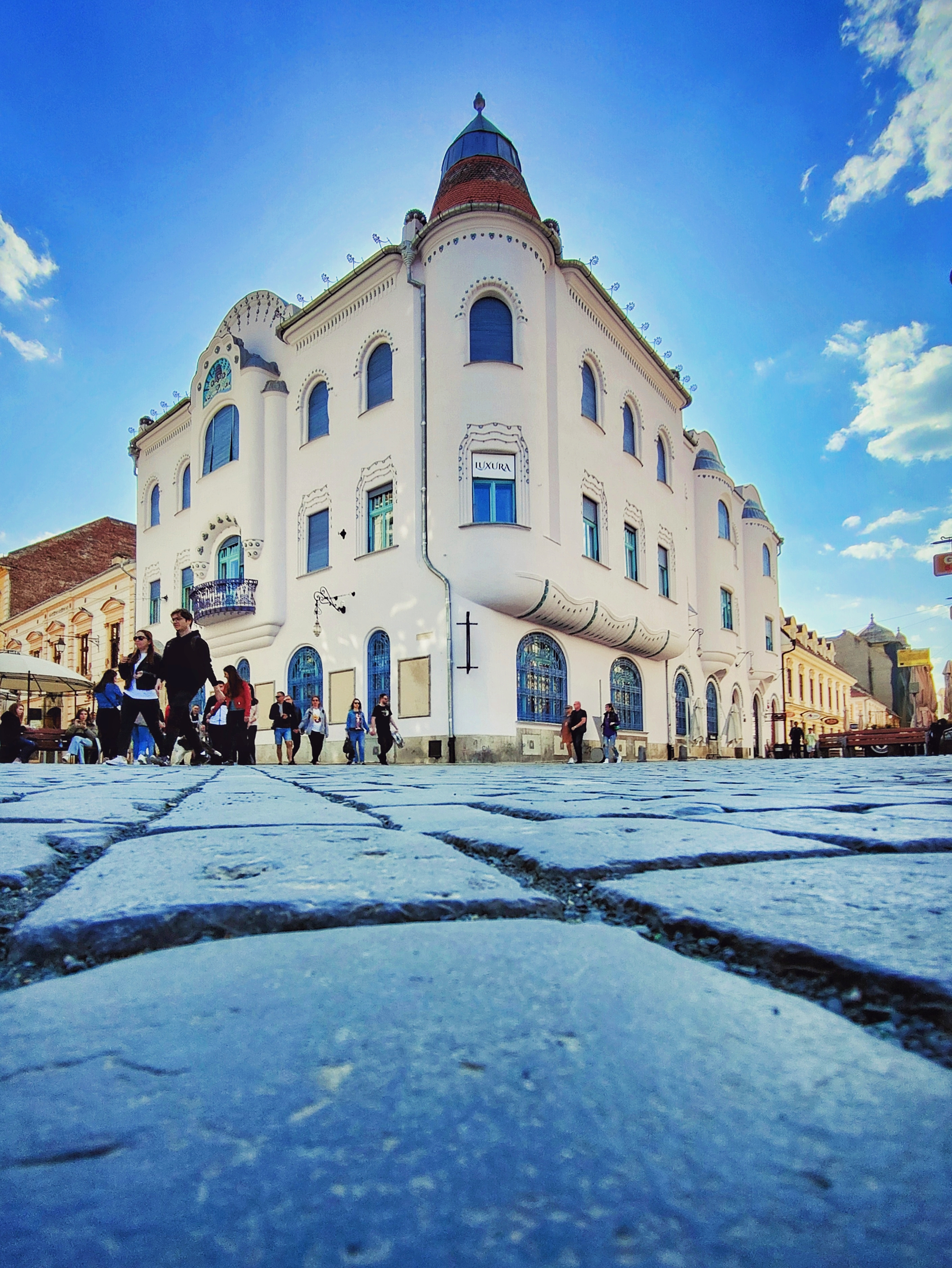
Steiner Palace (former Discount Bank)

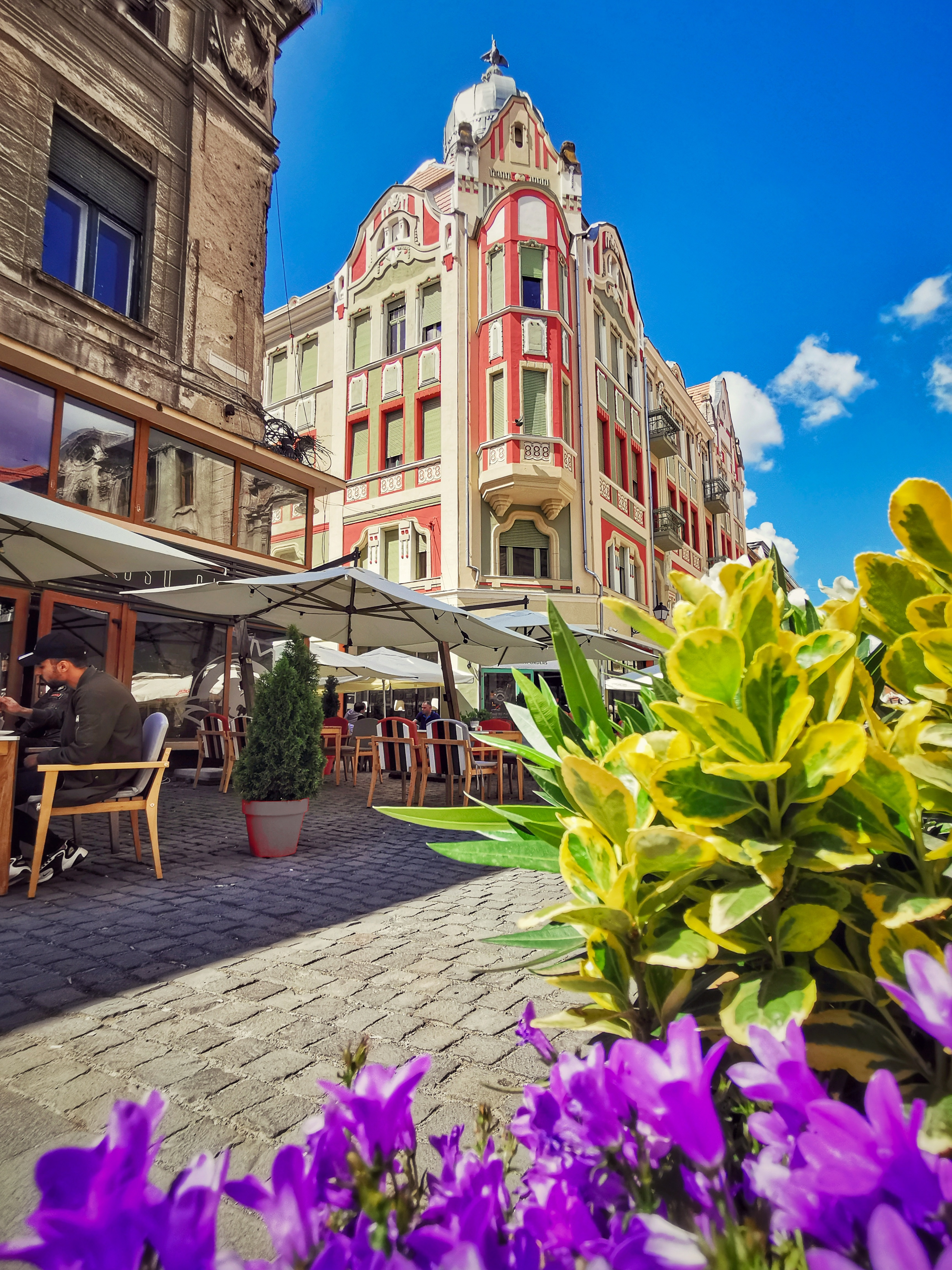
Gálgon Palace ("Rooster Building")

Timișoara has the largest architectural ensemble of historic buildings in Romania (around 14,500), consisting of the urban patrimony of the neighborhoods of Cetate, Fabric, Iosefin and Elisabetin. Most of these buildings are part of the imperial heritage, a period of economic prosperity that left its mark on the city. The architectural diversity, represented by baroque, historicism, neoclassicism, Art Nouveau and Wiener Secession, earned Timișoara the nickname "Little Vienna". The oldest building in Timișoara is Huniade Castle, which today houses the Museum of Banat. Destroyed during the siege of 1849, the castle was later rebuilt, but still retains elements of the former castle built by John Hunyadi between 1443 and 1447, but also elements from the period of Charles I of Hungary.

Timișoara is a city with a polynuclear urban structure. The current urban structure, the result of historical evolution, is relatively clear: in the middle of the urban agglomeration is the historic center (Cetate neighborhood) around which the other neighborhoods revolve. Due to their independent development, they have distinct features both functionally and architecturally. The center of today's Timișoara is the "successor" of the Austrian military fortress built mostly between 1732 and 1761. Today, only a few parts of the old city wall remain standing, namely the Theresia Bastion in the east and a few others which are located on the western limit of the old city wall. These were later listed as part of the architectural heritage of Timișoara.

Timișoara is regarded as a city with strong potential for densification, thanks to its numerous vacant lots and buildable areas located right in the city center—an advantage that other cities of similar size in the country lack. As a result, the city experienced few major demolitions during the communist era and has largely retained its original radial-concentric urban structure.

=== Historic neighborhoods ===
==== Cetate ====
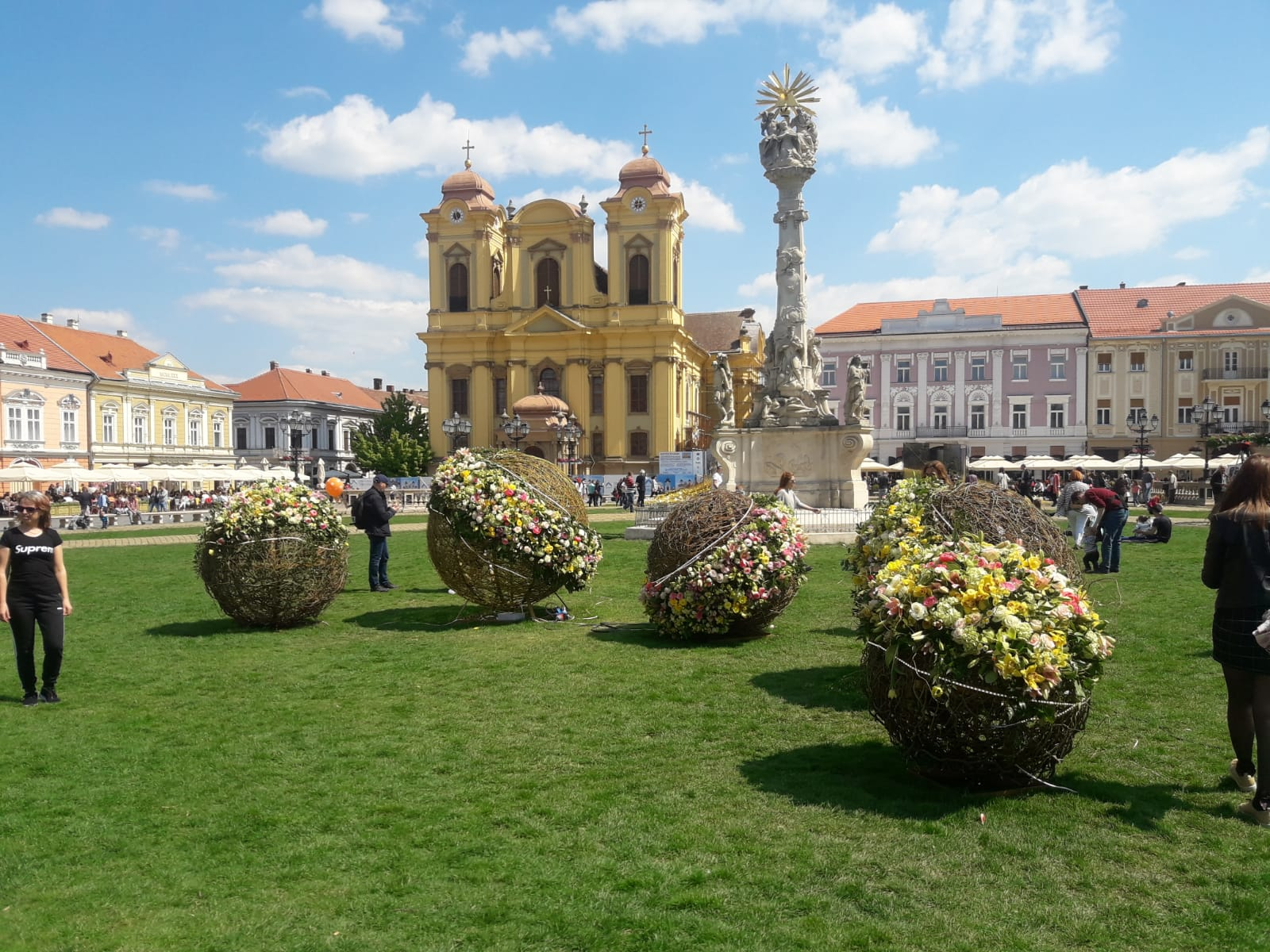
Union Square

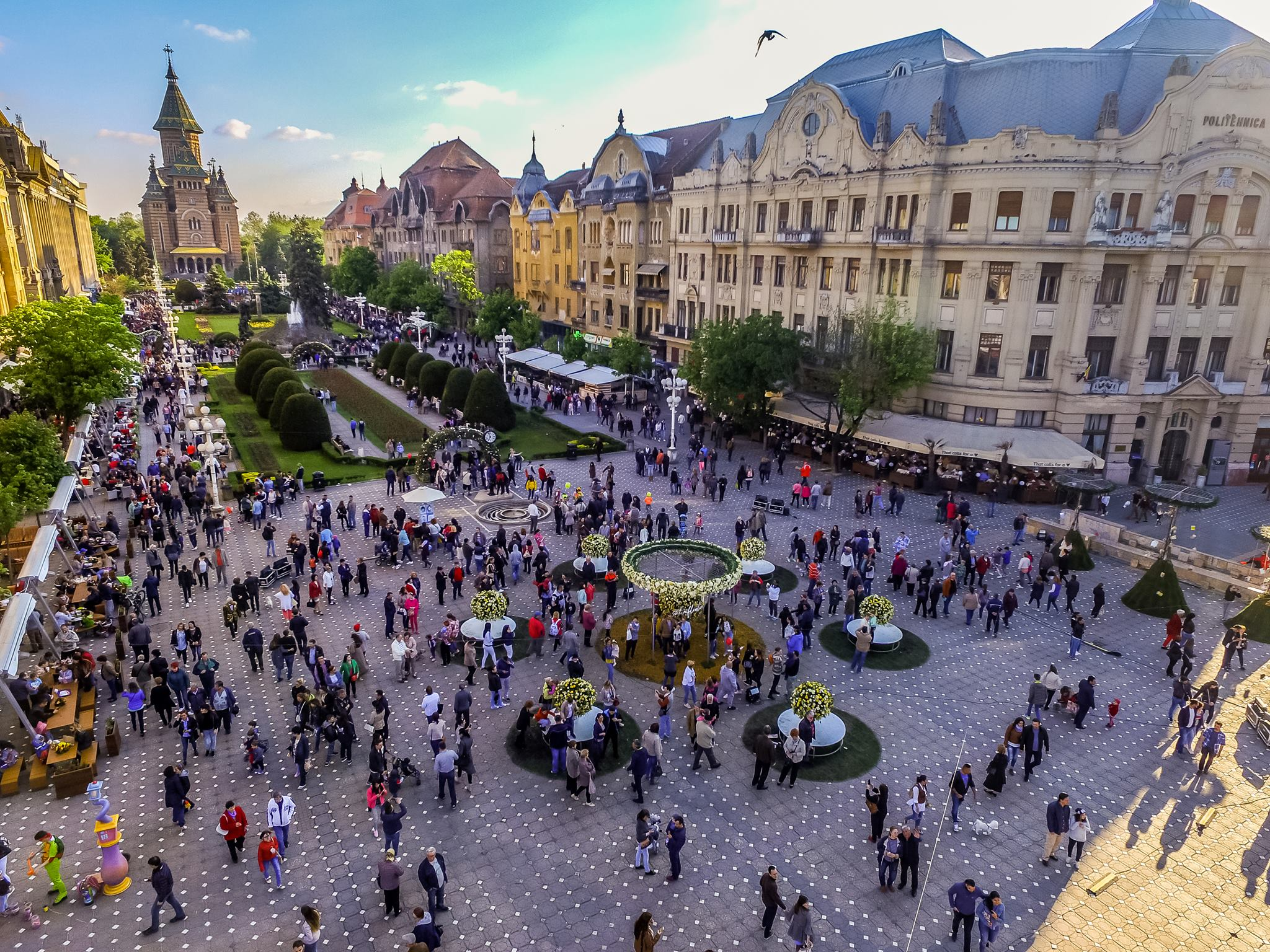
Victory Square

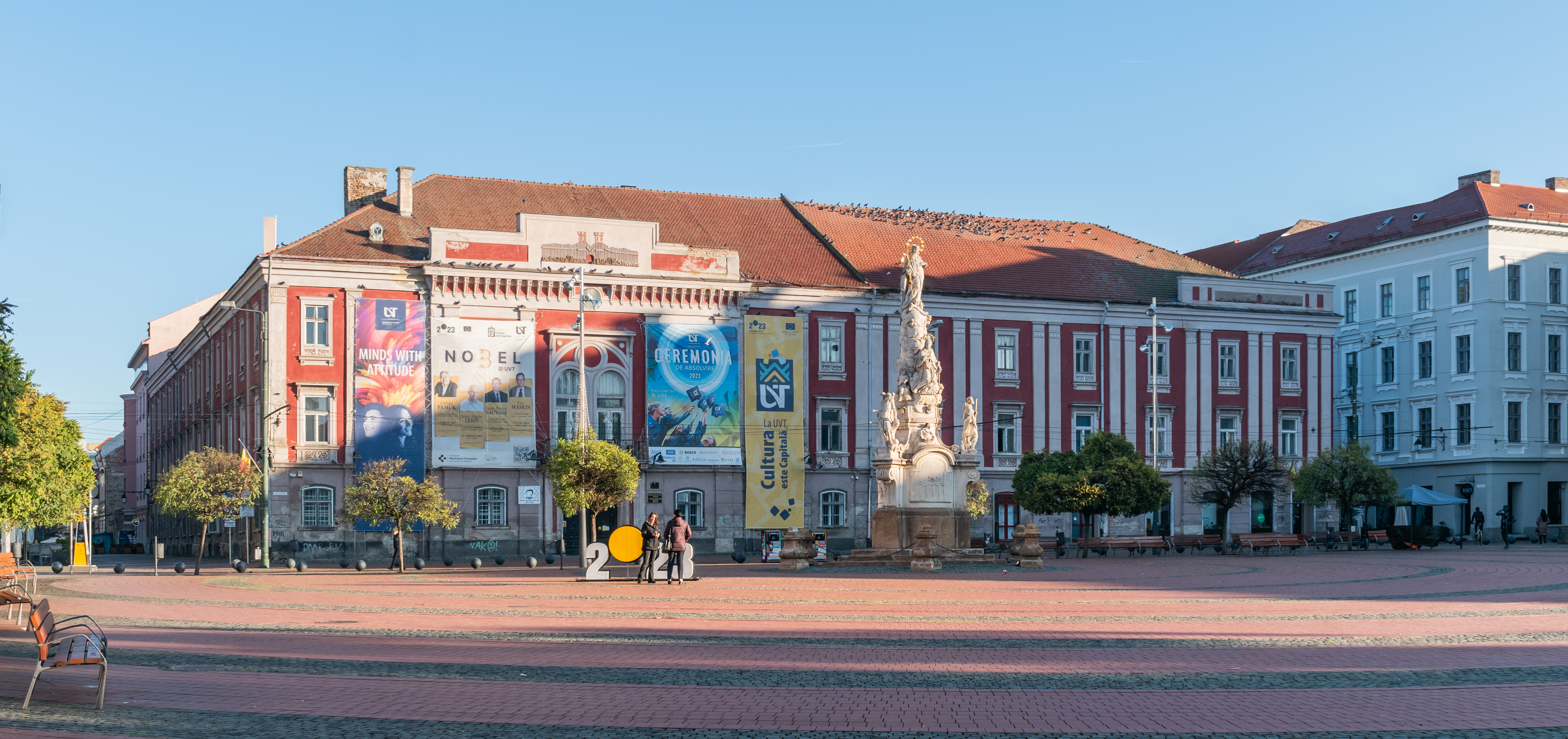
Liberty Square

The Cetate neighborhood, the political, administrative and cultural center of Timișoara, is divided into two distinct urban areas. The first area is the "inner city" of the 18th and 19th centuries. The whole area has the status of heritage site. The area houses the oldest buildings of the city, dating from the 18th century. The second area was established after 1900 on the lands liberated by the demolition of the fortifications. Construction in this area followed the trend at the time, the fin de siècle style. The Secessionist school of Banat was influenced by both Austrian and Hungarian styles, resulting from the direct participation of some architects from Budapest on various representative buildings. This style underwent two different stages: the first occurred approximately between 1900 and 1908 and was similar to Art Nouveau, with floral and curvilinear decorations, while the second, which continued until World War I, saw simpler, larger buildings with geometrical designs, similar to Viennese architecture at the time. Due to the fact that secessionism existed in Timișoara only between 1900 and 1914, its influence on more modest buildings was not as strong as that of eclecticism. If eclecticism became a true art of the masses, used in all buildings, secessionism remained a style of the elites, which penetrated Banat through cult architecture.

The historic center of Timișoara has a system consisting of three urban squares, unique in Romania, each square presenting different sizes, plastic solutions and architectural styles. Union Square (Romanian: Piața Unirii), built in baroque style, is the oldest square in Timișoara. It is also called Dome Square (Romanian: Piața Domului), because it houses the Roman Catholic Dome, built in 1774. The middle of the square is dominated by the Plague Column. On the southern side of the square is the Baroque Palace, designed after the Palais Kinsky in Vienna, which today houses the Art Museum. On the western side are the Serbian Orthodox Cathedral and the Serbian Orthodox Episcopal Palace, representative of the neo-Serbian style.

Victory Square (Romanian: Piața Victoriei), also known as the Opera Square (Romanian: Piața Operei), is the central square of Timișoara. The entire square was designed by the then chief architect László Székely, educated in Budapest, but a great admirer of Austrian architecture. The square was completely pedestrianized in the late 1980s, with the removal of tram rails. Spatially, the square stretches between the Metropolitan Cathedral and the Palace of Culture which houses the National Theater and Opera. Although built around the same time, the two belong to diametrically opposed styles. The Opera building was built in Renaissance style. Today, only its sides retain this style, the facade rebuilt after a fire in the neo-Byzantine style characteristic of Romanian interwar architecture. The Metropolitan Cathedral is the largest religious building in Timișoara and the second tallest church in Romania, after the People's Salvation Cathedral in Bucharest. It stands out for its massiveness, having no less than 11 bell towers and architectural style, unusual for a 20th-century building, inspired by the architecture of Moldavian monasteries. The promenade side from the Opera to the cathedral is called Corso and houses several 1900s style palaces (Lloyd, Neuhaus, Merbl, Dauerbach, Hilt and Széchenyi); the opposite side, Surogat, houses two palaces (Löffler and Chamber of Commerce) and several modernist blocks of flats. In the middle of the square are the statue of the Capitoline Wolf and the fountain with fish.

To the north of Victory Square is Liberty Square (Romanian: Piața Libertății). Formerly called the Parade Square (Romanian: Piața de Paradă), the square houses several buildings with military functions: the Garrison Command, former Chancellery of War, the Military Casino, etc. The Military Casino is built in baroque style with some Rococo influences. The other buildings are in the classic style, in the 1900s style – szecesszió movement and in other styles. Liberty Square is the pedestrian link between Union Square and Victory Square. In the extension of the Liberty Square there is a smaller square, St. George Square (Romanian: Piața Sfântul Gheorghe), known in the past as Seminar Square (Romanian: Piața Seminarului). Its eastern side was formed by the Jesuit Church, transformed into a mosque during the Ottoman occupation and demolished during the modernization works provided in the urbanistic plan of 1911 (in its place was built the Szana Bank). The walls of the former church were brought to the surface in 2014. The square is dominated by the equestrian statue of Saint George fighting the dragon, built in 1996. It is one of several monuments erected in the 1990s in parts of the city where people were killed during the Romanian Revolution. In this square, the first horse-drawn tram was set in motion in July 1869.

==== Fabric ====
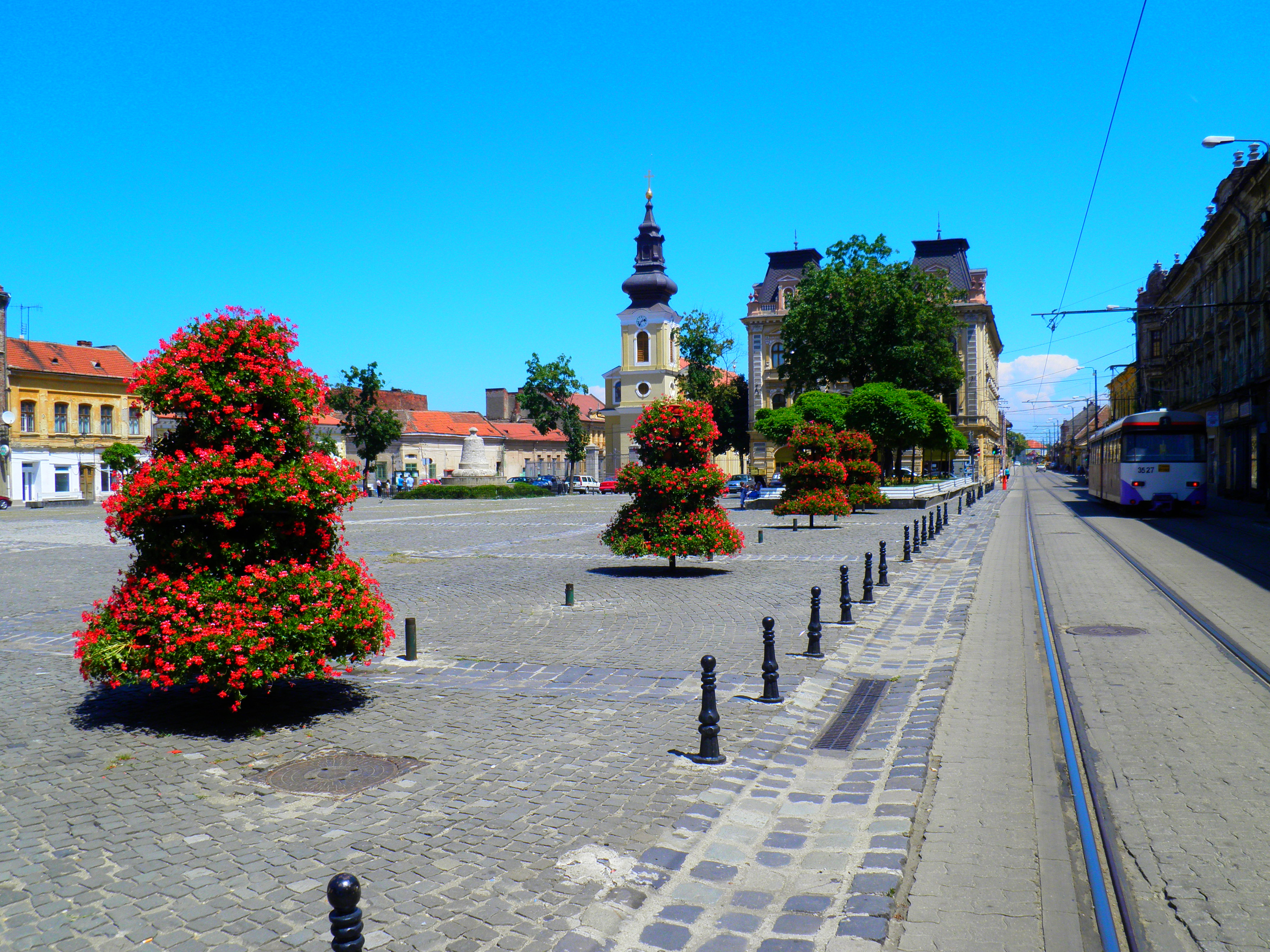
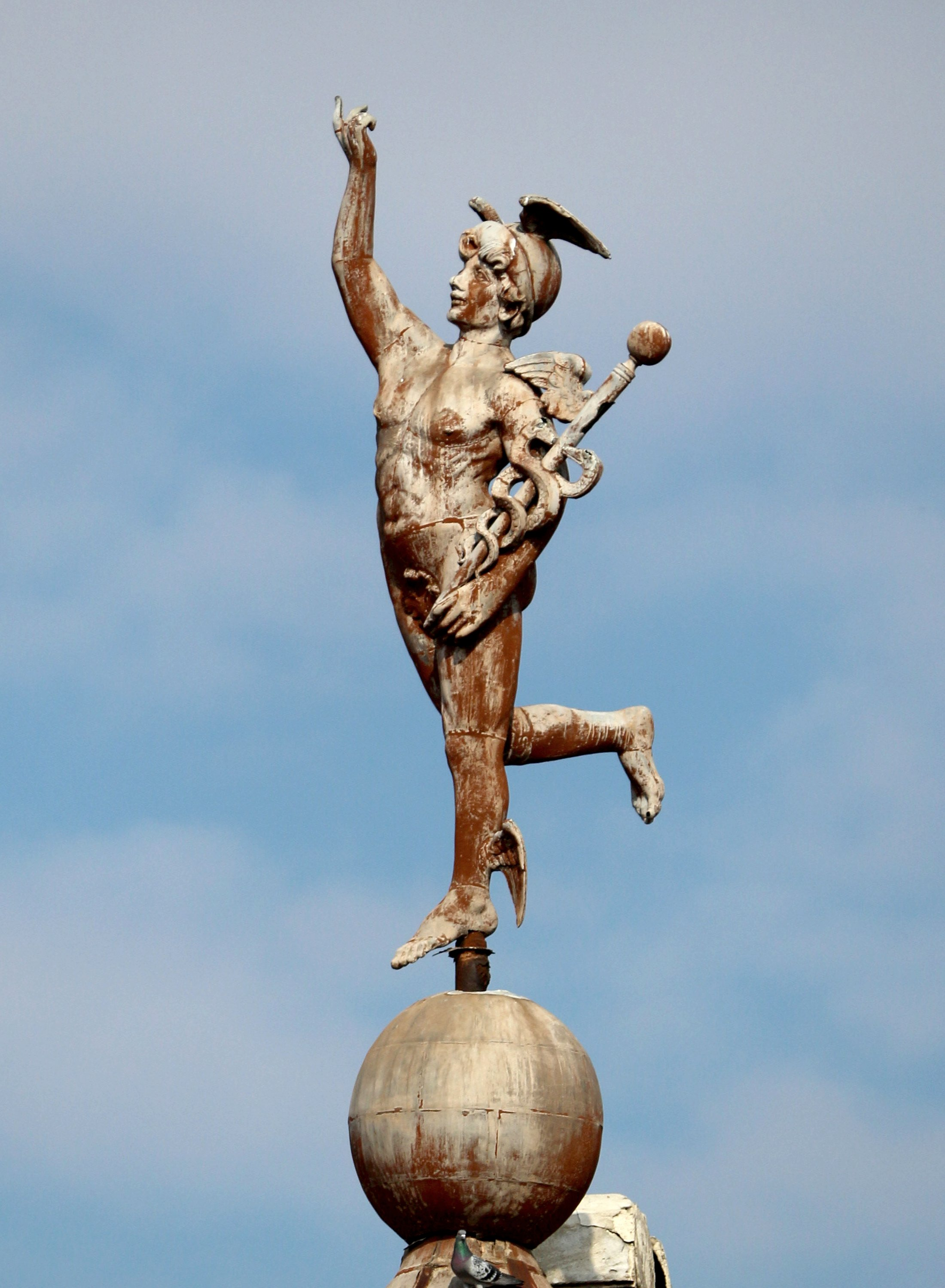
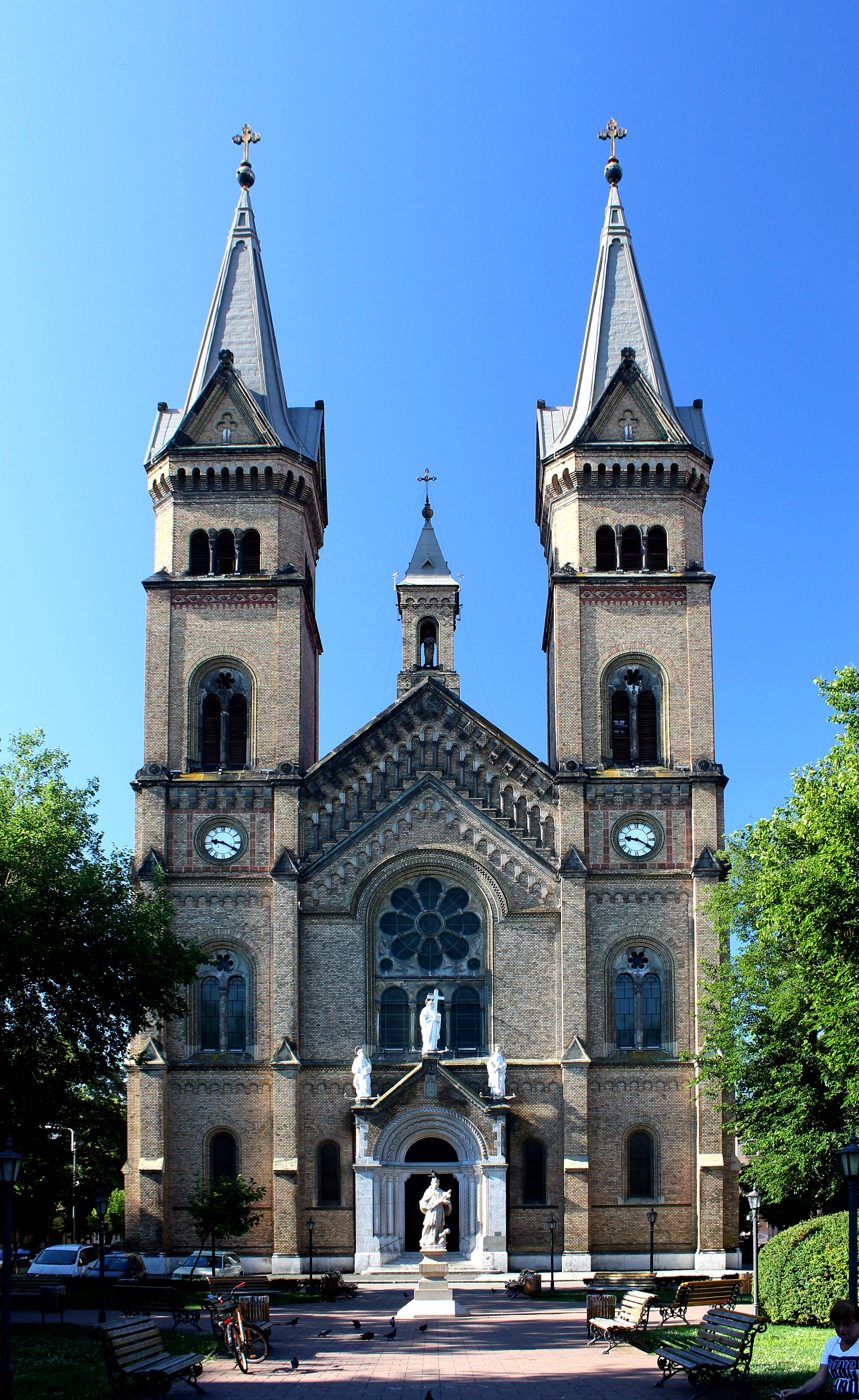
Left to right: Trajan Square, Mercury Palace statue and Millennium Church

The Fabric neighborhood has earned its name from the many manufactories, workshops and guilds established here. The neighborhood is bordered by the Neptune Baths, the Timișoara East railway station, the waterworks and the Timișoreana breweries. In the center of the neighborhood is Trajan Square (Romanian: Piața Traian). This is a smaller replica of the Union Square; both are rectangular and flanked on the eastern side by a religious building. The oldest building in Trajan Square is the Serbian Orthodox Church, built between 1745 and 1755 in the classicist style. Most of the buildings in the square were built at the end of the 19th century and belong to different movements of the Art Nouveau style. In Romans' Square (Romanian: Piața Romanilor) is the Millennium Church, a historicist building with neo-Gothic and neo-Romanesque elements.

==== Iosefin ====
The Iosefin Water Tower, a restored industrial landmark and cultural center

At the beginning, the Iosefin neighborhood had a rural character, with isolated houses, similar to the Banat Swabians plain villages. The houses had only one level and, for the most part, had facades decorated with pediments. The rural character of the neighborhood is maintained until 1857, when Timișoara is connected to the railway system of Central Europe. Then, in the northern part of Iosefin, the first railway station of the city was built. Apart from the St. Mary Catholic Church, which was built between 1774 and 1775, all the buildings in Iosefin are built after 1868, most of which were built around 1900. Thus, in this area, there are numerous buildings in eclectic historicist style, specific to the second half of the 19th century, as well as several architectural ensembles in the 1900s style with its specific stylistic derivations – Art Nouveau, Jugendstil or Secession. Representative for this style are the historical monuments from urban ensembles IV and V: the Water Palace, the Délvidéki Casino, the former House of Savings, the Anchor Palace, the twin palaces of Nándor and Tamás Csermák, the Notre Dame Church, the Water Tower, etc.

16 December 1989 Boulevard forms the traditional historical border between the Iosefin and Elisabetin neighborhoods. Along it are a series of Art Nouveau palaces (Besch–Piffl, Kuncz, Menczer, etc.), as well as the 1900s-style Fire Station. The boulevard divides Alexandru Mocioni Square (Romanian: Piața Alexandru Mocioni) into two unequal parts, the triangular one (formerly called Küttl Square and Sinaia Square) belonging to Iosefin. The square is flanked by the Orthodox Church, built in neo-Byzantine style and inspired by Hagia Sophia, in contrast to the Art Nouveau architecture of the surrounding buildings.

==== Elisabetin ====
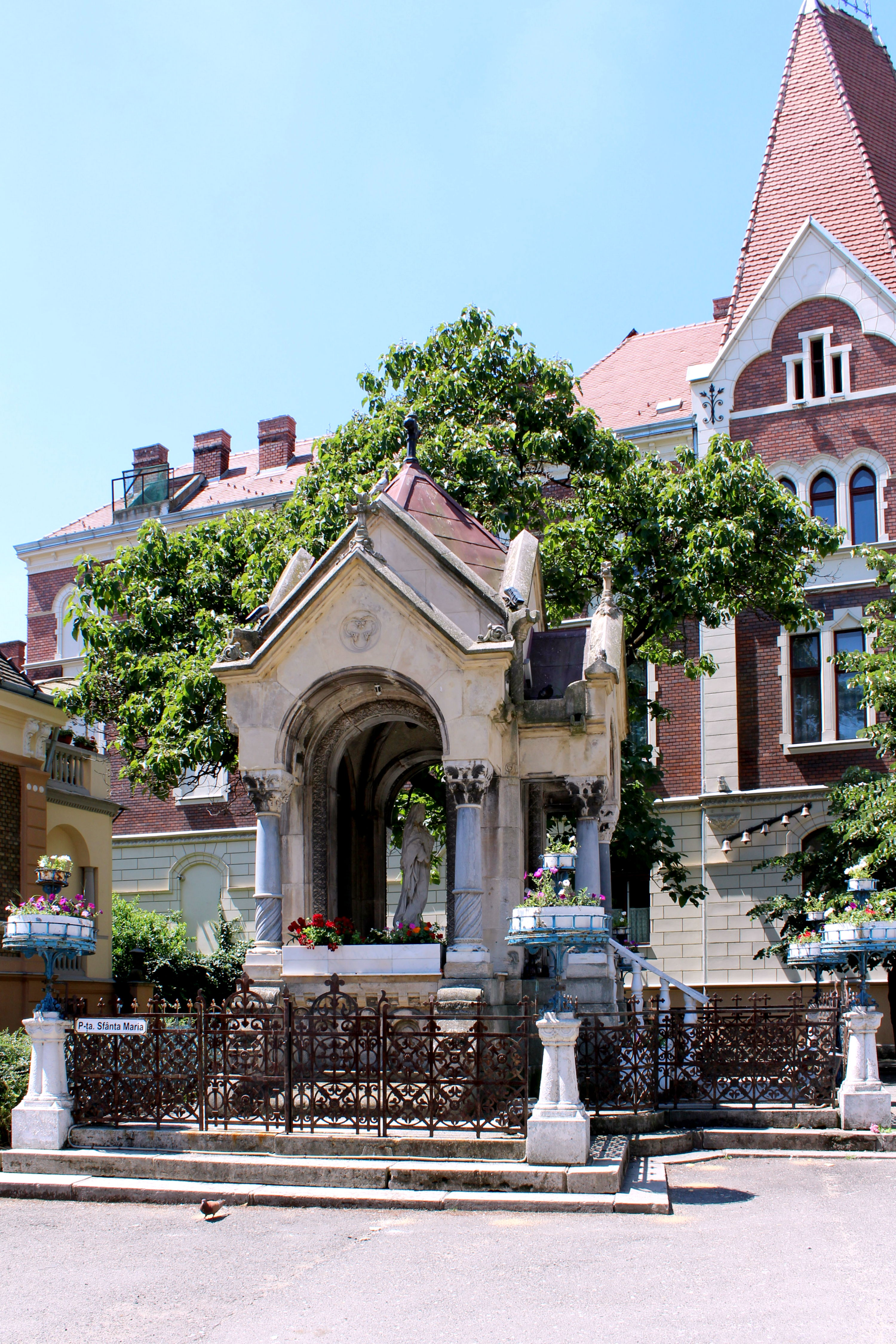
Virgin Mary Monument in St. Mary Square. In the background, the Reformed Community Palace

Like the Iosefin neighborhood, Elisabetin had a rural appearance for a long time. Only after 1892, with the dismantling of the military fortress, Elisabetin experienced a strong development. Only two buildings have been preserved in Elisabetin since the 18th century: Dissel House and the Orthodox Church in the Church Square, the oldest Romanian church in Timișoara. Although it is a protected historical area, the urban ensemble I of Elisabetin is affected by the so-called urban sprawl. Many ground floor houses, typical of the historical urban morphology of the neighborhood, have been transformed into multi-story buildings. The buildings in the urban ensemble VIII date from 1890 to 1900. Some belong to the classicist style, while others fall into the eclectic historicist style, especially the neo-baroque movement.

One of Elisabetin's squares of historical importance is Mary Square (Romanian: Piața Maria), dominated by the neo-Romanesque monument of St. Mary. According to tradition, György Dózsa, the leader of the peasant uprising of 1514, was martyred in this place. Other squares in Elisabetin are the Nicolae Bălcescu Square (Romanian: Piața Nicolae Bălcescu) with its 57-meter-high Catholic Church and the smaller Pleven Square (Romanian: Piața Plevnei), surrounded by an ensemble of Art Nouveau residential buildings (the House with Peacocks, the Szilárd House, the House with Beautiful Gate, etc.).

=== 1919–1947: Neo-Romanian architecture ===
The neighborhoods of individual villas, the houses with several apartments and the religious and socio-cultural endowments dating from the first half of the 20th century, especially from the interwar period, predominate in the interstitial spaces between the historic neighborhoods, giving the respective areas the aspect of a garden city.

The architecture of the new buildings erected in the interwar period kept some decorative elements widespread at the beginning of the 20th century, but the neo-Romanian style, then the modernist and cubist ones, became more and more popular. More and more projects have been entrusted to Romanian architects, from Timișoara or Bucharest. Outside the former walls of the fortress and in Elisabetin, numerous villas were built in which the influence of the modern style, of the Brâncovenesc style as well as the French influences are predominant, but also public buildings, emblematic for the new architectural line. In the interwar years, important buildings of the city were built according to the plans of the Bucharest architect Duiliu Marcu: the new facade of the Theater, the main building, the student dormitory and the laboratories of the Polytechnic Institute, the Capitol cinema, etc.

The neo-Romanian style was consciously promoted by the state. Like secessionism, the neo-Romanian style remained a style of elites that did not influence in any way the architecture of the more modest buildings that were built in large numbers in the interwar period.

=== 1947–1989: Socialist classicism ===
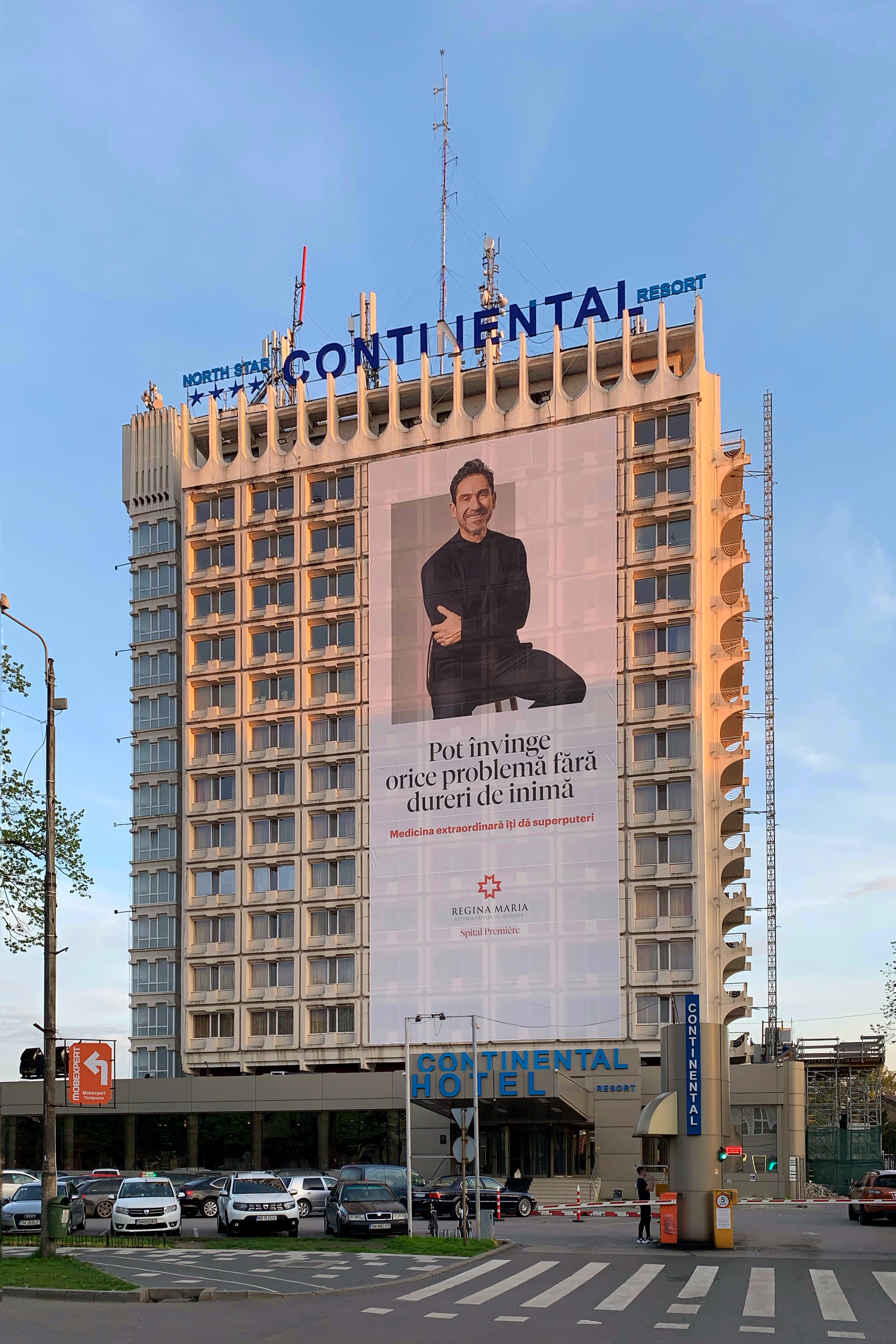
Opened in 1971, Continental Hotel is the first high-rise building in Timișoara.

During the communist period, like other cities in Romania, Timișoara strictly followed the Soviet style. The architects did not have creative freedom, because the ministry imposed a firm control and an austerity regime, with small budgets. The evolution of the postwar architecture of the city was strongly influenced by the activity of the architect Hans Fackelmann, who designed, among others, the West University, one of the first modern constructions in Romania and the Ion Vidu National Art College.

Despite the central policy of urban systematization, which saw entire historic neighborhoods demolished, such as the Uranus neighborhood in Bucharest, the Timișoara authorities did not demolish old buildings, but only "filled in", where there were no buildings. Thus were built the two blocks that close the front of Victory Square, on its eastern side, towards the Metropolitan Cathedral. In the late 1960s, the Communist Party called for the construction of a number of commercial venues, hotels, houses of culture, stadiums and sports halls in major cities. It was the period when the Bega store, the Continental and Timișoara hotels, the Youth House, the Modex fashion house, the Olimpia hall and others were built in Timișoara.

The communist era also meant the growth of the population of Timișoara, by moving the workers brought from all over the country. Thus arose the need for new neighborhoods. Between 1974 and 1988, huge bedroom neighborhoods were built, consisting of blocks of flats with four, eight or ten floors, made of large prefabricated panels. At the end of the 1980s, over two thirds of the population of Timișoara lived in such suburbs: Circumvalațiunii, Șagului, Lipovei, etc. The blocks had the technical-municipal installations necessary for housing, but they were poorly executed in the conditions of a pronounced economic decline.

=== Post-revolution architecture (1990–present) ===
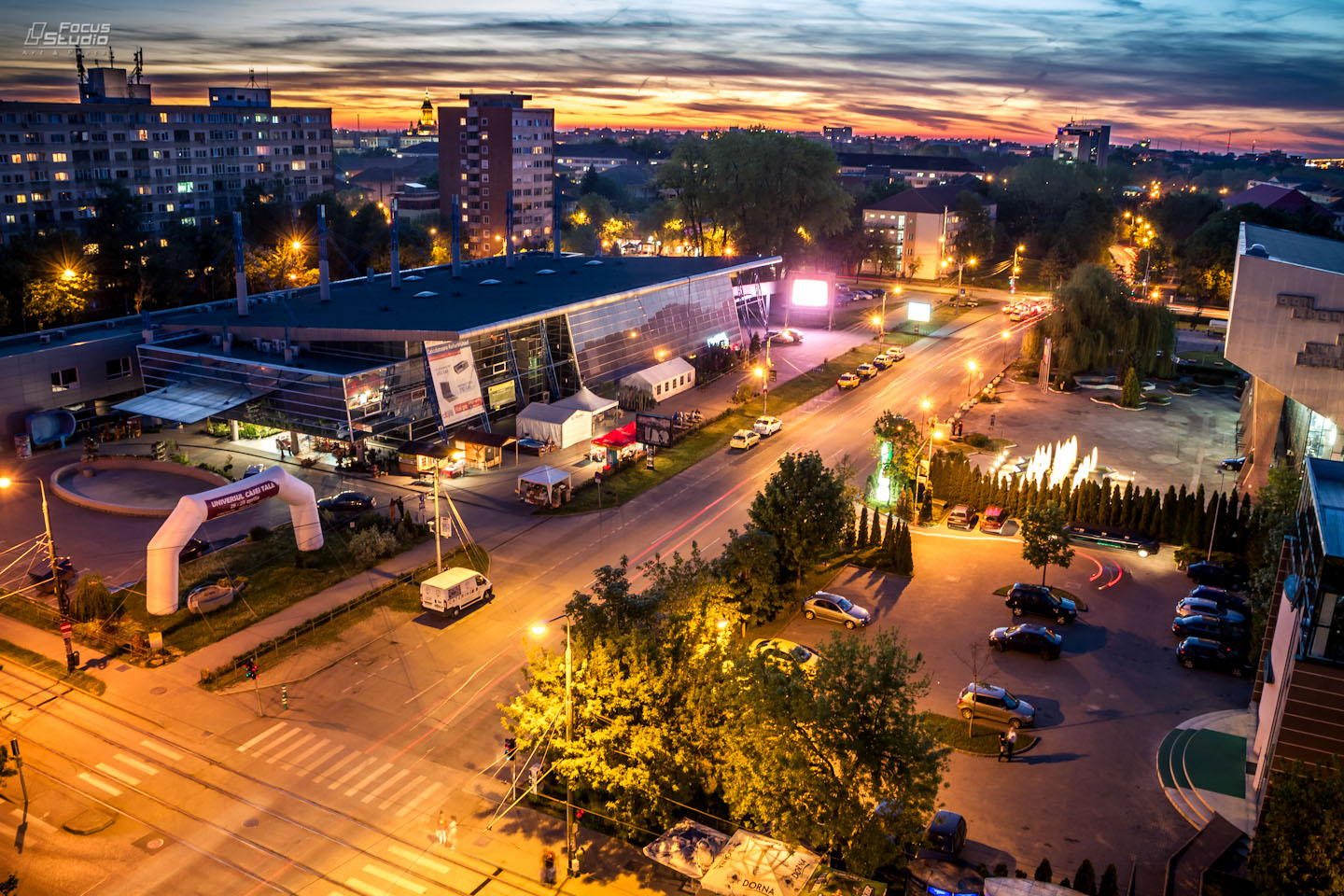
Regional Business Center

The reconnection, after 1989, of the Romanian architecture to the European architectural culture proved to be very difficult. Most of the projects and constructions did not yet have enough substance or inertially continued the decorativism of the previous period. Re-established in 1990 as a department within the Faculty of Constructions, the Timișoara school of architecture brought together architects from the late 1980s who, embracing the theoretical discourse of postmodernism, perpetuated the arts and crafts philosophy of the previous generation, either by a subtle return to historical tradition (Șerban Sturdza, Mihai Botescu or Radu Radoslav), or through a critical regional approach (Vlad Gaivoronschi, Ioan Andreescu or Florin Ionașiu). Constructions such as Austria House (Mihai Botescu), BRD Tower (Radu Radoslav), City Business Center (Vlad Gaivoronschi) or Reghina Blue Hotel (Ioan Andreescu) are linked to their names.

Similar to other Romanian cities, Timișoara underwent large-scale de-/reindustrialization and tertiarization after 1989, which shaped its current urban landscape. The 2008–2009 real estate crisis led to a change in the economic behavior of both investors and home buyers. Post-crisis, a number of peripheral real estate projects have been abandoned, and investors and home buyers have shifted their interest to the available plots within the city. As a result of the economic restructuring process during the 2000s, many industrial areas or isolated factories were demolished and their place was taken by residential complexes and shopping malls.

The 2010s represented a decade in which the city acquainted a period of urban development rebirth. Projects such as Iulius Town and ISHO were put on the map under the form of edge cities indicating the growth of the urban tissue and implicitly of the facilities of the city.

== Culture ==
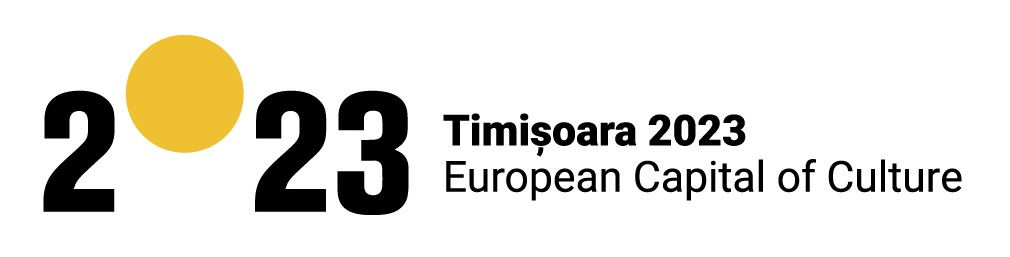
Logo of the 2023 European Capital of Culture

=== Visual arts ===
In Timișoara there are eight contemporary art galleries, five of which are publicly funded: the Pygmalion Gallery (House of Arts), the geamMAT Gallery of the Art Museum, the Helios Gallery (Fine Artists' Union), the Mansarda Gallery (Faculty of Arts and Design) and the City Hall Gallery.

=== Performing arts ===
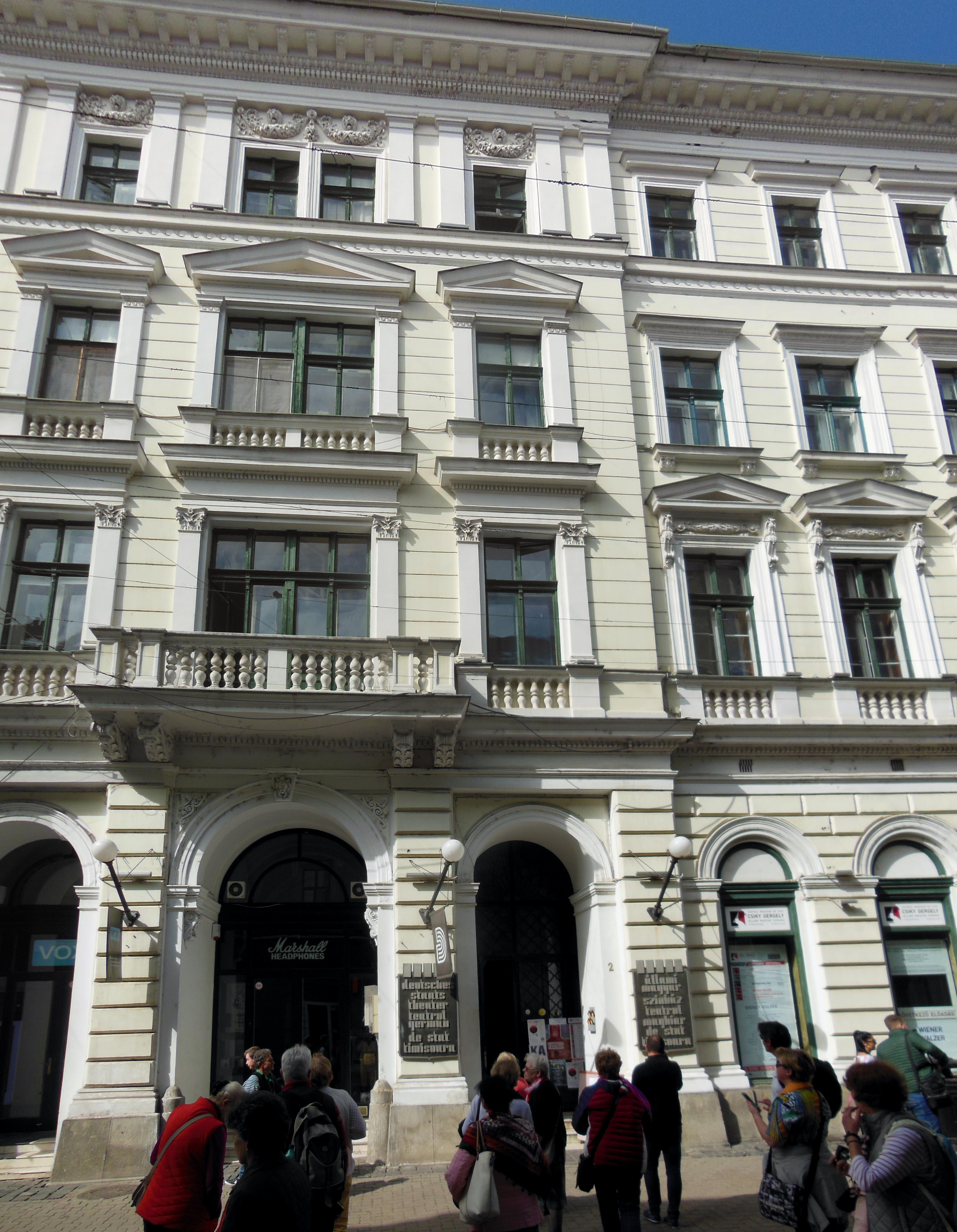
German State Theatre

Timișoara is the only city in Europe that has three state theaters in three different languages – the Mihai Eminescu National Theatre, the German State Theatre and the Csiky Gergely Hungarian State Theatre. The three theaters and the National Opera are housed in the Palace of Culture, built between 1871 and 1875 according to the plans of the Viennese architects Ferdinand Fellner and Hermann Helmer, who designed, among others, the Stadttheater in Vienna, the Népszínház in Budapest and the Opera Theater in Odesa. In 2012, the National Theater built and put into operation the Set Factory, the first professional production line of stage props and theater equipment in Romania. Since 2019, the Serbian language theater has been operating within the Merlin Puppet and Youth Theater.

The Romanian National Opera as an institution in its current form has existed since 1947, when the Giuseppe Verdi's opera Aida opened its first season, on 27 April.

=== Literature ===
Literary life has been revitalized in Timișoara over the last decade: open, public readings of prose and poetry have turned into social-literary experiments and two new literary festivals have been launched – LitVest and Timișoara International Literature Festival.

The literary society Aktionsgruppe Banat, founded by German-speaking authors of the Banat Swabian minority, was active in Timișoara between 1972 and 1975. Many of its members also activated in the Adam Müller-Guttenbrunn circle, which included, among others, Herta Müller, Horst Samson and Werner Söllner. A recognized literary figure of the underground in Timișoara in the 1980s, Herta Müller was awarded the Nobel Prize for Literature in 2009.

=== Music ===
Before having a proper musical society, in Timișoara there was the choral association Temeswarer Männergesangverein, founded in 1845. The repertoire of this choir included works of great popularity, belonging mainly to German romantic music. The Philharmonic Society was founded later, in 1871, as a men's choral society. The inaugural concert took place on 8 December and included the ballads Die Frithjof-Saga by Max Bruch and Der Taucher by Heinrich Weidt. Over the years, guest musicians of the Philharmonic Society were invited to perform in Timișoara, among them Franz Liszt, Johann Strauss II, Joseph Haydn, Pablo de Sarasate, Henryk Wieniawski, Johannes Brahms and Béla Bartók. The current Banatul Philharmonic was founded in 1947 by royal decree. The Philharmonic has been organizing the Timișoara Muzicală International Festival since 1968, the longest-running cultural festival in Timișoara.

=== Gastronomy ===
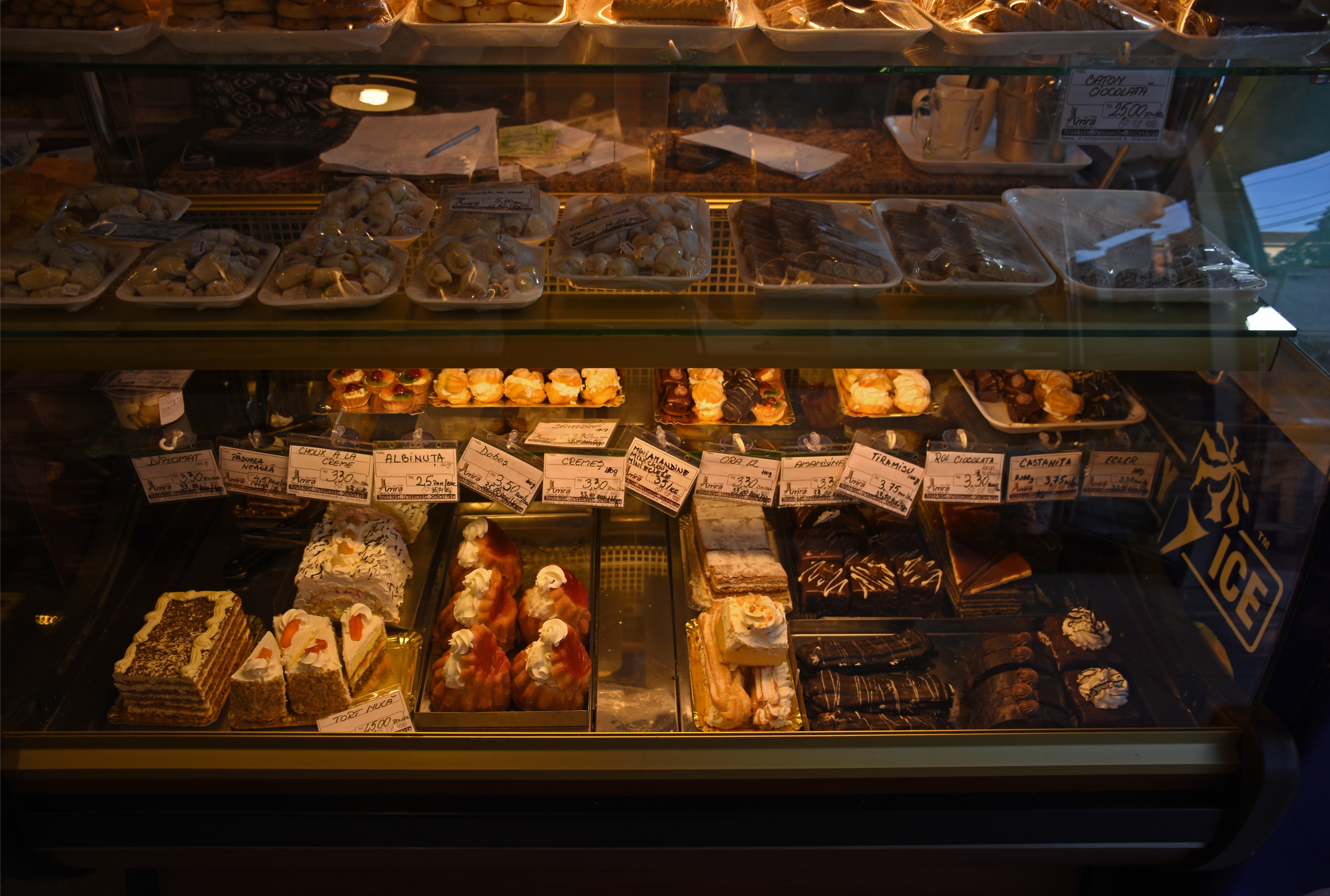
International desserts (e.g., chou à la crème, dobostorta, tiramisu, etc.) on display in a Timișoara store

The cuisine of Timișoara has been greatly shaped by Austro-Hungarian traditions, as well as by Greek, Italian, Turkish and French influences. In Banat, dishes are typically made with pork, chicken, beef, lamb, or fish, accompanied by vegetable sides fried in lard or oil. Flour-based sauces like rântaș are often used to thicken the dishes, which are generously seasoned with a variety of spices such as pepper, salt, thyme, paprika, rosemary, cumin, or aromatic herbs.

The cuisine of Banat as a whole is characterized by fatty, nutritious, and tasty dishes. Rasol with bone, steaks, paprikash, tochituri, goulash, aspic, stuffed peppers, fish brine, plachie, drob, soups, broths, sarmale, fresh pork prepared and semi-prepared foods (barbeque, schnitzel, sausage, caltaboș, pastrami, ham, slănină, jumări, salami, tobă, or cracklings), cheeses (caș, telemea, or urda), and desserts (gomboți, cozonac, crempita, crofne, doboș, scovergi, plăcintă or papanași) are just some of the traditional dishes that are consumed on holidays, at special events, but also on ordinary days.

The presence of Hungarian, Serbian, German, Croatian, and Turkish minorities, as well as other ethnic groups over time, has ensured the continuity of international cuisine in the city. There are bars, cafes, and restaurants, serving dishes such as ćevapčići, pljeskavica, goulash, Viennese schnitzel, bigos, sarma, chicken paprikash, karađorđeva šnicla, spätzle or fisherman's soup, desserts such as vargabéles, baklava, kadayif, palačinka, cremeschnitte, dobos torte, tiramisu, apple strudel, krofne or plum dumplings, and pastries such as pretzel, chebureki, pirozhki, halva, burek, kifli, pogača, kürtőskalács or lángos.

Due to the fast pace of urban life and easy access to a wide range of delivery and catering services, many Timișoara residents also show a notable preference for fast food. This trend is highlighted by the presence of restaurant chains and establishments offering quick dishes, from shawarma, kebab, burgers, fries, rice, or noodles to pizza, hot dog, grill, salads, sandwiches, or pastries and confectionery, consumed alongside juices, energy drinks, or soft drinks. The most important companies on the Timișoara food delivery market are Glovo, Wolt, Bolt Food, and Bringo.

Events such as Banat Brunch or Mic Dejun la Margina ("Breakfast at Margina"), which celebrate the culinary richness and traditions of Banat cuisine, are popular events in the local gastronomic landscape.

=== Museums ===
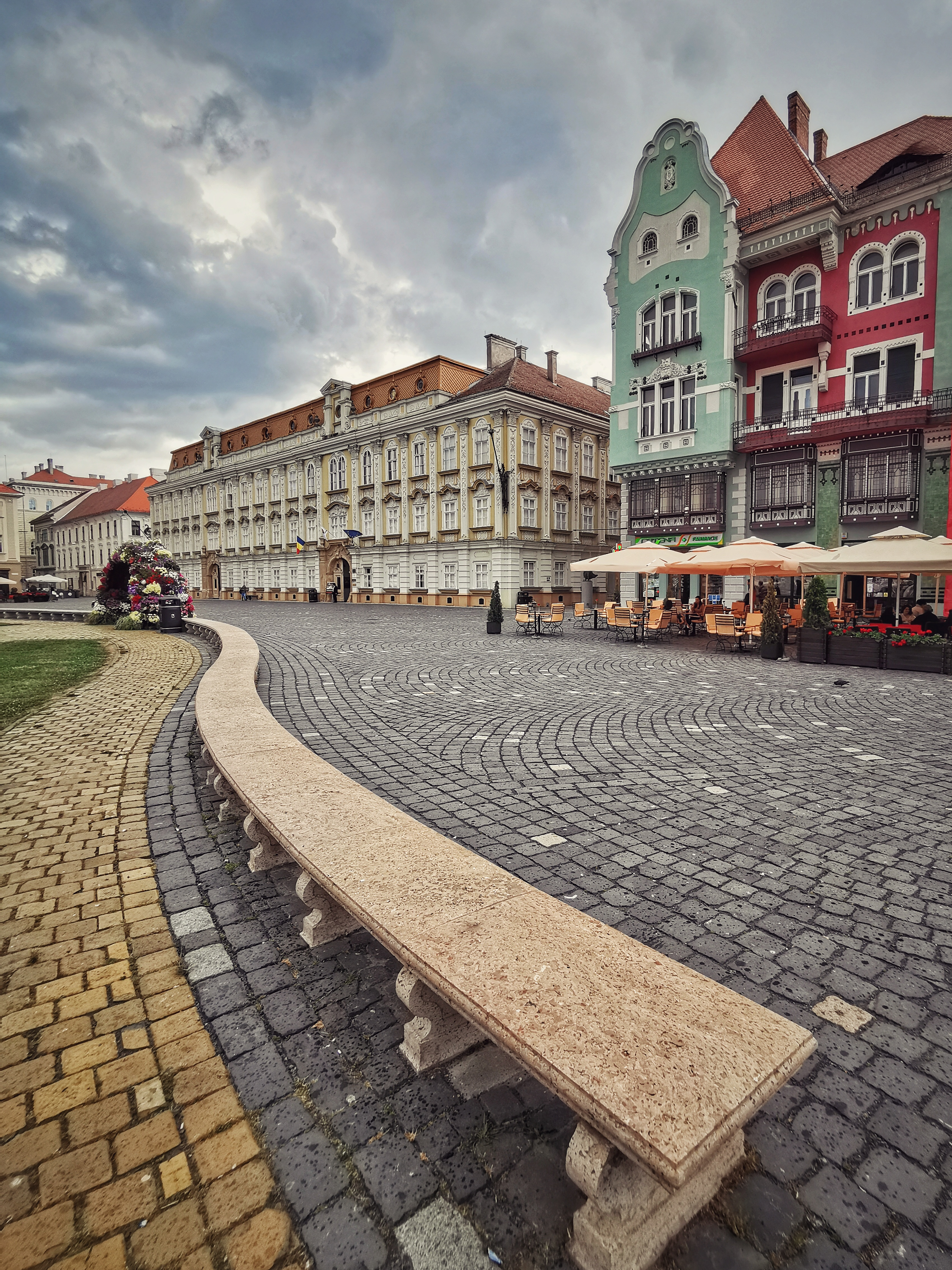
Timișoara National Museum of Art and the Brück House, shown together

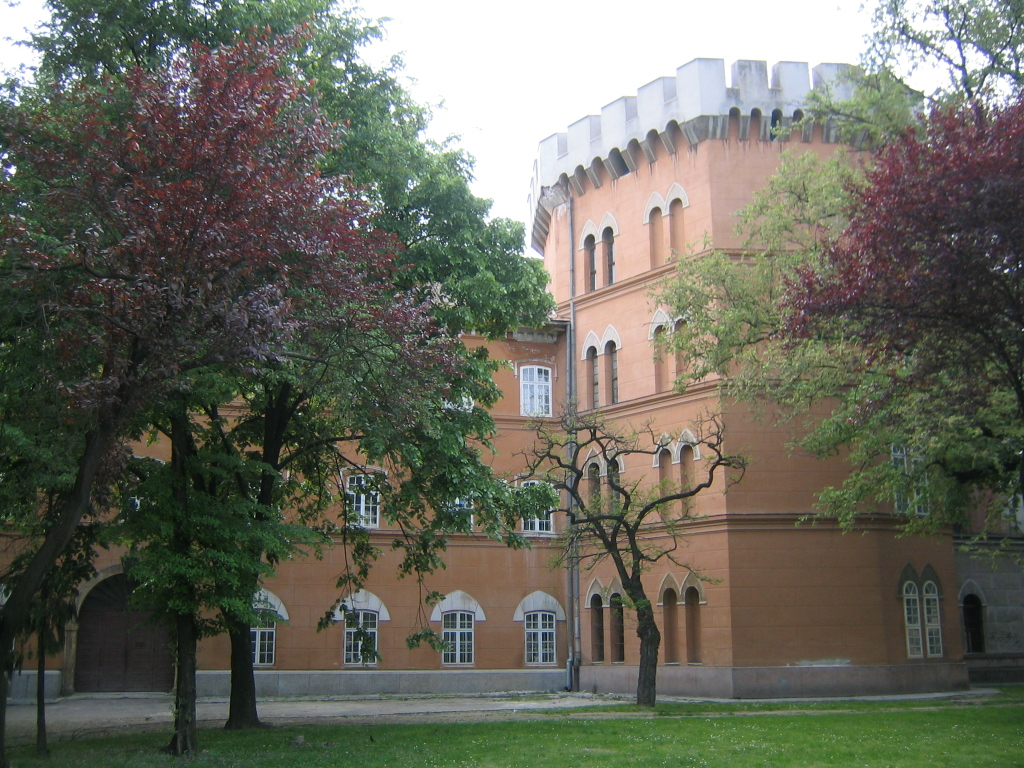
Huniade Castle, home of the National Museum of Banat

The Art Museum is housed in the Baroque Palace, a Late Baroque building in the Union Square. The exhibition space includes collections of contemporary, decorative and European art. Founded in 1877 and housed in the Huniade Castle, the National Museum of Banat has as fields of activity history and archeology. On the ground floor of the museum there is a reconstruction of the Parța Neolithic Sanctuary dating from the 6th millennium BC.

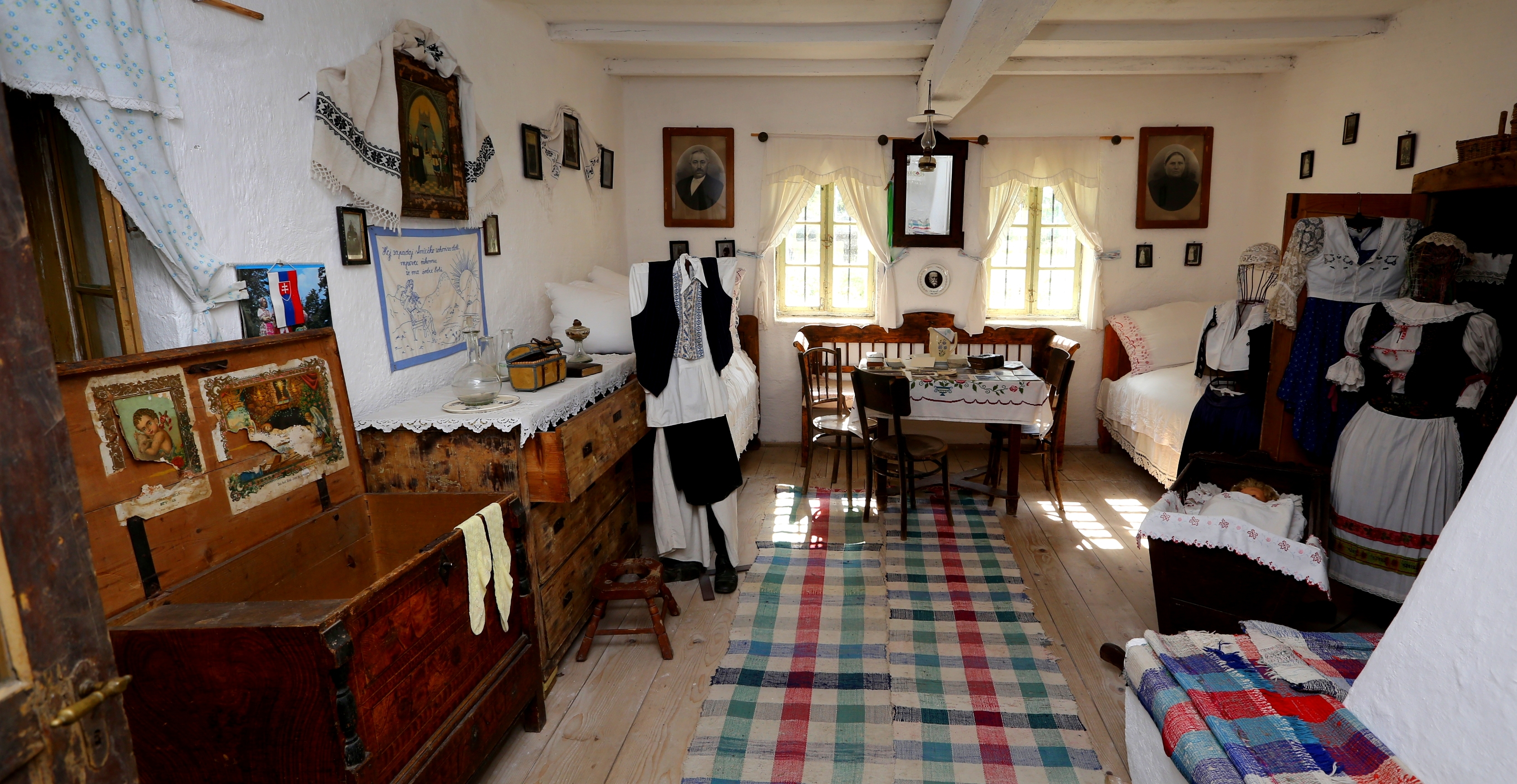
Folk costumes and interior fabrics on display at the Banat Village Museum

The Banat Village Museum is conceived as a traditional village from Banat, a living museum and open-air folk architecture reserve located in the Green Forest; it includes rustic households belonging to various ethnic groups in Banat, buildings with social function of the traditional village (town hall, school and church), technical installations and workshops. The Corneliu Miklosi Public Transport Museum is subordinated to the local public transport company. Various types of trams are on display, including the first horse-drawn tram and the first electric tram in the city, as well as buses, trolleybuses and vehicle maintenance equipment. There are plans to integrate the museum into a center for art, technology and experiment – MultipleXity. Founded in 1964, the Military Museum operates in the Military Casino in Liberty Square. The museum's patrimony consists of over 2,000 exhibits: maps, documents, models of historical monuments, photographs, weapons and military uniforms. In the museum collections owned by the Metropolis of Banat, the Serbian Orthodox Episcopate and the Roman Catholic Diocese there are objects of worship, icons on wood and glass from the 16th–19th centuries, books, manuscripts and old church objects. A future museum dedicated to the Romanian Revolution will be arranged in the building of the former Military Garrison. At present, there is a Memorial of the Revolution, in the collection of which there is written, audio and video information about the events of 1989.

In addition, there are several independent museums in Timișoara, including the Museum of the Communist Consumer, arranged as a typical house of the Golden Age, the museum dedicated to the Romanian cartoonist Popa's and the Kindlein Museum, a reenactment of Peter Kindlein's jewelry and clock shop and workshop.

=== Festivals ===
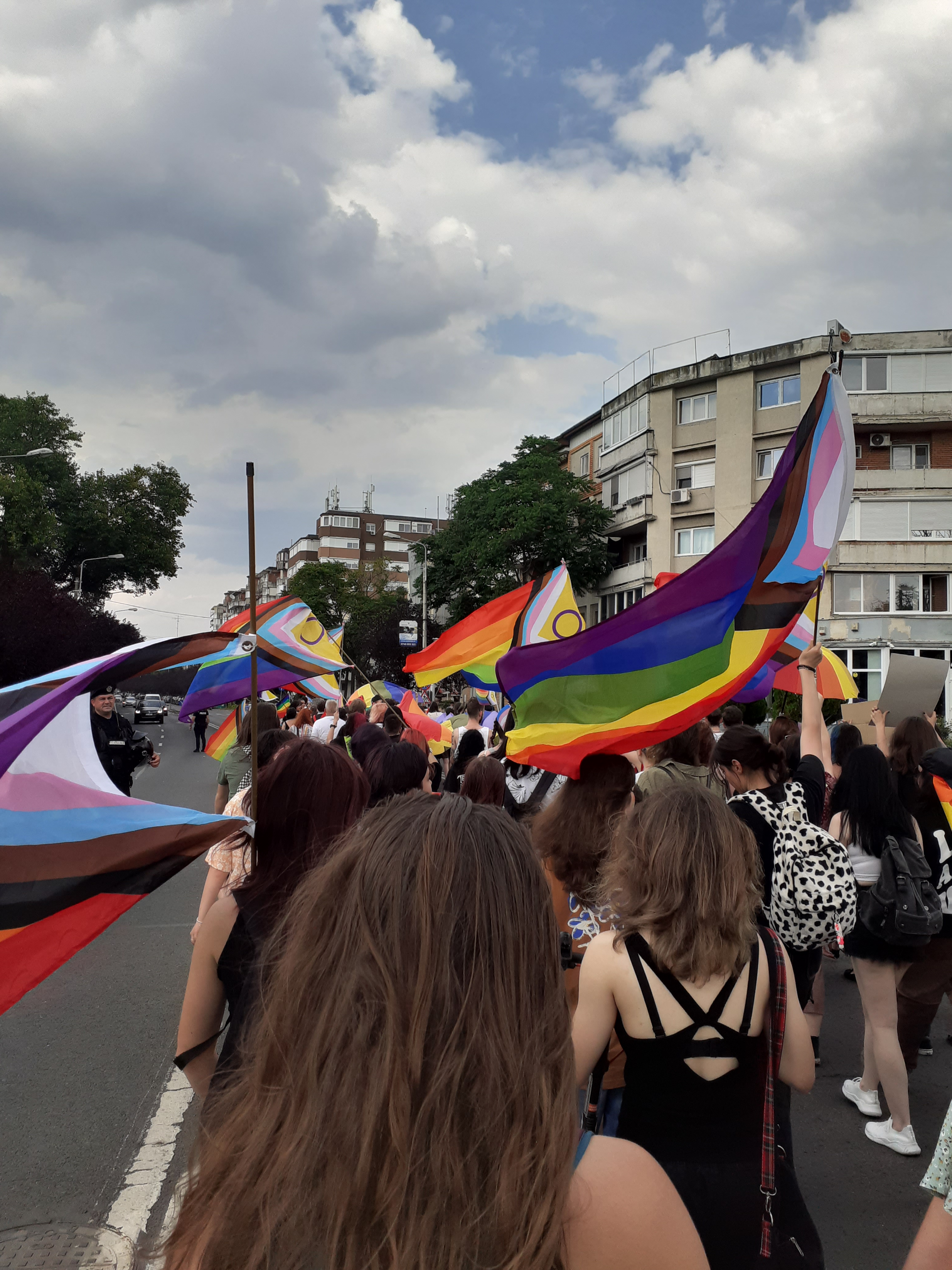
Demonstrators during Timișoara Pride Week in 2023

In 2013, around 400 cultural manifestations and events (shows, concerts, exhibitions, art and literature salons, festivals, etc.) were organized in Timișoara. Some of these include the music festivals Codru, DISKOteka (largest 1980s and 1990s music festival in Europe), Flight (largest music festival in western Romania), JAZZx, Plai and Vest Fest, the film festivals Ceau, Cinema!, European Film Festival and Festival du Film Français, the theater festivals Eurothalia, FEST-FDR and TESZT, LitVest (literature festival), the Medieval Festival, the Festival of Hearts (festival of world folklore) and Timișoara Pride Week. The latter was first organized in 2019; it has since become one of the best-attended public events among young people in Timișoara.

== Parks and green spaces ==
Timișoara is known as the "city of parks" for its parks and green spaces. These are mainly located around the old town, forming a green belt along the Bega Canal. At the end of 2009, the area of the city parks was 117.57 ha. In 2015, Timișoara had 16 m^{2} of green spaces per capita, under the EU recommendation of 26 m^{2}.

One of the most famous parks in Timișoara is the Anton Scudier Central Park, founded in 1850. Since 2009, the park has an Alley of Personalities with 24 bronze statues of local personalities. In 2019 the park was redesigned in the style of the Schönbrunn Gardens in Vienna. Also close to the city center is the Rose Park, which at the beginning of the 20th century earned Timișoara the nickname "city of roses". The park was inaugurated in 1891 on the occasion of an agro-industrial exhibition, and all the arrangements were made by landscape architect Wilhelm Mühle. The English- and French-style garden stretched over 9 ha and was visited by Emperor Franz Joseph I on 16 September 1891. The current park was arranged between 1928 and 1934, when it was the largest rosary in Southeast Europe, with 1,200 species and varieties of roses. In the park there is also the stage of the summer theater where several festivals, concerts and shows take place. Opposite the Rose Park is the Ion Creangă Children's Park. It was inaugurated in the same year as the Rose Park. The delimitation of the two parks was made later, when the area was crossed by the current Michelangelo Street. In 2012 it was redesigned as the largest children's playground in the city.

Queen Marie Park, formerly known as the People's Park, is the oldest park in Timișoara, established at the initiative of the governor of the Voivodeship of Serbia and Banat of Temeschwar, Count Johann von Coronini-Cronberg, in 1852. The Botanical Park, improperly called by the locals the Botanical Garden, is thought of as a dendrological park and was inaugurated in 1986, after a project by the architect Silvia Grumeza. The park contains collection species grouped in eight sectors, depending on the region of origin of the plant. One of the newest parks, the Civic Park was arranged over the former military barracks, demolished between 1956 and 1959. The main attraction of the park is the floral clock, built in 1971.

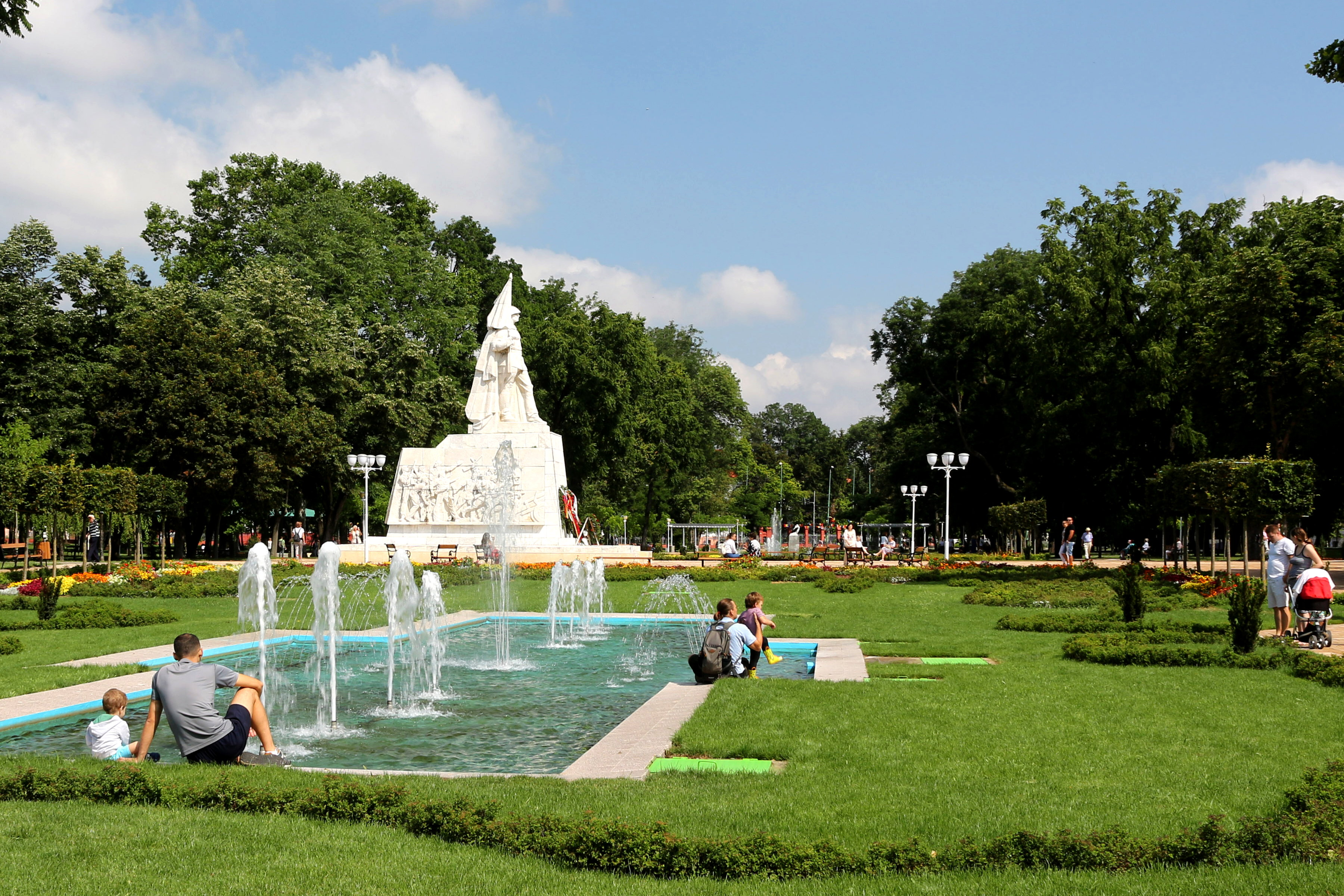
Monument to the Unknown Soldier in the Anton Scudier Central Park

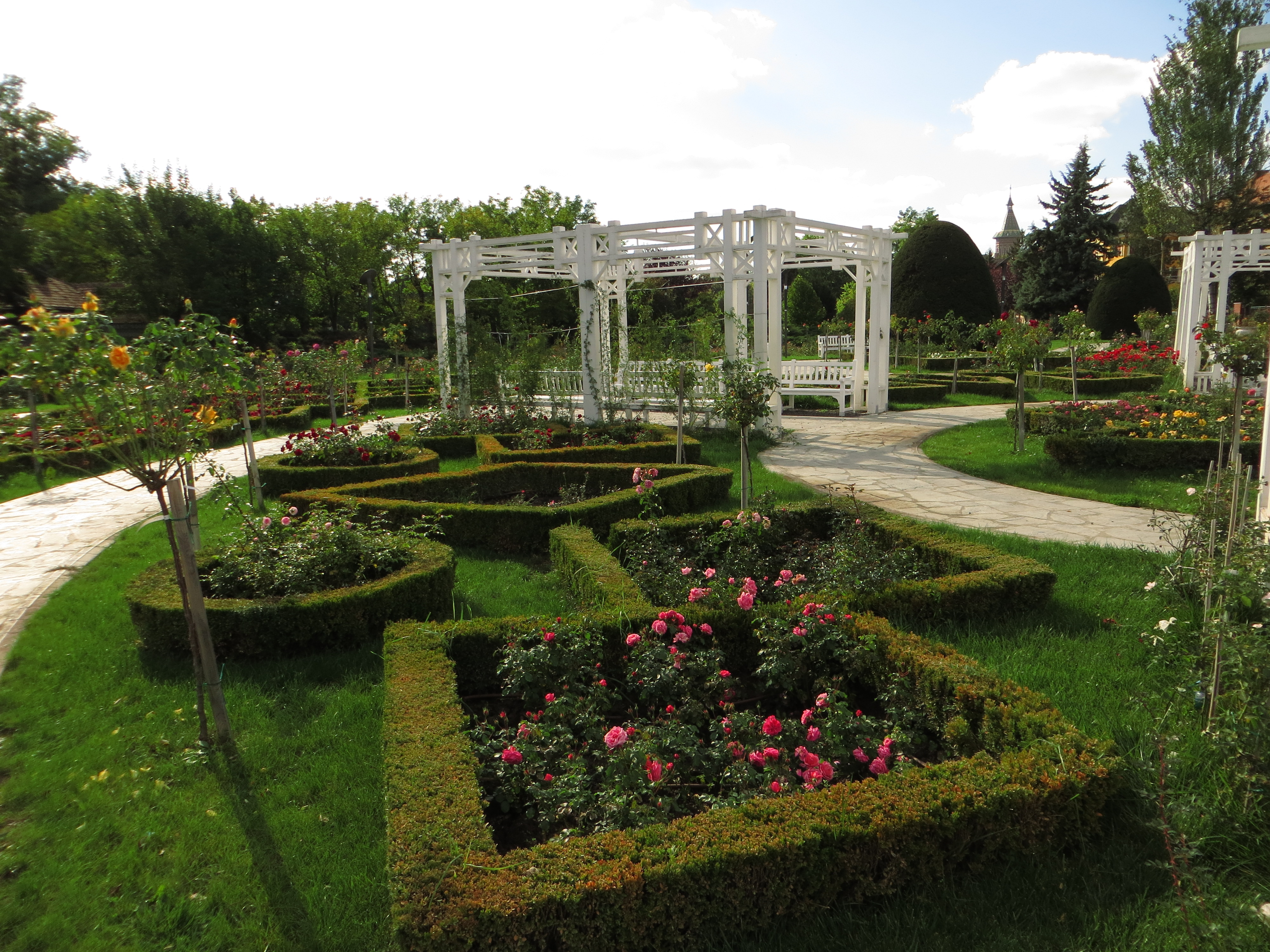
Roses Park

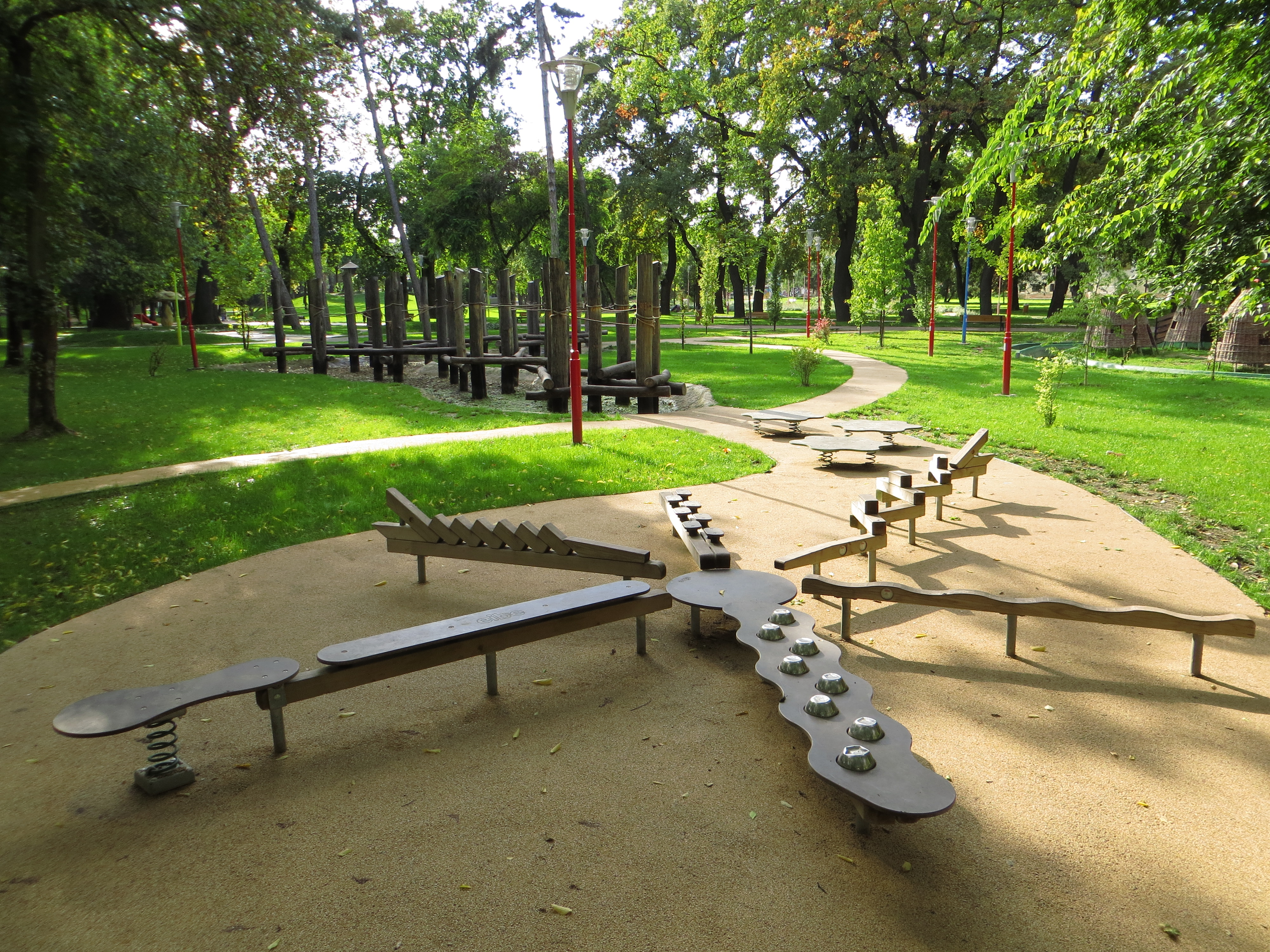
Ion Creangă Children's Park

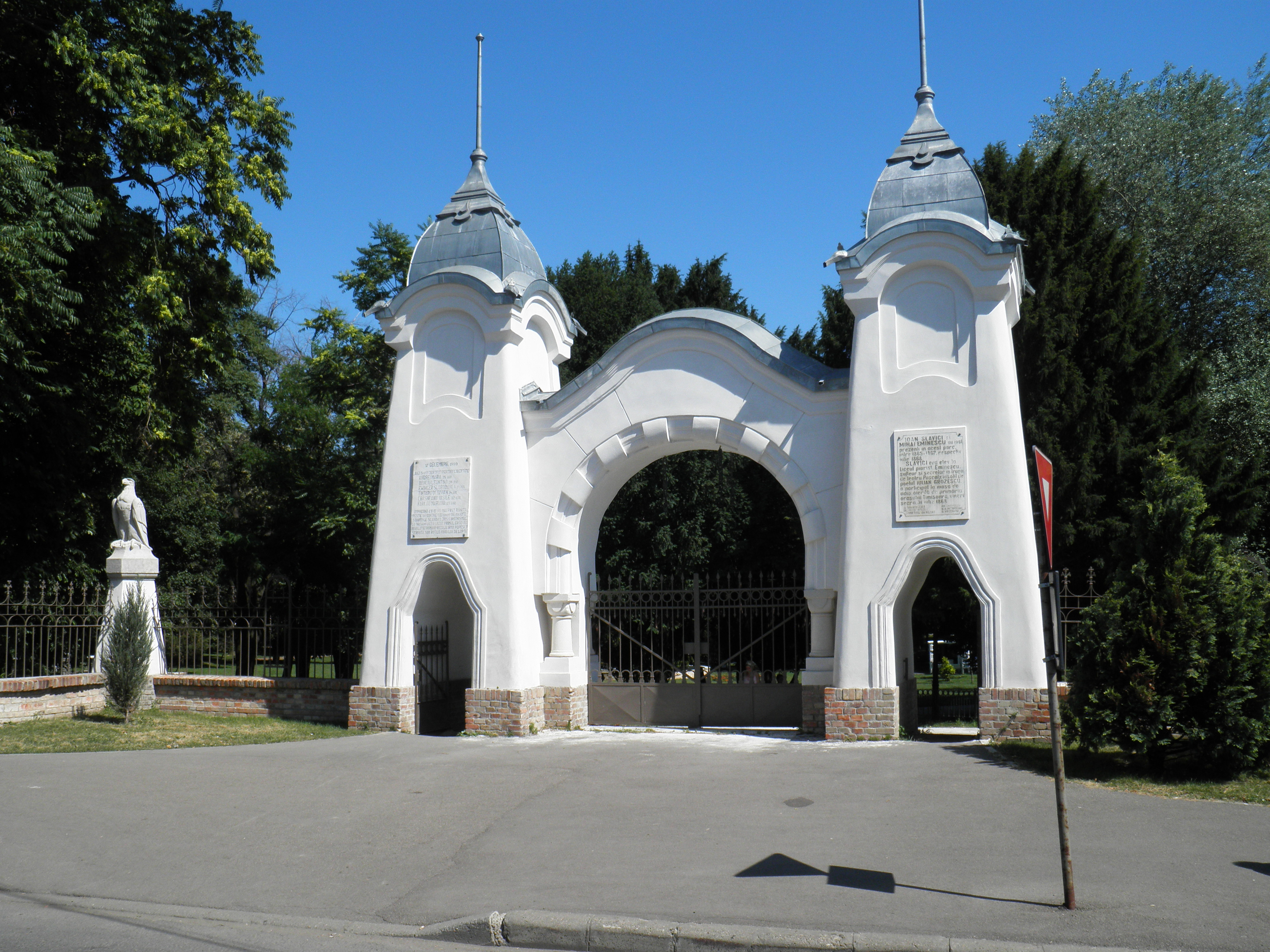
The Secession entrance gate to the Queen Marie Park

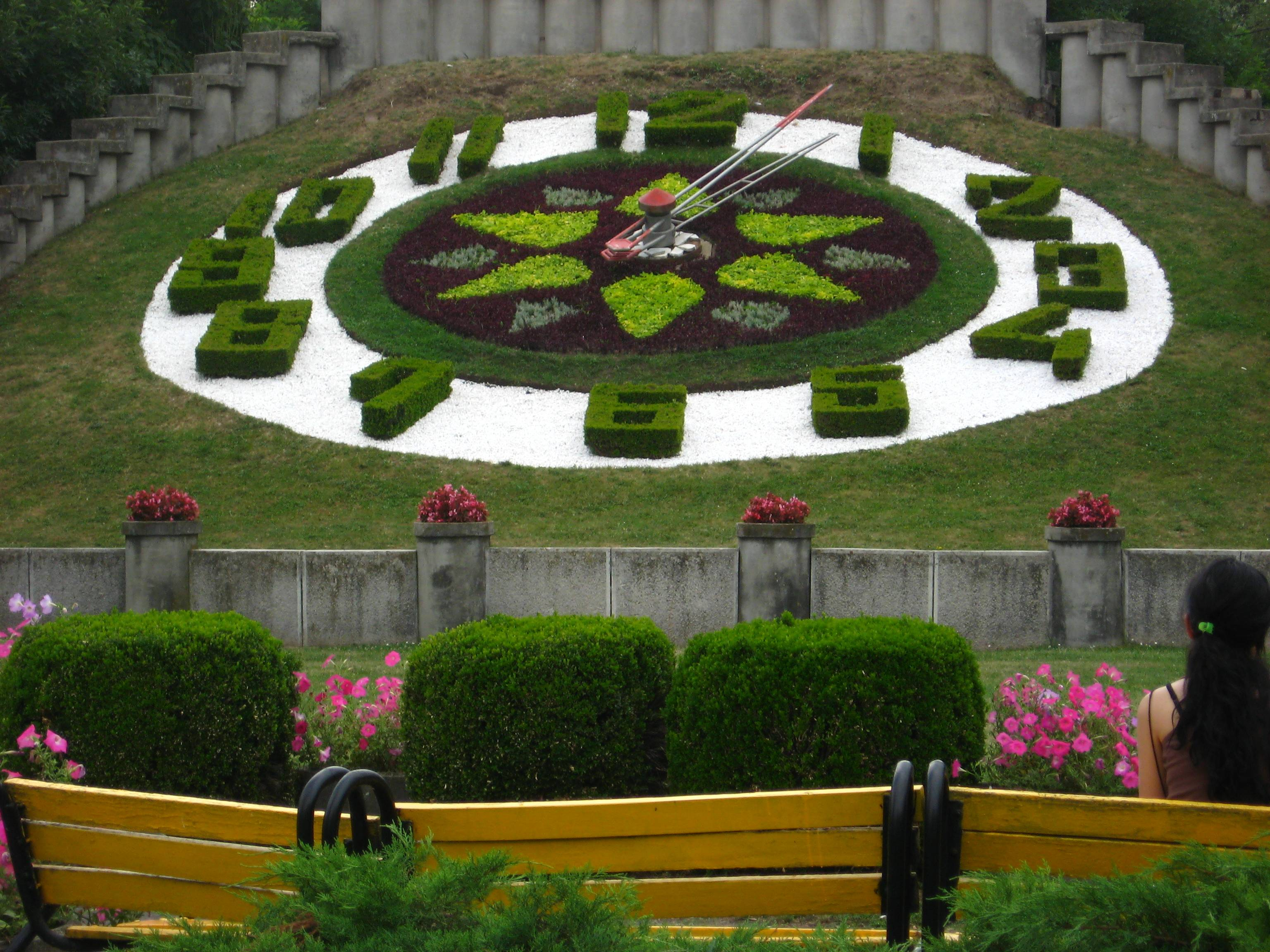
The floral clock in the Civic Park

== Sports ==
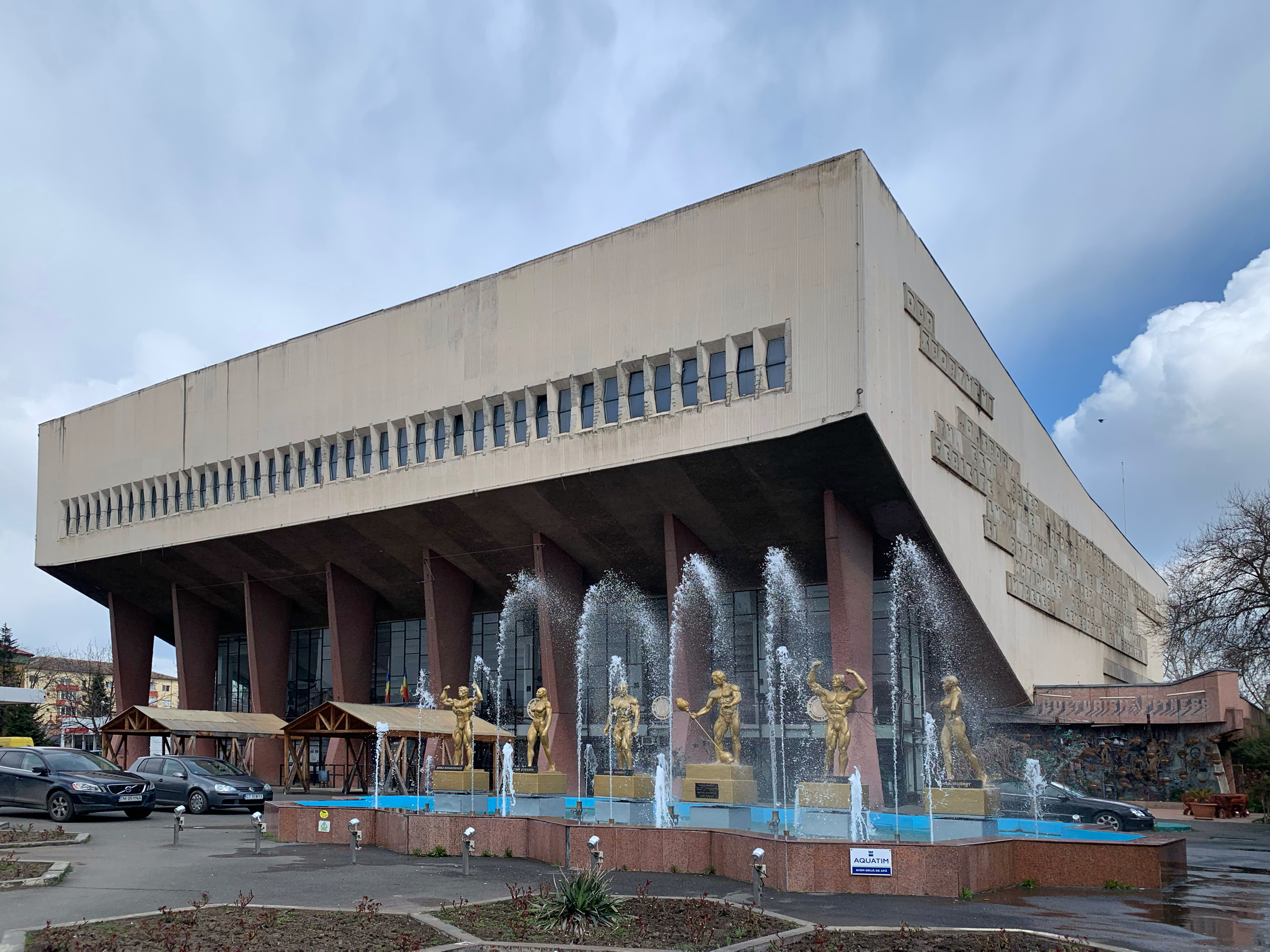
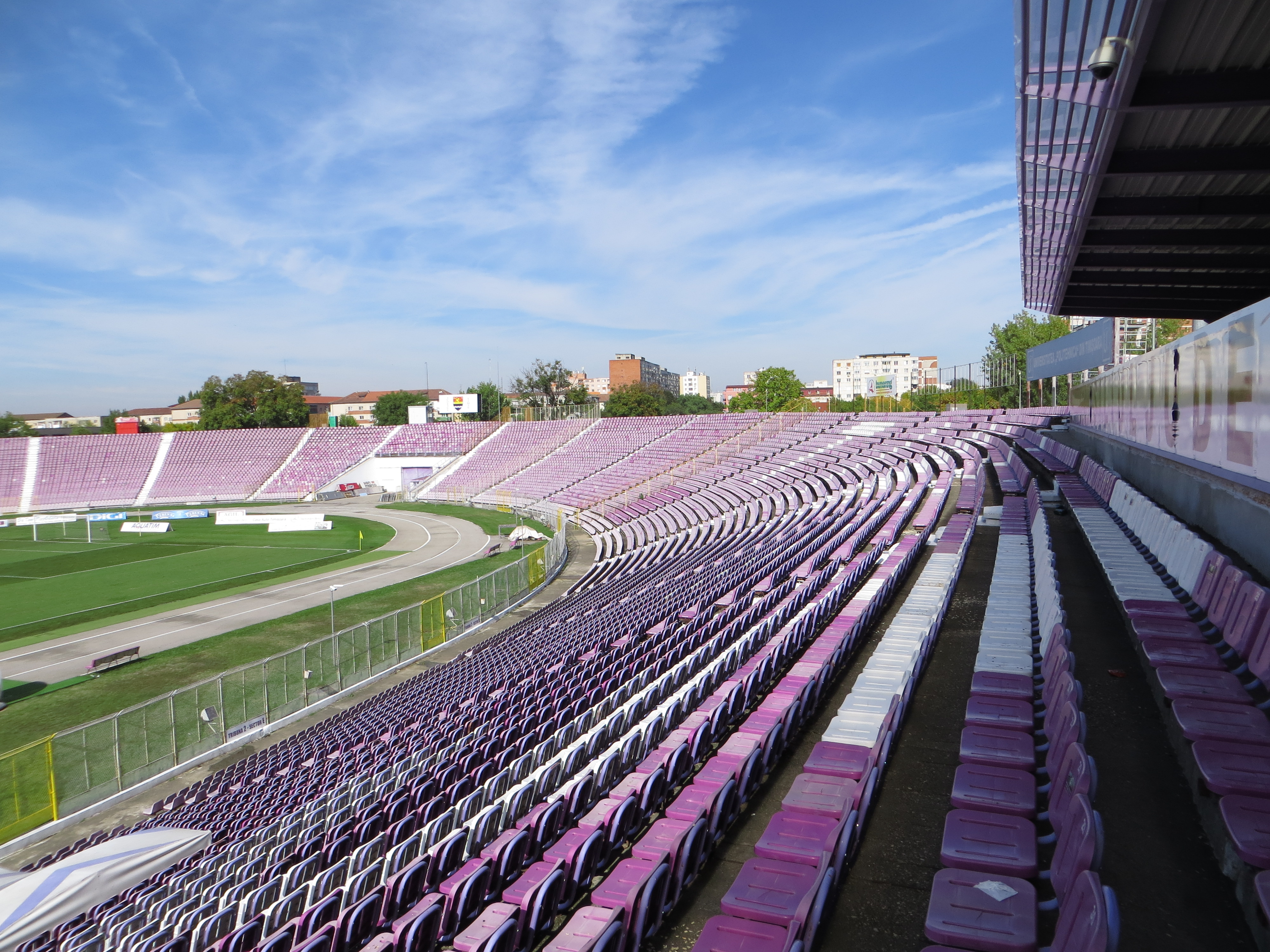
Constantin Jude Sports Hall (left) and Dan Păltinișanu Stadium (right) before its demolition

The amateur and performance sports activity has an old tradition in Timișoara through sports associations and clubs. The first football game in Timișoara took place on 25 June 1899. Three years later, CA Timișoara – the first football club in Romania – was founded. Traditional teams have been active between the two world wars. Ripensia Timișoara, founded in 1928 and dissolved in 1948, was the first Romanian club to turn professional. In its short history, the club has won four national titles and two national cups. Ripensia Timișoara was re-established in 2012 and currently plays in Liga IV. Chinezul Timișoara (Hungarian: Temesvári Kinizsi), active between 1910 and 1946, was one of the most successful teams in the history of Romanian football, winning between 1921 and 1927 six consecutive titles of champion of Romania. There are four football clubs: ACS Poli Timișoara, ASU Politehnica Timișoara, CFR Timișoara and Ripensia Timișoara. SCM Timișoara, a multi-sport club, was founded in 1982 and includes sections for basketball (BC Timișoara), handball (SCM Politehnica Timișoara), rugby (Saracens Timișoara), motorcycling and tennis.

With a capacity of over 32,000 seats, Dan Păltinișanu Stadium, home stadium of ACS Poli Timișoara, is the second largest stadium in Romania, after Arena Națională in Bucharest. The current stadium will be demolished in 2021; a multifunctional sports complex with a 32,150-seat arena and a 16,000-seat multipurpose hall will be built in its place. Together with the existing adjacent sports facilities and amenities, the two arenas will form one of the largest sports complexes in Eastern Europe.

There are six other smaller stadiums: Heroes of Timișoara Arena (UEFA Elite stadium); CFR's CFR Stadium near Timișoara North railway station; ASU Politehnica's Știința Stadium on the campus of the Polytechnic University; Gheorghe Rășcanu Stadium on the Ronaț district; Ciarda Roșie Stadium (former Tehnomet); and Ripensia's Electrica Stadium (the former UMT Stadium), near the Green Forest.

There are many sports centers in the city as well. Most of these facilities are sports halls and swimming pools, many of them built by the municipality in the past several years. The main indoor venue is Constantin Jude Sports Hall, formerly known as Olimpia Hall. Used as a local base for men's and women's basketball, volleyball, handball and futsal teams in the city, the hall hosted matches of EuroBasket Women 2015.

== Mass media ==
=== Print media ===
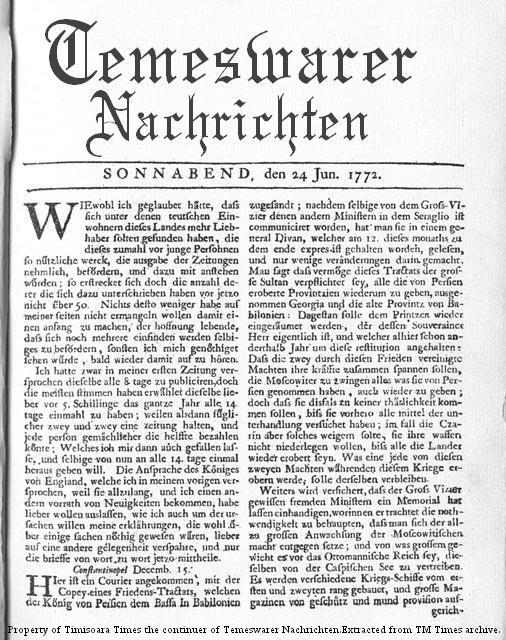
24 June 1772 edition of Temeswarer Nachrichten (Timișoara Times), the first newspaper printed in Timișoara

The first newspaper printed in Timișoara in 1771, edited by typographer Matthias Joseph Heimerl, was called Temeswarer Nachrichten and appeared in 13 editions. Between 1830 and 1849, Temeswarer Wochenblatt appeared, whose editor was Joseph Klapka, the founder of the first circulating library in the Habsburg monarchy (1815) and mayor of Timișoara between 1819 and 1833. Between 1872 and 1918 the Hungarian-language newspapers Délmagyarország and Temesvári hirlap appeared. The Serbian minority first appeared on the local media market in 1829 with the Banatski almanah (Serbian Cyrillic: Банатски алманах). The first Romanian-language newspapers published in Banat were printed in Vienna and then in Pest, as happened with Luminatorul led by Vincențiu Babeș. During the mid-19th century, there was a branch of the state printing house in Vienna, and in 1878 Prince Alexander Karađorđević, fleeing from Serbia, opened a printing house in Iosefin, which he used exclusively for political purposes. The printing activity was boosted at the end of the century, when the manual printing machines, driven by a distribution wheel, were replaced by those driven by electricity, after the establishment of the power plant. The first machine of this kind in Timișoara was a Druckmaschine belonging to the episcopal printing house in the Diocese of Cenad, which was inaugurated in 1891. The outbreak of World War I led to a stagnation of printing activity, but, after the city was taken over by the Romanian authorities, it was revived; in 1920 no less than nine printing houses were known in Timișoara.

The interwar years were marked by numerous political, humorous, medical, cultural, economic, religious, agricultural, commercial or almanac weeklies. Also in the interwar period, numerous bilingual or even trilingual publications appeared. The first publication in Romanian, German and Hungarian was the monthly Apicultorul – Bienenzüchter – Méhész. In addition to the publications in the languages spoken in Timișoara, between 1930 and 1936 the Esperanto quarterly Urmiginta Statoj de Europe appeared, edited by Josef Zauner, and in 1932 the publication Tel-Chaj (טל צ׳ג) was registered, a Jewish bimonthly in Hungarian, but no number appeared. From a catalog prepared by Florian Moldovan and Alexander Krischan, in the documentary fund of the County Library of Timișoara were registered in the early 1970s no less than 143 newspaper and magazine titles, of which 60 were Romanian, 39 Hungarian and 40 German.

After 1945, but especially since 1948, the number of newspapers and magazines was reduced to a few, all published or under the political control of the Communist Party. There were the following papers in Timișoara between 1970 and 1977: Drapelul roșu, Neue Banater Zeitung (German language), Szabad szó (Hungarian language), Banatske novine (magazine, Serbian language) and the literary revue Orizont, all of them with an important circulation. Even if the years of 1965–1971 are better known as providing a relative political freedom, press in Romania went away with the PCR control. Media was obliged both to put in light the socialist reality in Romania and to combat the ideological bourgeois influences and retrograde mentality. The cultural revues had to promote the "involved" militant socialist arts and literature and criticize the tendencies to separate the artistic creation from the socialist realities; it was the way the Romanian press became an instrument of the PCR.

Apart from the publications previously censored under communist rule, which quickly changed their orientation under new names, in the first months after the Romanian Revolution, the number of newspaper and magazine titles on the local press market increased dramatically.

Currently, in Timișoara appear:

- dailies: in Romanian: Renașterea bănățeană (successor of Drapelul roșu), Timiș Expres and Ziua de Vest; in Hungarian: Nyugati jelen;
- one biweekly: Timpolis;
- one triweekly: Timișoara;
- weeklies: in Romanian: Opinia Timișoarei and Bănățeanul; in German: Banater Zeitung (weekly supplement of Allgemeine Deutsche Zeitung für Rumänien); in Hungarian: Heti új szó; in Serbian: Naša reč;
- monthly: in Romanian: Orizont, Monitorul Primăriei municipiului Timișoara and Agenda Consiliului Județean Timiș; in Hungarian: Irodalmi jelen; in Italian: Azienda Italia;
- quarterly: in Romanian: Orient latin and Anotimpuri literare; in Serbian: Književni život;
- annuals: in Romanian: Almanahul Agenda; in Hungarian: Mindenki kalendáriuma; in German: Die Stafette;
- sporadic periodicity: Helion magazine of the homonymous science fiction club.

In recent years, more and more publications have given up the printed version, continuing their activity only in the online version.

=== Audiovisual media ===
==== Radio stations ====
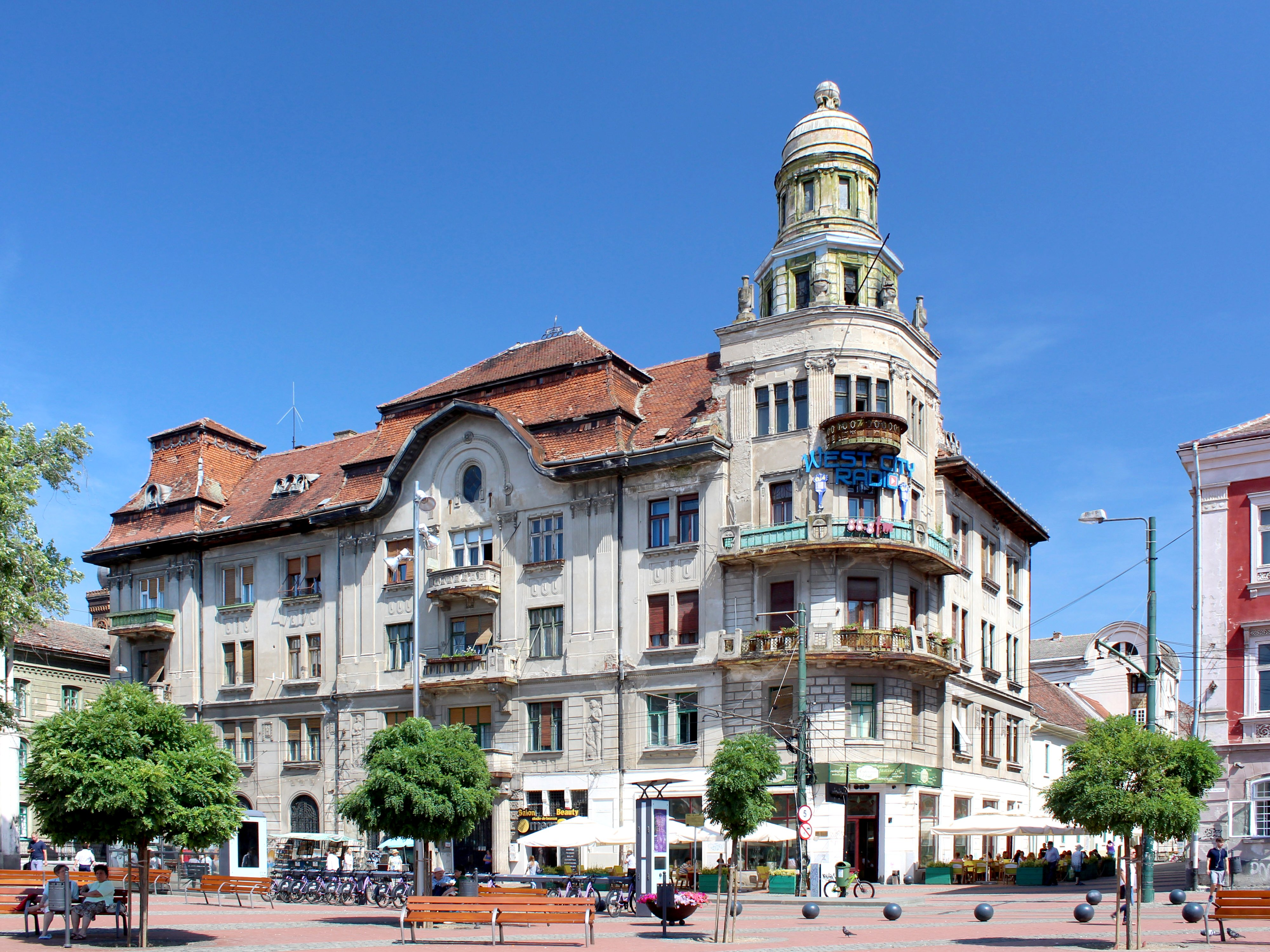
Credit Bank Palace, nowadays home of West City Radio

Radio Timișoara, a public station, is part of Radio România Regional, the network of local and regional public radios of the Romanian Radio Broadcasting Company. The idea of building a radio station in Timișoara was advanced for the first time in July 1930. The first broadcast of Radio Timișoara dates from 5 May 1955, with Andrei Dângă and Emilia Culea as broadcasters. Today, Radio Timișoara broadcasts in 10 languages on four frequencies that cover a large part of the counties in western Romania. West City Radio has been broadcasting since 1995, when it received the first broadcasting license in western Romania. The station is addressed to an audience aged between 24 and 48 years. Another local private radio station is Radio Europa Nova, founded in July 1995. Its broadcasting area covers 20–30 km (12–19 mi) around the city.

In recent years, numerous local stations of some national stations have appeared, such as Digi FM, Europa FM, Virgin Radio, Radio Impuls, Radio ZU, RFI România, Pro FM, Kiss FM, Radio Guerrilla, etc.

==== Television stations ====
TVR Timișoara is one of the four territorial studios of the Romanian Television Society. It broadcasts since 17 October 1994 and covers the western part of Romania (Timiș, Arad, Caraș-Severin and Hunedoara counties), as well as the Romanian communities in Vojvodina (Serbia) and southeastern Hungary. TVR Timișoara is a member of CIRCOM Regional and has collaborated over the years with regional public televisions in Novi Sad (Serbia), Szeged (Hungary) and Uzhhorod (Ukraine). Teleuniversitatea (Teleuniversity) has the status of a department within the Polytechnic University, obtaining a broadcasting license in 1994. Teleuniversitatea is a television station with educational objectives, which operates on a non-profit basis, without a budget allocation. TV Europa Nova is the only local private television station. It first aired on 1 May 1994.

== Notable people ==
=== Honorary citizens ===
Among the recipients of the honorary citizenship of Timișoara are:

Date	Name	Notes
14 November 1995	Corneliu Coposu	Politician, political prisoner
23 January 1996	Corina Peptan	Chess player
24 September 1996	Ioan Holender	Operatic baritone, director of the Vienna State Opera
30 June 1998	Iolanda Balaș	Olympic high jumper
22 February 2000	Ana Blandiana	Poet, novelist, publicist, essayist
27 February 2001	Wolfgang Clement	Minister-President of North Rhine-Westphalia
29 January 2002	Cosmin Contra	Football player and manager
11 November 2003	Simona Amânar	Olympic gymnast
18 May 2004	Johnny Weissmuller	Olympic swimmer, actor
30 January 2007	Paul Goma	Novelist, essayist, memoirist, anti-communist dissident
24 April 2007	Mihai Șora	Philosopher, essayist
31 July 2007	Mugur Isărescu	Governor of BNR, prime minister of Romania
23 April 2013	Francesco Illy	Founder of illy, inventor of espresso machine
22 October 2013	Chester Williams	Rugby player
23 January 2015	Stefan Hell	Physicist, Nobel Prize laureate
20 March 2015	Peter Freund	Physicist
10 May 2016	Dumitru Prunariu	Cosmonaut
27 November 2019	Ion Ivanovici	Clarinettist, conductor, composer

== International relations ==
Timișoara hosts two general consulates, representing Germany and Serbia. The German consulate is situated in the Flavia Palace on Splaiul Tudor Vladimirescu, whereas the Serbian consulate is located at 4 Remus Street.

== Twin towns – sister cities ==
Timișoara is twinned with:

- Graz, Austria (1982)
- Sassari, Italy (1990)
- Mulhouse, France (1991)
- Faenza, Italy (1991)
- Karlsruhe, Germany (1992)
- Rueil-Malmaison, France (1993)
- Szeged, Hungary (1998)
- Gera, Germany (1998)
- Treviso, Italy (2003)
- Novi Sad, Serbia (2005)
- Palermo, Italy (2005)
- Shenzhen, China (2007)
- Nottingham, United Kingdom (2008)
- Chernivtsi, Ukraine (2010)
- Trujillo, Peru (2010)
- Da Nang, Vietnam (2014)
- Bolzano, Italy (2015)
- Lublin, Poland (2016)
- Porto, Portugal (2018)
- Cancún, Mexico (2019)
