= List of religious buildings in Timișoara =

This is a list of religious buildings in the western Romanian city of Timișoara. The majority are Romanian Orthodox churches—40 in total—organized into 27 parishes. There are also 13 Roman Catholic churches, five Greek Catholic churches, three Serbian Orthodox churches, three Reformed churches, one Lutheran church, and one Ukrainian Orthodox church, as well as three synagogues (two of them functional), most of which were built during the Austro-Hungarian period.

| English name | Romanian name | District | Denomination | Coordinates, address | Image |
|---|---|---|---|---|---|
| Church of the Ascension of the Lord | Biserica Înălțarea Domnului | Mehala | Romanian Orthodox | 45°45′53″N 21°12′22″E; 15 Avram Iancu Square | |
| Church of the Dormition of the Mother of God | Biserica Adormirea Maicii Domnului | Aradului | Romanian Orthodox | 45°46′21″N 21°13′11″E; 1A Dej Street | |
| Church of the Dormition of the Mother of God | Biserica Adormirea Maicii Domnului | Elisabetin | Romanian Orthodox | 45°44′30″N 21°13′47″E; 5 Church Square | |
| Church of the Dormition of the Mother of God | Biserica Adormirea Maicii Domnului | Ghiroda Nouă | Romanian Orthodox | 42–44 Flacăra Street | |
| Church of the Nativity of the Mother of God | Biserica Nașterea Maicii Domnului | Iosefin | Romanian Orthodox | 45°44′46″N 21°12′59″E; 9 Alexandru Mocioni Square | |
| Church of the Nativity of the Mother of God | Biserica Nașterea Maicii Domnului | Steaua | Romanian Orthodox | | |
| Church of the Pentecost | Biserica Pogorârea Sfântului Duh | Dacia | Romanian Orthodox | | |
| Holy Apostles Peter and Paul Church | Biserica Sfinții Apostoli Petru și Pavel | Fratelia | Romanian Orthodox | | |
| Holy Apostles Peter and Paul Church | Biserica Sfinții Apostoli Petru și Pavel | Lipovei | Romanian Orthodox | | |
| Holy Emperors Constantine and Helena Church | Biserica Sfinții Împărați Constantin și Elena | Modern | Romanian Orthodox | | |
| Holy Hierarch Nicholas Church | Biserica Sfântul Ierarh Nicolae | Braytim–Timișoara Sud | Romanian Orthodox | | |
| Holy Hierarch Nicholas Church | Biserica Sfântul Ierarh Nicolae | Soarelui | Romanian Orthodox | | |
| Martyrs' Church | Biserica Martirilor | Girocului | Romanian Orthodox | | |
| Militaries' Church | Biserica Militarilor | Cetate | Romanian Orthodox | | |
| Saint Elijah Church | Biserica Sfântul Ilie | Fabric | Romanian Orthodox | | |
| Saint Paraskeva Church | Biserica Sfânta Parascheva | Tipografilor | Romanian Orthodox | | |
| Students' Church | Biserica Studenților | Complexul Studențesc | Romanian Orthodox | | |
| Three Holy Hierarchs Metropolitan Cathedral | Catedrala Mitropolitană Sfinții Trei Ierarhi | Cetate | Romanian Orthodox | | |
| Saint George Serbian Church | Biserica Sârbă Sfântul Gheorghe | Fabric | Serbian Orthodox | | |
| Saint Nicholas Serbian Church | Biserica Sârbă Sfântul Nicolae | Mehala | Serbian Orthodox | | |
| Serbian Cathedral of the Ascension of the Lord | Catedrala Sârbă Înălțarea Domnului | Cetate | Serbian Orthodox | | |
| Annunciation Church | Biserica Buna Vestire | Lipovei | Greek Catholic | | |
| Church of the Nativity of the Mother of God | Biserica Nașterea Maicii Domnului | Fabric | Greek Catholic | | |
| Church of Saint Mary Queen of Peace and Unity | Biserica Sfânta Maria Regina Păcii și a Unității | Elisabetin | Greek Catholic | | |
| Holy Apostles Peter and Paul Church | Biserica Sfinții Apostoli Petru și Pavel | Mehala | Greek Catholic | | |
| Misericordia Church | Biserica Mizericordienilor | Cetate | Greek Catholic | | |
| Church of the Dormition of the Mother of God | Biserica Adormirea Maicii Domnului | Fratelia | Roman Catholic | | |
| Church of the Holy Name of Blessed Virgin Mary | Biserica Sfântul Nume al Sfintei Fecioare Maria | Mehala | Roman Catholic | | |
| Church of the Nativity of Virgin Mary | Biserica Nașterea Fecioarei Maria | Iosefin | Roman Catholic | | |
| Church of the Sacred Heart of Jesus | Biserica Preasfânta Inimă a lui Isus | Elisabetin | Roman Catholic | | |
| Holy Trinity Church | Biserica Sfânta Treime | Ronaț | Roman Catholic | | |
| Millennium Church | Biserica Millennium | Fabric | Roman Catholic | | |
| Notre Dame Church | Biserica Notre Dame | Iosefin | Roman Catholic | | |
| Piarist Church | Biserica Piaristă | Cetate | Roman Catholic | | |
| Saint Catherine Church | Biserica Sfânta Ecaterina | Cetate | Roman Catholic | | |
| Saint George Cathedral | Catedrala Sfântul Gheorghe | Cetate | Roman Catholic | | |
| Saint Joseph Church | Biserica Sfântul Iosif | Fratelia | Roman Catholic | | |
| Saint Roch Church | Biserica Sfântul Rochus | Freidorf | Roman Catholic | | |
| Salvatorian Monastery | Mănăstirea Salvatoriană | Elisabetin | Roman Catholic | | |
| Elisabetin Reformed Church | Biserica Reformată din Elisabetin | Elisabetin | Reformed | | |
| Fratelia Reformed Church | Biserica Reformată din Fratelia | Fratelia | Reformed | | |
| New Millennium Reformed Church | Biserica Reformată Noul Mileniu | Fabric | Reformed | | |
| Lutheran Church | Biserica Luterană | Cetate | Lutheran | | |
| Ukrainian Church | Biserica Ucraineană | Șagului | Ukrainian Orthodox | | |
| Betania Church | Biserica Betania | Elisabetin | Adventist | | |
| Betania Church | Biserica Betania | Dâmbovița | Baptist | | |
| Betel Church | Biserica Betel | Iosefin | Baptist | | |
| Eclesia Church | Biserica Eclesia | Șagului | Baptist | | |
| Emanuel Church | Biserica Emanuel | Blașcovici | Baptist | | |
| Ghetsimani Church | Biserica Ghetsimani | Girocului | Baptist | | |
| Maranata Church | Biserica Maranata | Soarelui | Baptist | | |
| Vox Domini Church | Biserica Vox Domini | Girocului | Baptist | | |
| Agape Church | Biserica Agape | Aradului | Brethren | | |
| Aletheia Church | Biserica Aletheia | Olimpia–Stadion | Brethren | | |
| Metanoia Church | Biserica Metanoia | Torontalului | Brethren | | |
| Carmel Church | Biserica Carmel | Ronaț | Pentecostal | | |
| Elim Church | Biserica Elim | Elisabetin | Pentecostal | | |
| Living Waters Church | Biserica Apele Vii | Elisabetin | Pentecostal | | |
| Cetate Synagogue | Sinagoga din Cetate | Cetate | Jewish | | |
| Fabric Synagogue | Sinagoga din Fabric | Fabric | Jewish | | |
| Iosefin Synagogue | Sinagoga din Iosefin | Iosefin | Jewish | | |
| Central Mosque | Moscheea Centrală | Girocului | Islam | | |
