= List of parks in Timișoara =

Parks and green spaces in Timișoara, Romania

The list of parks in Timișoara provides an overview of parks and green spaces in the western Romanian city of Timișoara, including their Romanian names, their districts, their geocoordinates, and their foundation years.

As of 2010, the area of the existing parks in Timișoara is 117.57 ha. The park with the largest area is Lidia Park (the former city nursery) – 9.03 ha, followed by the Botanical Park – 8.41 ha.

English name	Romanian name	District	Coordinates	Year founded	Area (ha)	Image
Parks north of the Bega
Andrei Mocioni Park (former name: ILSA Park)	Parcul Andrei Mocioni	Bastion	45°45′26″N 21°14′28″E	1950s	2.18	
Anton Scudier Central Park	Parcul Central „Anton Scudier”	Cetate	45°45′5″N 21°13′13″E	1879	7.91	
Botanical Park	Parcul Botanic	Cetate	45°45′36″N 21°13′29″E	1966	8.41	
Brothers Constantin Park	Parcul Frații Constantin	Crișan	45°45′34″N 21°15′53″E			
Bucovina Park	Parcul Bucovina	Bucovina	45°46′10″N 21°13′0″E			
Cathedral Park	Parcul Catedralei	Cetate	45°45′0″N 21°13′24″E	1946	4.54	
Civic Park	Parcul Civic	Cetate	45°45′14″N 21°13′53″E	1971	7.6	
Constantin Diaconovici Loga Park	Parcul Constantin Diaconovici Loga	Cetate	45°45′14″N 21°14′2″E			
Dacia Park	Parcul Dacia	Dacia	45°45′53″N 21°13′2″E	1970s		
Hunyadi Park	Parcul Huniade	Cetate	45°45′10″N 21°13′37″E	1850s		
Ion C. Brătianu Park	Parcul Ion C. Brătianu	Cetate	45°45′9″N 21°13′51″E			
Ion Creangă Children's Park	Parcul Copiilor „Ion Creangă”	Bastion	45°45′9″N 21°14′12″E	1891	6.64	
Iulius Gardens		Antene	45°45′54″N 21°13′43″E	2019		
Justice Park	Parcul Justiției	Cetate	45°44′58″N 21°13′37″E		3.27	
Roses Park	Parcul Rozelor	Cetate	45°44′59″N 21°13′52″E	1891	3.75	
Waterworks Park	Parcul Uzinei	Crișan	45°45′33″N 21°15′42″E			
Parks south of the Bega
Adolescence Park	Parcul Adolescenței	Girocului	45°44′0″N 21°14′4″E			
Alpinet Park	Parcul Alpinet	Elisabetin	45°44′55″N 21°13′22″E	1926	2.07	
Carmen Sylva Park (former name: Doina Park)	Parcul Carmen Sylva	Elisabetin	45°44′38″N 21°13′23″E	1895	2.04	
Church Square Park	Parcul Piața Bisericii	Elisabetin	45°44′33″N 21°13′46″E			
Clăbucet Park	Parcul Clăbucet	Dâmbovița	45°44′12″N 21°12′21″E			
Cross Square Park	Parcul Piața Crucii	Elisabetin	45°44′31″N 21°13′53″E			
Gheorghe Doja Park	Parcul Gheorghe Doja	Elisabetin	45°44′52″N 21°13′15″E		0.52	
Karlsruhe Park (former name: Bihor Park)	Parcul Karlsruhe	Complexul Studențesc	45°44′46″N 21°14′42″E	1980s		
Lidia Park	Parcul Lidia	Soarelui	45°44′0″N 21°14′35″E	1929	9.03	
Queen Marie Park	Parcul Regina Maria	Fabric	45°45′19″N 21°14′33″E	1868	4.51	
Sándor Petőfi Park	Parcul Sándor Petőfi	Freidorf	45°43′39″N 21°10′52″E			
Soarelui Park (former name: South Park)	Parcul Soarelui	Soarelui	45°44′2″N 21°14′56″E			
Stadium Park	Parcul Stadion	Olimpia–Stadion	45°44′23″N 21°14′28″E		7.09	
Triade Park	Parcul Triade	Girocului	45°43′42″N 21°14′15″E			
Vasile Adamachi Park	Parcul Vasile Adamachi	Elisabetin	45°44′23″N 21°13′55″E			
Vasile Pârvan Park	Parcul Vasile Pârvan	Complexul Studențesc	45°45′1″N 21°14′11″E		5.99	
