= Bastion, Timișoara =

Coordinates: 45°45′25″N 21°14′0″E

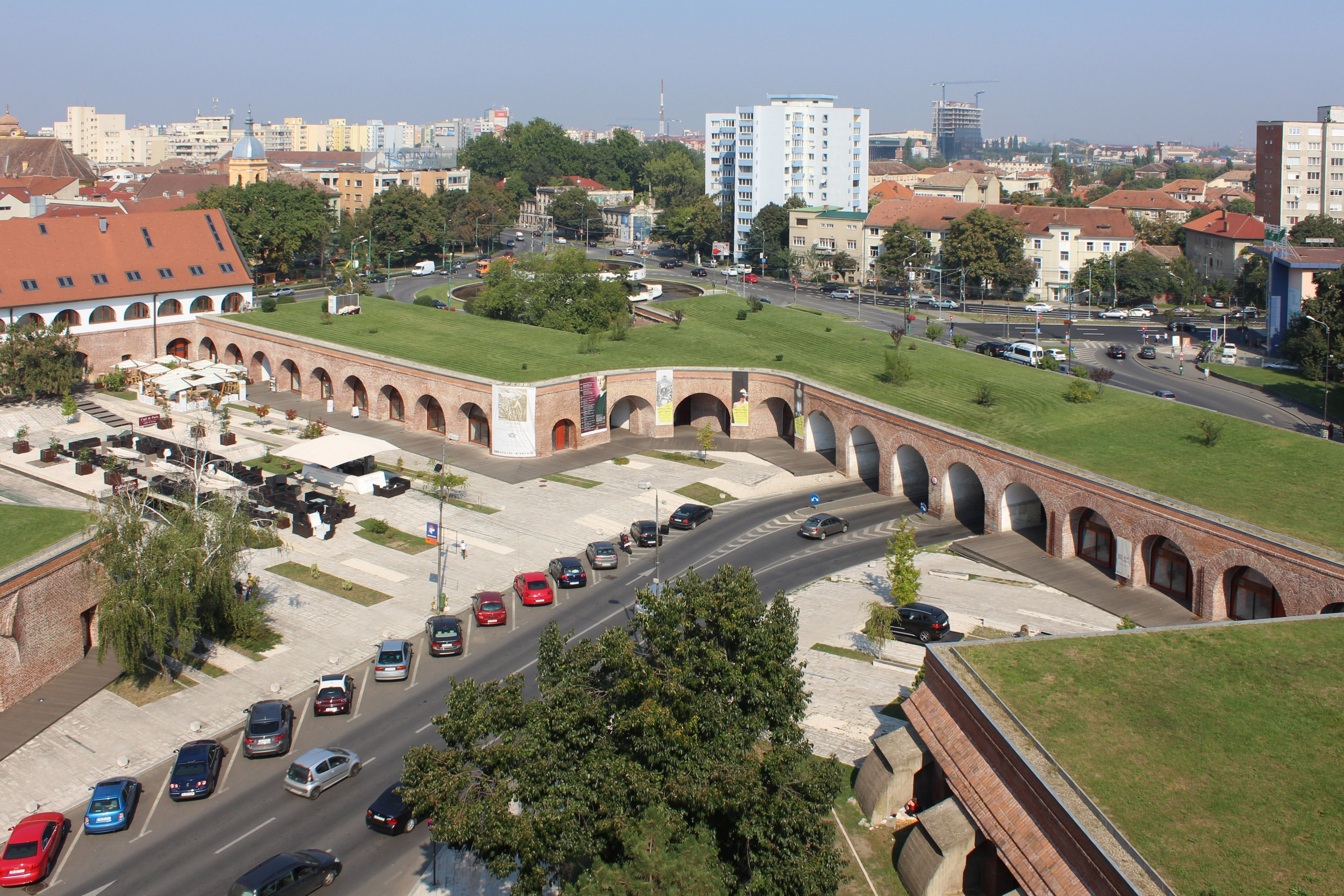
Overview of the Theresia Bastion and the district

Bastion is a suburban district situated immediately outside the former fortress area of Timișoara, close to the district Tipografilor and adjacent to—but not part of—Cetate. It takes its name from the Theresia Bastion, one of the few surviving bastions of the historic Vauban-style fortification built in the 18th century. As the majority of Timișoara's fortifications were dismantled in the late 19th century, this bastion remained because of its robust above-ground casemates and continued utility.

Although the bastion remains the district's central landmark, the surrounding area includes residential neighborhoods, commercial properties, and several key institutions—such as the Victor Babeș University of Medicine and Pharmacy, the Administrative Palace, the Timiș County Police Inspectorate, Carmen Sylva National Pedagogical College, and Constantin Diaconovici Loga National College. The district is also bordered by a series of parks along the Bega Canal, including Ion Creangă Children's Park, Vasile Pârvan Park, and Andrei Mocioni Park.

Despite being adjacent to the inner city, Bastion district maintains a mixed-use character, balancing heritage, housing, education, and light urban life.

== See also ==
- Theresia Bastion
