= Take Ionescu Boulevard =

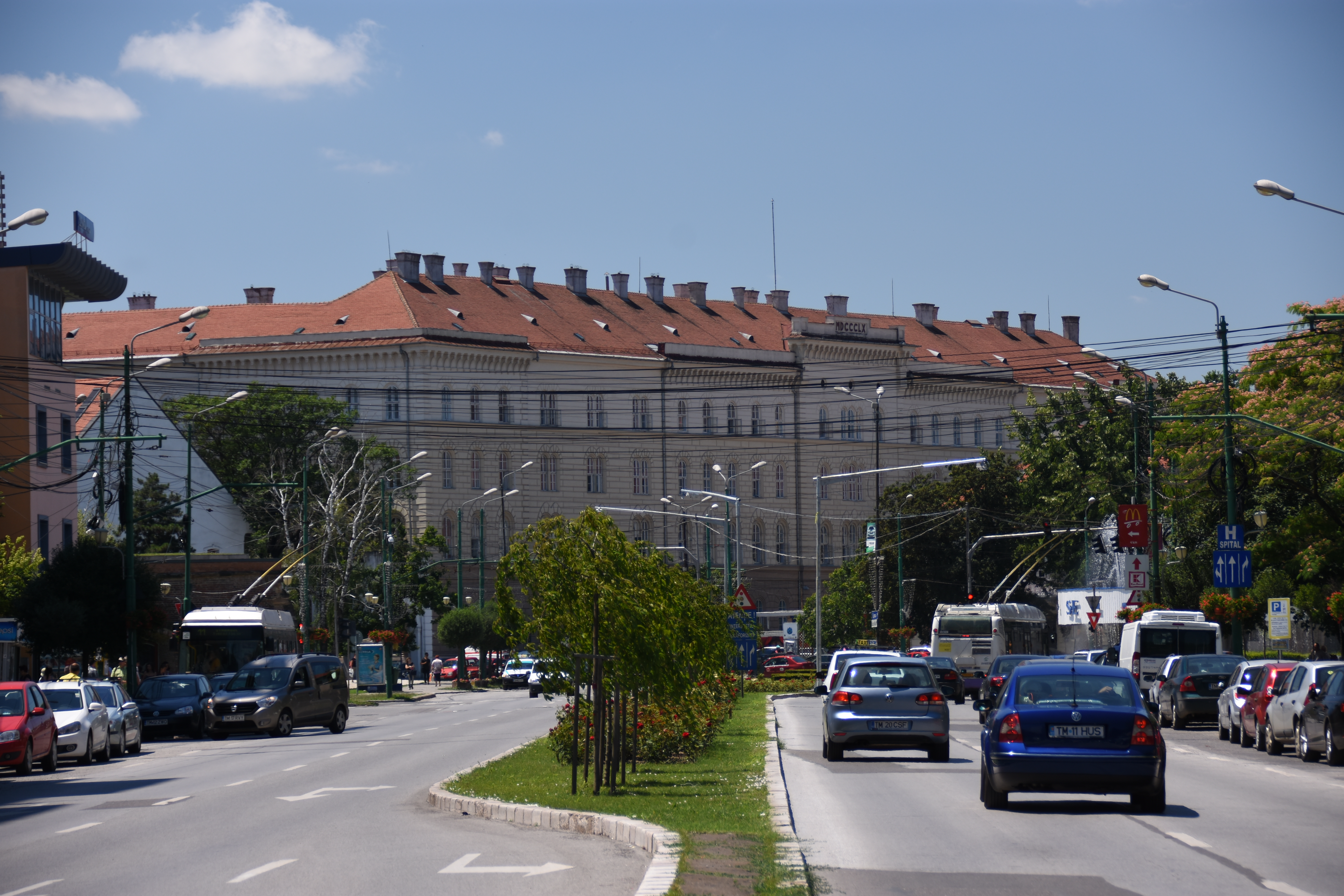
- Dicasterial Palace as seen from Take Ionescu Boulevard
- Interactive map of Take Ionescu Boulevard
- Native name: Bulevardul Take Ionescu (Romanian)
- Former names: Stalingrad Heroes, Leontin Sălăjan
- Maintained by: Timișoara City Hall
- Length: 1,259.05 m (4,130.7 ft)
- Location: Timișoara, Romania
- Coordinates: 45°45′37″N 21°14′27″E
- From: Ion I. C. Brătianu Square
- To: Simion Bărnuțiu Boulevard

Take Ionescu Boulevard (Romanian: Bulevardul Take Ionescu) is a boulevard in Timișoara, Romania. One of the busiest boulevards in the city, Take Ionescu Boulevard forms part of Timișoara's second urban ring, a vital corridor that slices through roughly a quarter of the city, including key areas such as Badea Cârțan Market and Trajan Square. Along the boulevard are located the Timiș County Police Inspectorate, as well as the ISHO edge city, built on the site of the former ILSA wool processing factory.

At the eastern end of Take Ionescu Boulevard is situated Ion I. C. Brătianu Square, one of Timișoara's principal roundabouts. Dominating the square is the Fountain of Cardinal Points, an iconic landmark constructed in 1978, notable for its prominent directional markers (N, NE, E, and so forth). In close proximity, the remnants of the Theresia Bastion and the Dicasterial Palace contribute additional historical and institutional value to the surrounding urban landscape.

== Transport ==
The boulevard is served by several public transport routes, including bus lines E6, E7, M36, M43, and M51, as well as trolleybus lines 11, 17, 28, M11, and M30.
