= Braytim =

District of Timișoara, Romania

Coordinates: 45.7231882°N 21.2479379°E

Braytim or Braytim–Timișoara Sud is a district of Timișoara. It is located in the southern part of the city, being the first residential district built in Timișoara after 1989. It borders five other subdivisions of the city, namely Soarelui to the north, Buziașului to the northeast, Ciarda Roșie to the east, Planetelor to the south, and Girocului to the west.

Its name comes from the construction company that built the first houses here. (Note: Braytim was a 49:51-owned Romanian-French joint venture between TCM Timiș (today Constructim) and Maisons Pierre Bac from Saint-Jean-de-Braye. The name comes from joining the names Bray, from Saint-Jean-de-Braye, and Tim, from Timișoara.) Private constructions began in 1991, and the model was taken over and spread around the city in the following years. Basically, the land was parceled out and sold, and the owners built villas with one or more floors, before there was an architectural concept or plan for the entire area. At that time, the target was the construction of 900 homes, being planned, until the second half of 1992, the construction of 17 buildings according to the plans of IPROTIM, under the direction of architect Alina Anastasescu. In June 1997, only 28 buildings were built, and in September of the same year, 39. In 1998, Timișoara City Hall considered a local urban development plan for the neighborhood, which included proposals such as allocating land for green spaces and sports facilities, extending South Boulevard, and upgrading Calea Urseni.

Triade Park, the first sculpture park in Romania (2003), is located in this district; it features works by Hungarian sculptor Péter Jecza and other local artists. The area is also noted for the fountains of the Urseni Water Plant, over a hundred years old.
