= Military Church, Timișoara =

Romanian church

Military Church
- Biserica Militară
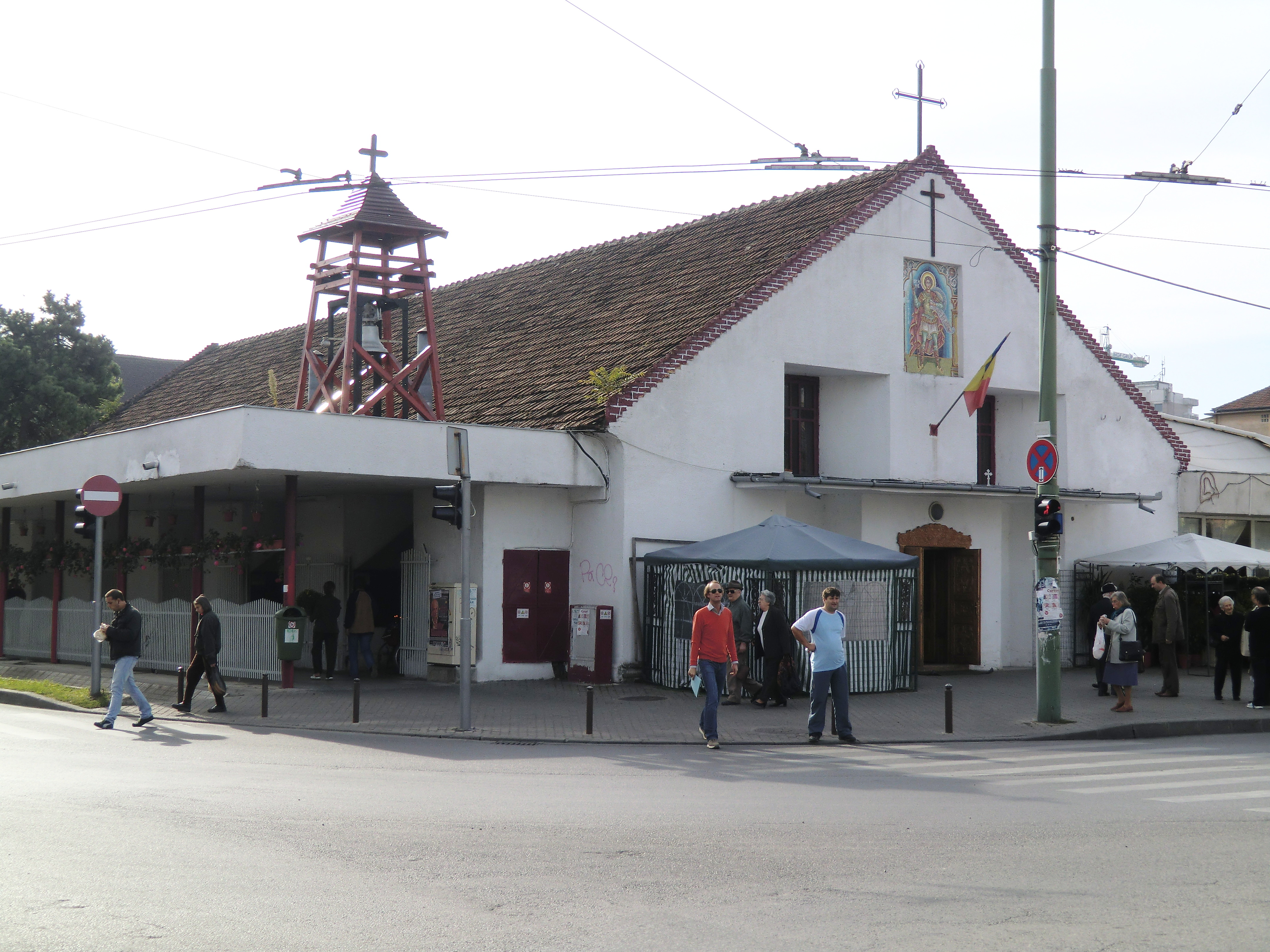

Religion
- Affiliation: Romanian Orthodox
- Patron: Saint Demetrius
- Year consecrated: 1935, 2000
- Status: Active

Location
- Location: 1 Paris Street, Timișoara, Romania
- Interactive map of Military Church
- Coordinates: 45°45′25.3″N 21°13′26″E

Architecture
- Type: Church
- Established: 1919

The Military Church (Romanian: Biserica Militară) is a Romanian Orthodox church located in the 700 Square of the western Romanian city of Timișoara. The building, dating from 1740 to 1750, is one of the oldest surviving structures in the city, alongside the Military Hospital, the Tribunal, and the Theresia Bastion. It forms part of the architectural ensemble of Timișoara's old citadel.

== History ==
The Orthodox church in 700 Square is the oldest Romanian place of worship that once stood within the Timișoara Citadel. It was established shortly after the unification of Banat in 1919, serving as the church for the Military Garrison—well before the construction of the Cathedral in the city center. Located next to the defensive wall, the church stood beside the Eugene Bastion.

A plan of the Military Hospital area dated 14 September 1776 shows a structure to the west—largely resembling its current form—located in the central part of the old Bastion. It was most likely one of the annex buildings of the military barracks within the Vauban-style fortress constructed in the 18th century.

According to the information on the commemorative plaque located to the left of the main entrance, construction of the church as a military Orthodox place of worship began in 1919. It was first consecrated in 1935, during the reign of King Carol II, by Military Bishop Ioan Stroia of Alba Iulia and Bishop Grigorie Comșa of Arad, and was dedicated to "The Resurrection of the Lord." The church was consecrated a second time on 26 October 2000 by Metropolitan Nicolae of Banat, at which time it also received a second patron saint—Saint Demetrius.

A 1941 map of Timișoara shows the building surrounded by a fairly large landscaped park, located between Coriolan Brediceanu Street and Gheorghe Lazăr Street. In 1948, following the establishment of the communist regime in Romania, the church was closed and repurposed for various functions, including use as warehouses and storage spaces for goods and food.

The interior of the church was painted between 2000 and 2003 by the church painters Ion and Ana Bădilă. Since 1 February 2008, it has also served as the parish church for the faithful in Timișoara's Cetate district, which includes around 730 families. The parish is served by four priests, with Marcel Vlaicu as the parish priest.

== Architecture ==
The church is a sturdy structure, built around 1750, featuring walls nearly two meters thick. It follows the traditional nave layout, with a vaulted ceiling and the classic divisions: porch, narthex, nave, and altar. Notably, it lacks a spire; instead, a wooden bell tower is mounted on the awning to the right of the main entrance.

== Trivia ==
The church gained media attention following the terrorist attacks of 11 September 2001. At the time, the artist couple Ion and Ana Bădilă were working on frescoes inside the church and, influenced by the tragic events in New York, created a scene titled Coborârea din Rai ("The Descent from Heaven"). In this depiction, Osama bin Laden appears as Satan, sitting on an airplane with a pitchfork, flying toward the World Trade Center.

In Romanian Orthodox church art, it is not unusual for evil to be represented with recognizable human features. For instance, frescoes in Moldavian monasteries often portray Turkish military leaders as embodiments of Satan. In Timișoara, one church painting even depicts former president Ion Iliescu in a similar manner.
