= Olimpia–Stadion =

District of Timișoara, Romania

Coordinates: 45.740556°N 21.244167°E

Olimpia–Stadion is a northern district of Timișoara, Romania, bordering Complexul Studențesc and the Soarelui district. It takes its name from the local major sports venues, namely Dan Păltinișanu Stadium and Constantin Jude Sports Hall (formerly "Olimpia Hall").

Although not a traditional historic neighborhood, Olimpia–Stadion developed largely through late‑20th-century residential expansion, especially to house workers and students near the sports complex and the nearby Student Complex district. Its apartment buildings date roughly from the 1970s–1980s. Today it contains a mix of mid-rise apartment blocks (some brick-built, some prefabricated) with convenient access to public transport and urban amenities.

== Transport ==
The neighborhood is well-served by tram lines 6 and 8, which stop at "Olimpia" near the stadium. Other connections include metro‑style bus lines (M36, M50, etc.), standard routes (21, E2, E3, E7, etc.), and trolleybus line 15.
