= Lidia Park =

Urban park in Timișoara, Romania

- Pădurice Park
- Parcul Lidia
- Interactive map of Lidia Park
- Type: Urban park
- Location: Timișoara, Romania
- Coordinates: 45°44′0″N 21°14′35″E
- Area: 9.03 ha
- Administrator: Timișoara City Hall
- Species: 62

Lidia Park (Romanian: Parcul Lidia), officially named Pădurice Park (pădurice meaning "small forest") since 2015, is an urban park in Timișoara, Romania. A nursery in the 1900s, the park was remodeled 90 years later, the current structure existing since 1999, when the alleys were laid out. With an area of 9.03 hectares, Lidia Park is the largest in Timișoara.

== Location ==
Lidia Park is located in the southern part of Timișoara, near the Soarelui district, being bordered to:

- south, by Marshal Constantin Prezan Street (formerly Lidia Street),
- east, by Uranus Street,
- west, by Versului Street,
- north, by the Waldorf High School grounds.

== History ==
Lidia Park was laid out in 1900, being thought of as a nursery with a greenhouse, a stable and a house, where thousands of trees were grown and later planted in the city. During the war, the dendrological material matured, the land becoming a forest.

At the beginning of the 1980s, three asphalted lanes were laid out in the north–south direction, which intersected with two lanes bordering the park on the north and south sides. In 1999, the park was rehabilitated, on this occasion being extended on the west side to Versului Street, and on the south side to Lidia Street. Also on this occasion, the rosarium in the southern part of the park was laid out, a lot of trees and shrubs were planted and the bushes that bordered the paths were removed, and a playground was laid out in the southeastern part of the park.

At the beginning of the 2000s, the Maranata Baptist Church was built on a portion of the park.

In 2016, a new renovation took place, during which the alleys were redesigned, a small lake, a rockery with a waterfall, a skatepark and a playground were set up.

== Layout ==
As part of the 2016 rehabilitation, the park was divided into seven gardens or thematic areas, inspired by the Butchart Gardens in Canada and Keukenhof in the Netherlands:

- the English Medieval Garden features a Celtic knot within a labyrinth.
- the Biblical Garden is a circular flower bed, divided by a green hedge in the shape of a cross.
- the Italian Garden showcases Tuscan-style red brick masonry along a tree-lined alley.
- the Modern Garden serves as an outdoor office, with sun and air beds placed within the surrounding lawn.
- the Spanish Garden is a monastic classical garden with cross-shaped alleyway layout.
- the Greek Garden centers around a mini-amphitheater.
- the Romantic Garden includes a rosarium, a water lilies lake, a birdhouse, and an ornamental rockery.
