= Ion I. C. Brătianu Square =

Square in Timișoara, Romania

- City square
- {{{other_names}}}
- Piața Ion I. C. Brătianu
- Former name: Dr. N. Russel Square
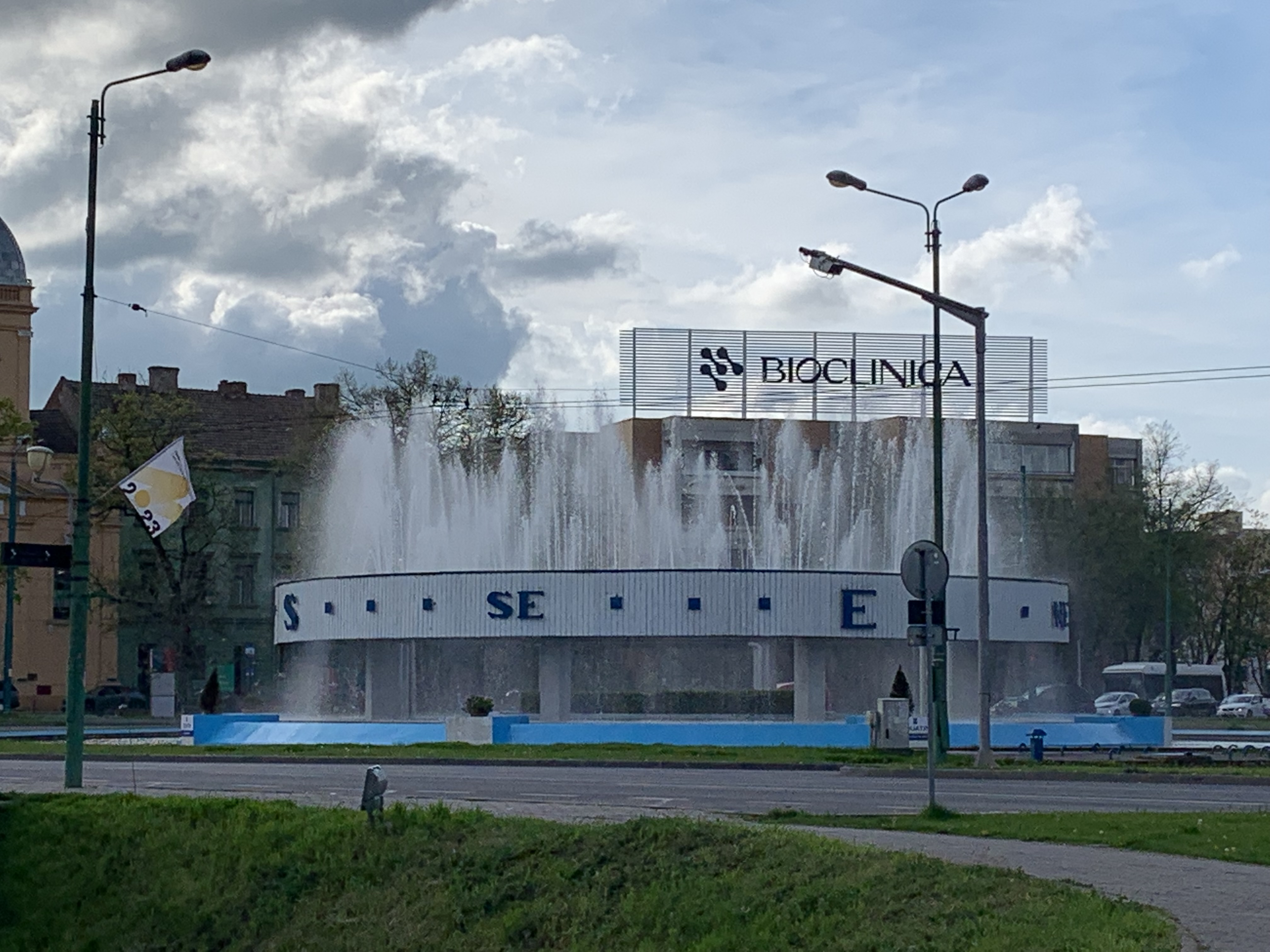
- Fountain of Cardinal Points roundabout
- Length: 305.36 m
- Dedicated to: Ion I. C. Brătianu
- Location: Cetate, Timișoara
- Interactive map of Ion I. C. Brătianu Square
- Coordinates: 45°45′28″N 21°13′58″E

Ion I. C. Brătianu Square, formerly known as Dr. N. Russel Square, is an urban square in the Cetate district of Timișoara, Romania. It is named after the former Romanian prime minister Ion I. C. Brătianu (1864–1927).

== Layout ==
Hector Street, Martin Luther Street, Popa Șapcă Street and Take Ionescu Boulevard lead here into a roundabout that surrounds a fountain indicating the cardinal points in the middle of the square.

To the north and east, the square is lined with residential and commercial buildings; a striking point here is the modern building of Telco, designed as a small tower on a square area. At the southern end of the square are the remains of the Theresia Bastion, part of the historic fortifications. The National Museum of Banat is also located here, as well as some shops, restaurants and art galleries.

At the southwestern corner of the square, the Dicasterial Palace extends over an entire block of buildings. The palace is the largest public building in the city and the seat of the Timiș Court of Justice and several other legal administrative offices, as well as financial and law firms. The path leads past it via Țepeș Vodă Square to Union Square.

To the west of the square there is a narrow group of trees, Parcul Mic ("Little Park"), also containing a playground. In the row of houses behind the group of trees on George Coșbuc Street are, among others, the House with Iron Axle and the Lutheran Church.

== Gallery ==
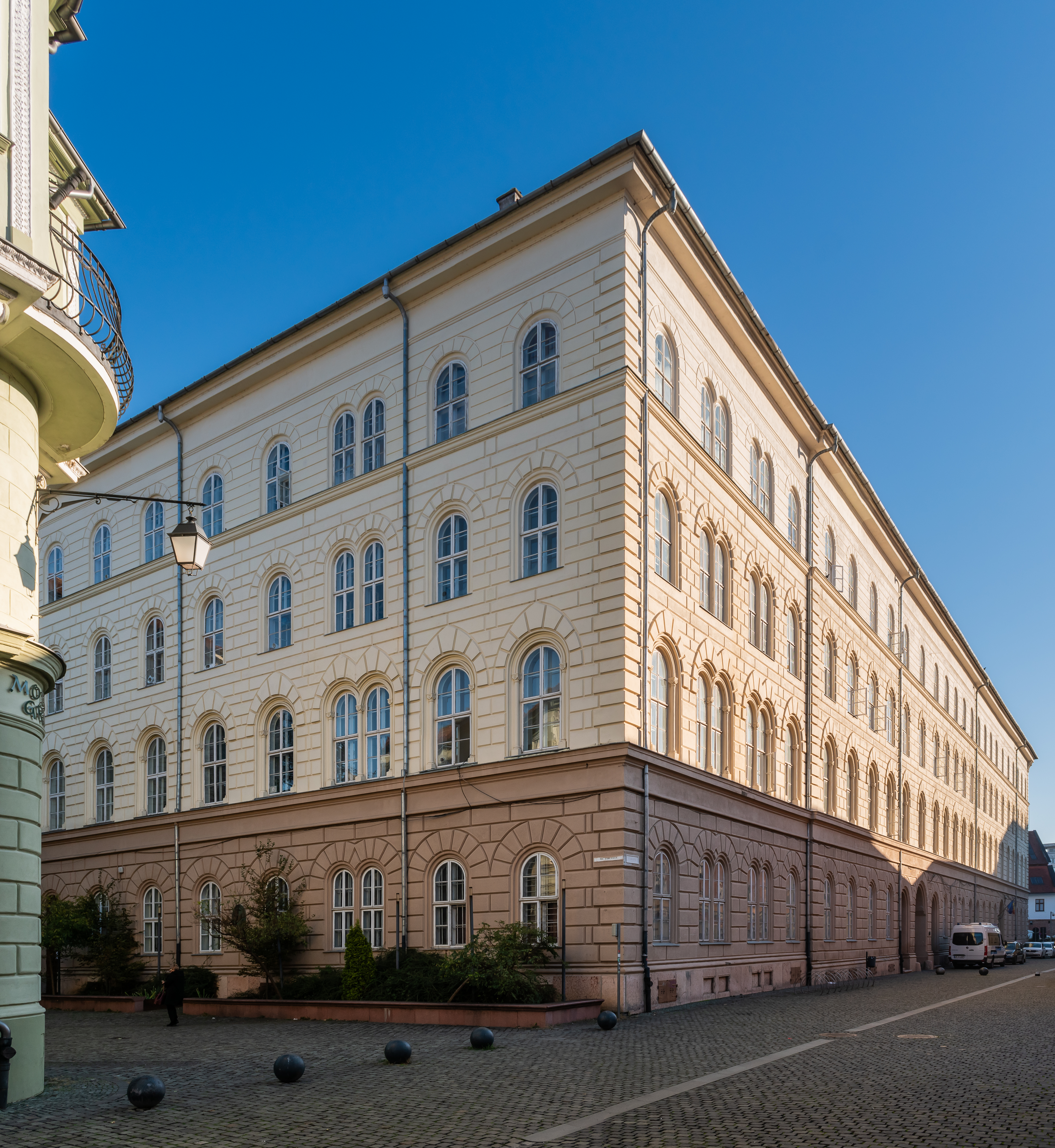
Dicasterial Palace

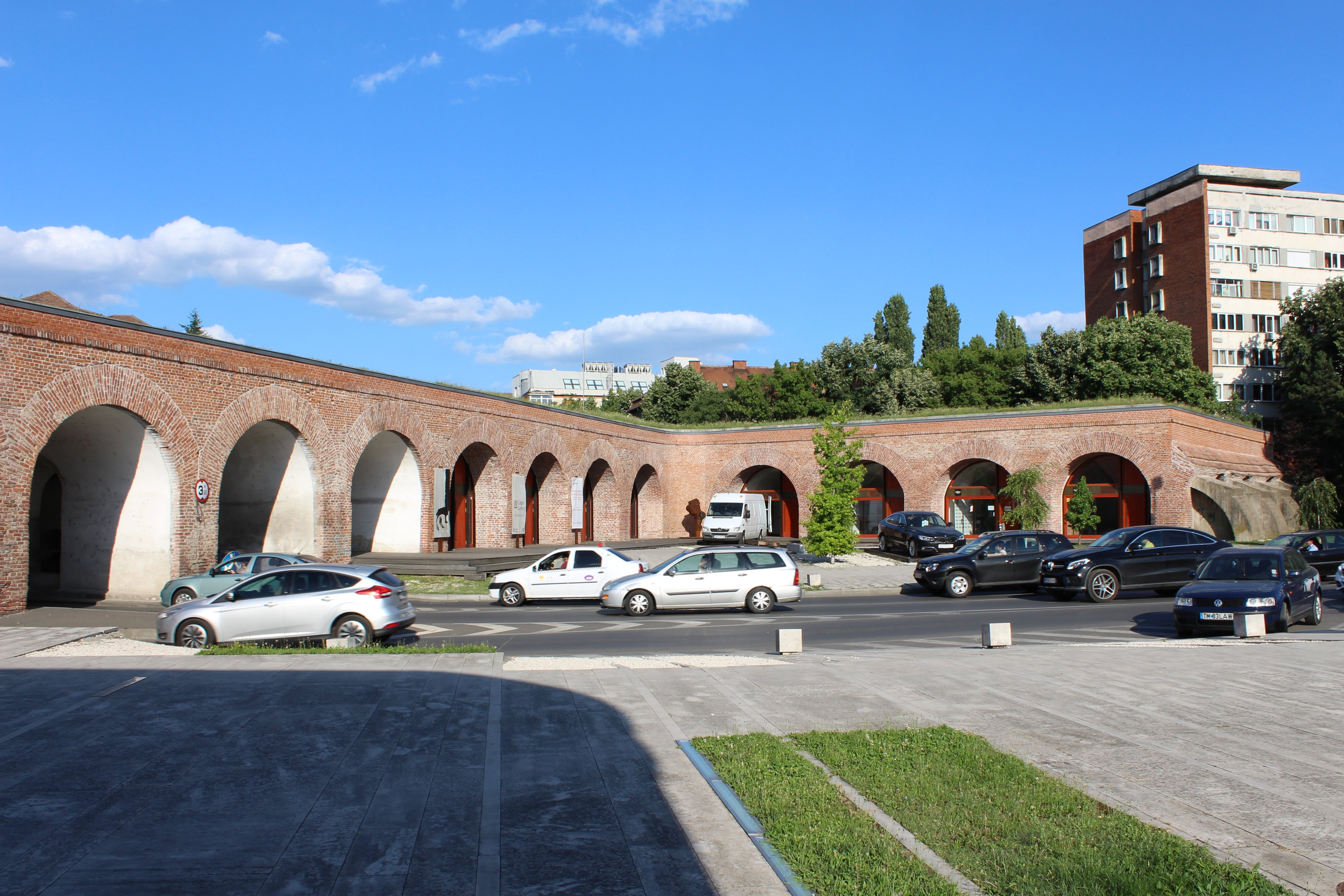
Road passage through the Theresia Bastion

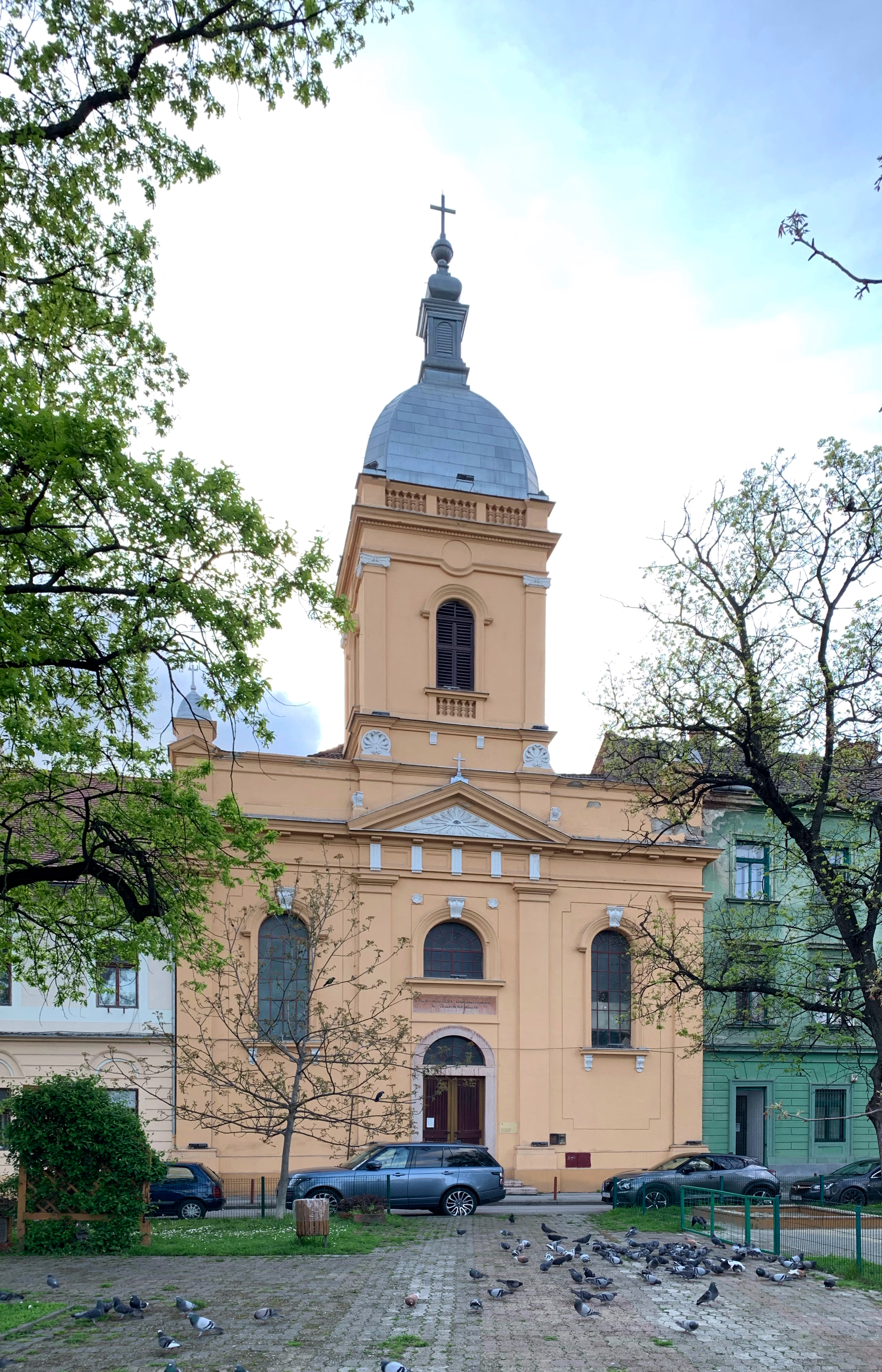
Lutheran Church

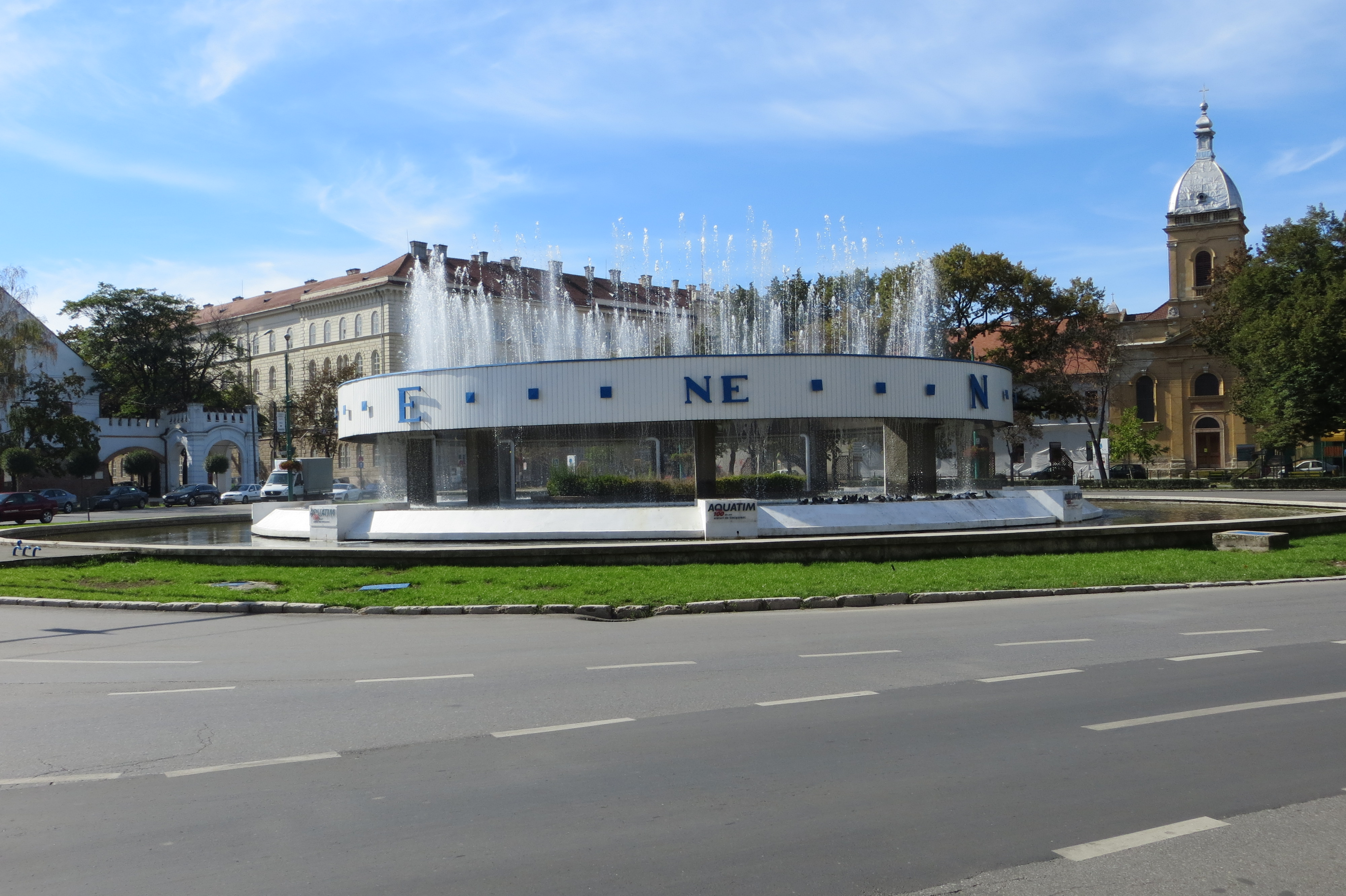
Fountain of Cardinal Points
