= Aradului =

District of Timișoara, Romania

Coordinates: 45°46′36.5″N 21°12′19.96″E

Aradului is a district in northern Timișoara. Its name comes from the homonymous road (Calea Aradului) that connects Timișoara to Arad. Calea Aradului divides the district into two: Aradului Vest and Aradului Est. The King Michael I University of Life Sciences is located in this district.

Until the late 19th century, the area was mostly vineyards known as Viile Fabric, producing up to 100 hectares of local wine consumed by Timișoara's well‑to‑do residents. In 1905, the first textile industry in Timișoara was built on Calea Aradului, with the aim of producing cotton spinning. During the communist era, it was called UTT (Timișoara Textile Factories), many of the employees coming from all over Romania receiving housing in the blocks that were built in the area.

== Transport ==
Public transport is provided by trolleybus lines 17 and 18 and express lines E1, E2 and E6.

== Gallery ==
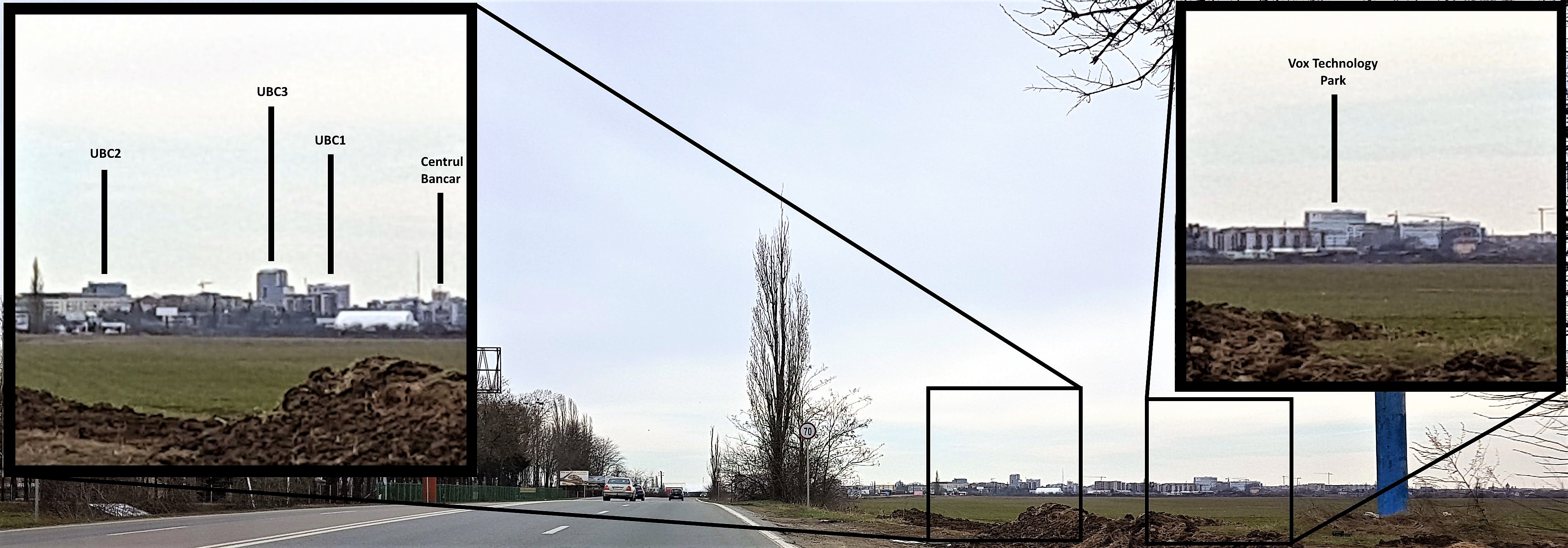
Panorama of Aradului in March 2019
