= Fountain of Cardinal Points =

Fountain in Timișoara, Romania

- Fountain
- {{{other_names}}}
- Fântâna Punctelor Cardinale
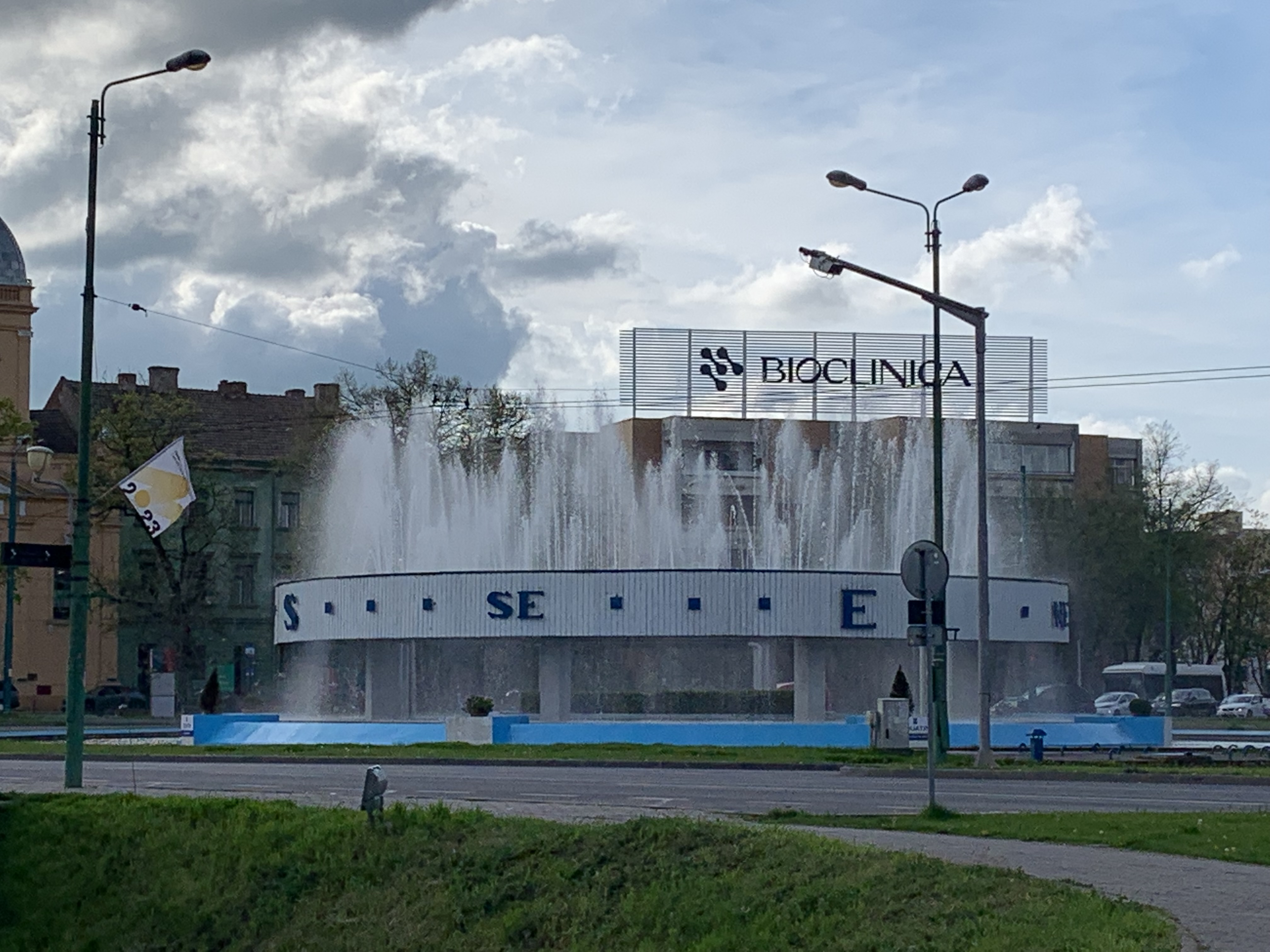
- The fountain as of 2023
- Design: Ștefan Iojică
- Completed: 1978
- Dimensions: 44 m in diameter
- Manager: Aquatim
- Location: Timișoara, Romania
- Interactive map of Fountain of Cardinal Points
- Coordinates: 45°45′28″N 21°13′58″E

Fountain of Cardinal Points is one of the representative fountains of Timișoara, being located near Ion I. C. Brătianu Square, at the intersection of Oituz Street and Take Ionescu Boulevard.

== History ==
Designed by IPROTIM, under the direction of architect Ștefan Iojică, the fountain was built in 1978. What characterizes this fountain are the decorative letters that mark the four cardinal points (N, E, S and W) and the four intercardinal points (NE, SE, SW and NW). The fountain runs daily from 7:30 a.m. to 9 p.m. Initially, its structure was painted orange, but, after a rehabilitation in 2012, the fountain got the colors white and blue. The new color scheme was made possible by switching from water supply from a drilling rig to recirculated water from the public network. In the past, drilling water was rich in salts that left a brownish tint, and the colors had to mask this effect.
