= New Millennium Reformed Center =

- Új Ezredév Református Központ
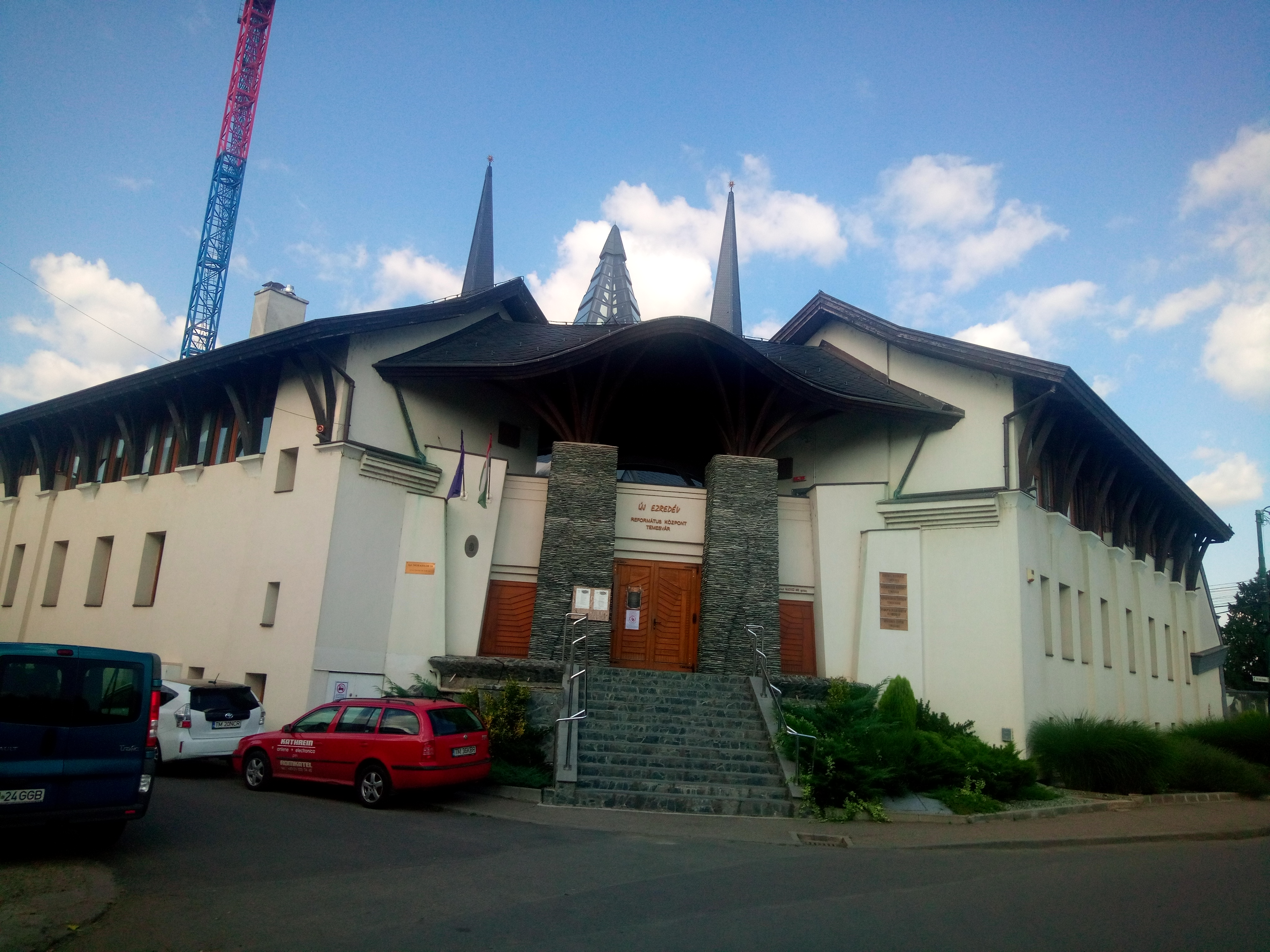

General information
- Architectural style: Organic
- Address: Splaiul Morarilor 1B
- Coordinates: 45.7595343°N 21.2579036°E
- Year(s) built: 1999–present

Design and construction
- Architect(s): Imre Makovecz
- Engineer: Tamás Nagy-György; Petru Todea

Website
- www.ujezredev.ro

The New Millennium Reformed Center (Hungarian: Új Ezredév Református Központ) is a cultural and ecumenical center in the Fabric district of Timișoara, Romania, which includes a church, a boardroom, a concert hall, a club and games room and offers accommodation. Designed by Hungarian architect Imre Makovecz, it also hosts the Honorary Consulate of Hungary in Timișoara.

== History ==
The foundation stone was laid on 3 November 1999. The project was donated by Imre Makovecz immediately after the Revolution of 1989, with respect for the then pastor, László Tőkés. Initially, the city hall provided three locations for the center, Makovecz being the one who chose the current location.

The works were stopped in 2002 due to lack of funds. By that time, only the accommodation and temporary office spaces in the east wing, the basement of the south wing, and the church had been fully completed.

Construction resumed in 2013 with a €1.5 million cross-border EU grant, and by 2014, the southern wing was nearly fully completed. Furthermore, the fourth Orbán government allocated €5 million in 2018 for the completion of the works, as part of a project to support the cultural heritage of Makovecz, who died in 2011. In 2017, the construction of the chamber music concert hall building was also successfully completed with EU funds.

== Amenities ==
=== Church ===
It was inaugurated on 15 December 2019, on the 30th anniversary of the outbreak of the Romanian Revolution.

The church is composed of two wings, three domes and two towers. It has a floor area of approximately 32 × 21 m and a total height of 28 m. The lighting structure (opeion) is approximately 11 m high and weighs 8,000 kg, on which there is also a chandelier structure weighing 1,200 kg. The two adjacent winged towers have a base of 5.8 × 5.8 m, walls up to 26 m made of reinforced concrete, which are closed by a 16 m high wooden cap. Thus, the total height of the towers is 40 m. The nave of the church, with its circular gallery, can accommodate 500 people.

The church hosts the only mechanical organ in Timișoara, with 25 registers and two manuals, built in the workshop of organ builder Péter Sándor from Sânsimion.

=== Concert hall ===
The chamber concert hall was inaugurated on 26 May 2019. Equipped with a concert piano and sound system, the hall is also used by the Banatul Philharmonic.
