= Ukrainian Church, Timișoara =

Ukrainian Orthodox church in Timișoara, Romania

Ukrainian Church
- Українська Церква

Religion
- Affiliation: Ukrainian Orthodox
- Ownership: Lugoj Deanery
- Patron: Assumption of Mary; Seraphim of Sarov
- Year consecrated: 2020
- Status: Active

Location
- Location: Marshal Alexandru Averescu Street, Timișoara
- Interactive map of Ukrainian Church
- Coordinates: 45.7328138°N 21.2197713°E

Architecture
- Architects: Elena Laslo; Mariana Fuchs
- Groundbreaking: 2010
- Completed: 2020

Specifications
- Site area: 1,818 m^{2} (19,570 sq ft)
- Materials: Brick

Website
- www.bisericaucraineanatm.ro

The Ukrainian Church (Ukrainian: Українська Церква, romanized: Ukrayinsʹka Tserkva) is a Ukrainian Orthodox church in Timișoara, Romania. The Ukrainian Orthodox parish in Timișoara was founded on 10 December 2001 and currently has over 100 families.

== History ==
The Ukrainian Orthodox parish in Timișoara is among the youngest Ukrainian parishes in Banat. The first liturgy in the Ukrainian language was celebrated on 21 May 2001, in the basement of the Metropolitan Cathedral in the city. The parish per se was established on 10 December 2001, according to founding decision no. 371 issued by the Ukrainian Orthodox Vicariate of Sighetu Marmației.

Between 2001 and 2005, the liturgy was celebrated in the basement of the Metropolitan Cathedral, with the blessing of the Metropolitan of Banat, Nicolae Corneanu. The first parish priest was Cristian Vasile Ardelean (April 2002–March 2003), followed by Cristian Vasile Popovici (August 2003–present).

By a decision of the local council of 24 February 2004, the parish received a plot of land for the construction of a church with an area of 1,818 m^{2}, located on Lidia Street, during the mandate of Gheorghe Ciuhandu. The foundation stone of the new place of worship, dedicated to the Assumption of Virgin Mary, was laid on 14 November 2004 in the presence of the Bishop of Caransebeș, Lucian Lugojanu. With the contribution of the parish priest and the Ukrainian and Romanian worshipers, a small wooden church was built in the summer of 2005. In September of the same year, Lucian Lugojanu decided to consecrate the church with the relics of the Holy Martyr Catherine. In the summer of 2010, the foundation of the brick church was laid, based on building permit no. 2128 of 20 September 2004. The construction of the church actually started in July 2012.

The church project was executed by architect Elena Laslo, in collaboration with architect Mariana Fuchs. The project is made according to the model of Slavic churches, on a square plan, with three circular apses to the east and a slender spire on the nave, covered with an elongated spherical dome, shaped like an onion bulb. Above the portico that shelters the entrance to the church rise the zvonnitsy.

The church was completed in 2020. Metropolitan Ioan Selejan consecrated it on 30 August 2020 to the Assumption of Virgin Mary and Saint Seraphim of Sarov. Painting in the fresco technique began in 2023.
