= Complexul Studențesc =

University-oriented district of Timisoara, Romania

Coordinates: 45°44′57″N 21°14′21″E

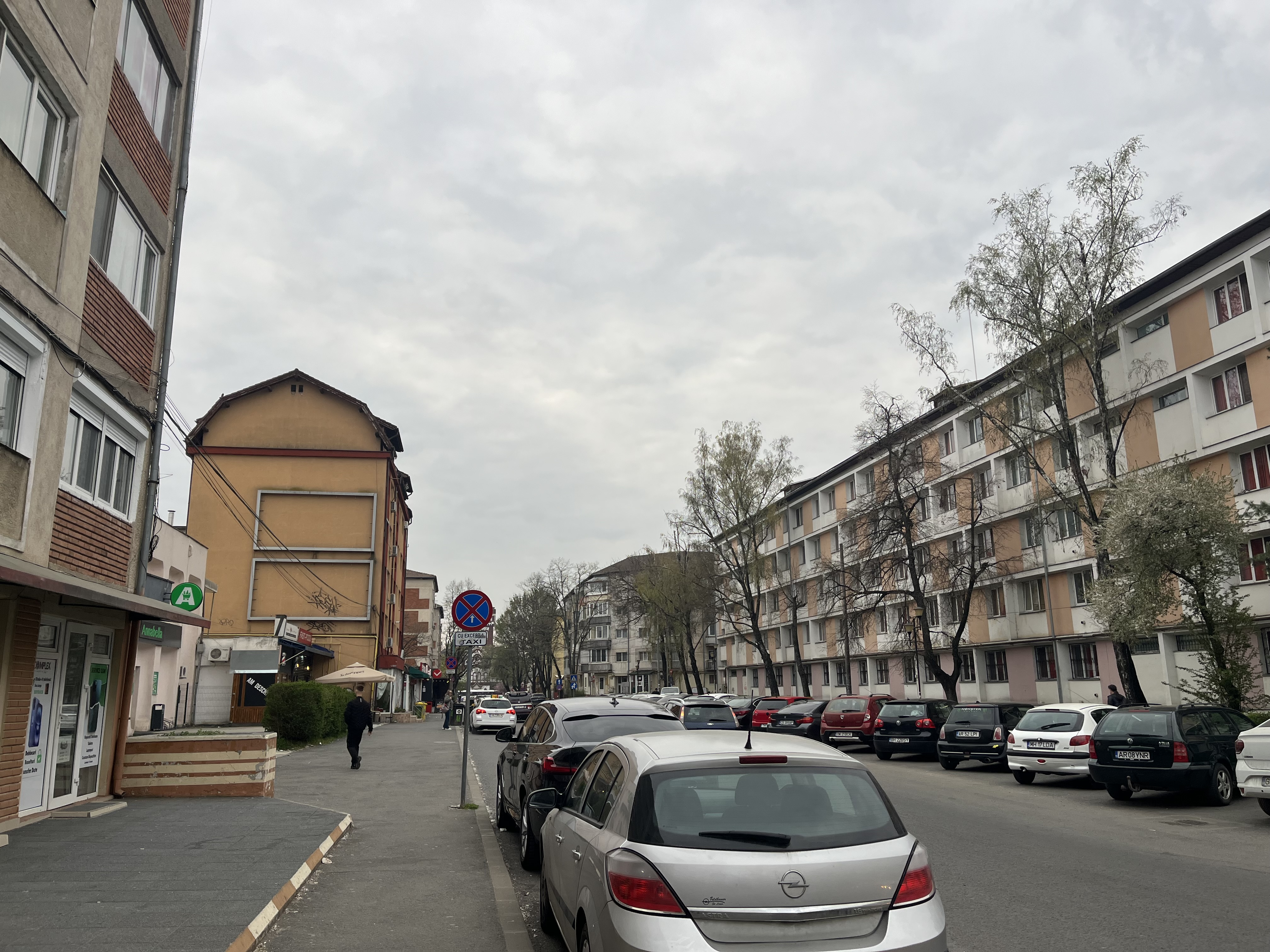
Student dormitories in Complexul Studențesc

Complexul Studențesc (Romanian for "Student Complex") is a large district of Timișoara, Timiș, Banat, West, Romania, located on the banks of the Bega Canal.

Complexul Studențesc is among the largest academic areas in the country. Four of the city's higher education institutions and their respective campuses are located here – West University, Politehnica University, Tibiscus University and Dimitrie Cantemir Christian University, along with the Timișoara Branch of the Romanian Academy, as well as numerous research institutes and centres located nearby. The neighborhood has a population of over 30,000 citizens. It is adjacent to the Cetate, Tipografilor, Fabric, and Olimpia-Stadion districts.

It is one of the densest areas of the city in terms of population. Here there are several dozen student dormitories, noted for their murals, which house more than 10,000 students annually. The area is also noted for its vibrant nightlife, with dozens of bars, pubs, and clubs bordering the main pedestrian alley – Aleea Studenților ("Students' Alley"), as well as numerous themed venues offering food services: restaurants, student cafeterias, cafés, pizzerias and fast-food outlets belonging to domestic and international chains, as well as related services: shops, supermarkets, various retail/wholesale outlets, etc.
