= Ciarda Roșie =

District in Timișoara, Romania

Coordinates: 45°43′26.3″N 21°15′5.95″E

Ciarda Roșie (Hungarian: Vöröscsárda; German: Rotterhof or Rote Tscharda) is a district in southeastern Timișoara. In its beginnings, Ciarda Roșie was a Hungarian village that was formed in the interwar period around the Vörös Csárda inn (transl. "Red Inn"); later, this name was assigned to the entire district.

== Geography ==
The district, located in the southeast of the city, covers an area of 102 hectares, mostly south of the road to Buziaș.

== History ==
The Vörös Csárda inn was built at the beginning of the 19th century, presumably in the 1800s and 1810s, at the edge of now disappeared Köplinger forest. The Köplinger family previously established and operated a brick kiln in the loess, clay area, which was maintained and operated even after the inn was built. The inn was notorious for the executions and killings that purportedly took place in and around it; most of these were refuted as rumors. Some stories go as far as claiming that its walls were painted red to symbolize blood. The inn may have been operating up until 1930, when the new owners renamed it Petőffy and built a summer garden.

During the mid-19th century, a gang of looters robbed travelers who entered the city from Moșnița. They were supposedly led by Hungarian outlaw Sándor Rózsa (1813–1878) and often took refuge in a makeshift camp in what is now Ciarda Roșie. However, many historians dispute that Rózsa ever arrived in this area.

In the 1900s, several workers' houses began to be built around the inn. As the area was crossed by many travelers, the settlement developed rapidly. In that period, Ciarda Roșie belonged to Moșnița Nouă; it has had several names over time: Vöröscsárdatelep, Illéspuszta, Illancs, Rotterpuszta. In 1937, the inhabitants of Ciarda Roșie requested the Prefecture its separation from Moșnița Nouă and subsequent annexation to Urseni under a new name – Stupari. The action never materialized. The village was annexed to the city in 1953, when it became the 10th constituency of Timișoara.

== Transport ==
Public transport is provided by express line E2 and tram lines 4, 8 and 9.
