= Andrei Mocioni Park =

Park in Timisoara, Romania

- Parcul Andrei Mocioni
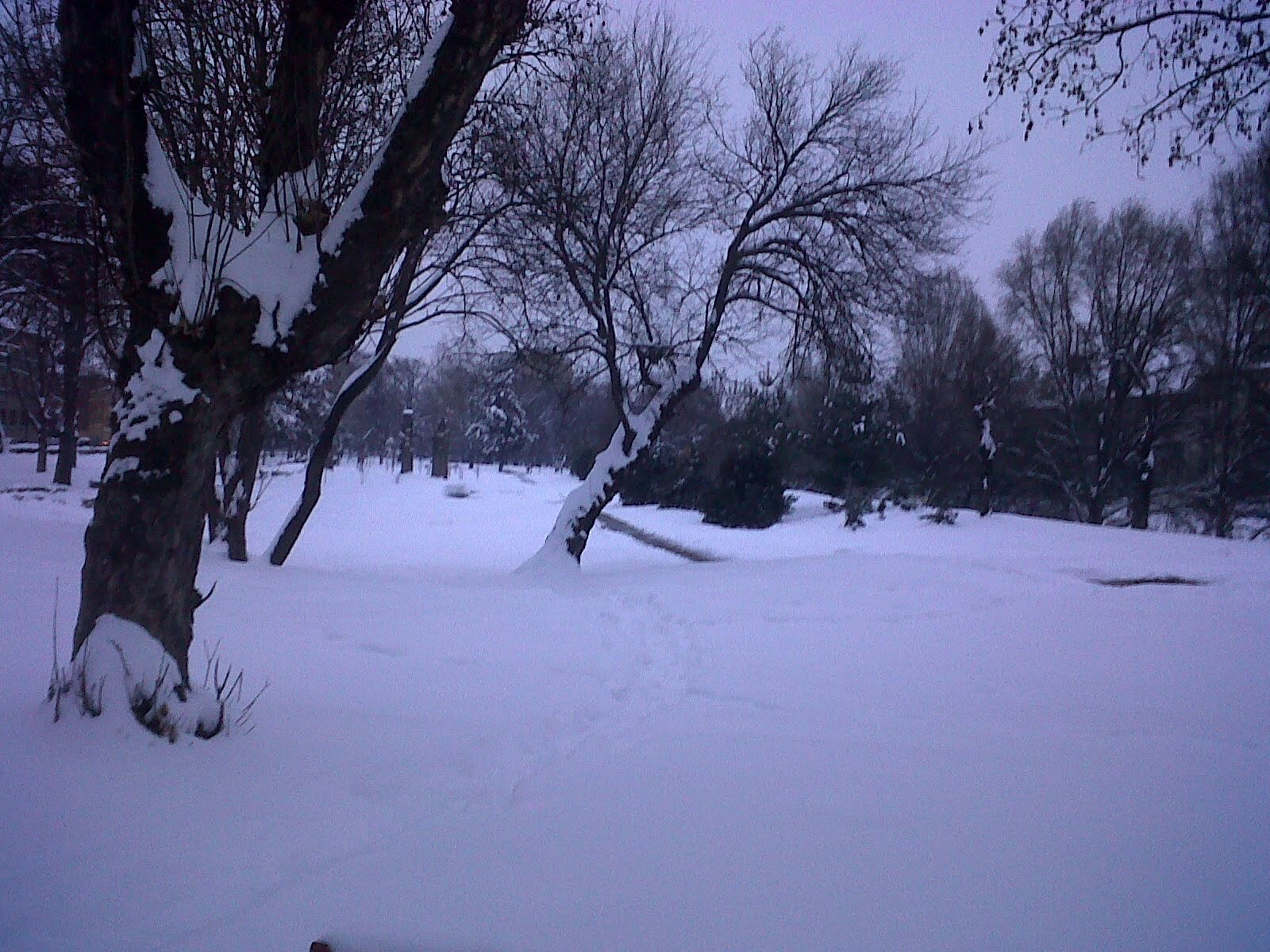
- Interactive map of Andrei Mocioni Park
- Location: Timișoara, Romania
- Coordinates: 45°45′26″N 21°14′28″E
- Area: 2.18 ha
- Created: 1950s
- Administered by: Timișoara City Hall
- Species: 37

Andrei Mocioni Park (Romanian: Parcul Andrei Mocioni), known until 2005 as ILSA Park or locally as Bega Riverside Park, is an urban park in the western Romanian city of Timișoara located on the northern bank of the Bega River, between the Decebalus Bridge and the Dacians' Bridge. With an area of 2.18 hectares, it is the easternmost of the riverfront parks.

== History ==
Between the two World Wars, buildings and institutions—such as the current Prefecture—were constructed on the vacant land along the right bank of the Bega Canal. Several villas also appeared along Andrei Mocioni Street, which borders the park to the west and north. In 1954, Splaiul Industria Lânii—now known as Andrei Mocioni Street—was developed, marking the beginning of the park's landscaping. During this period, alleys were laid out, flanked by hedges and two rows of sycamores running parallel to the embankment.

After the Municipal Police headquarters was built in 1965, the cliff alley was added, and acacia trees were planted around it. In front of the police station, additional landscaping introduced linden, Virginia junipers, and other species.

In the park's southern half, a large number of old black poplars had to be removed due to wind damage and stem decay, leaving the area noticeably bare. In the 2000s, efforts were made to revitalize this space by planting clusters of conifers near the cliff alley, along with willows and poplars on the embankment of the Bega Canal.

In 2024, the Freedom Alley (Romanian: Aleea Libertății) was arranged here by planting 11 oak trees in memory of the martyred heroes of the 1989 Revolution. The event was attended, among others, by Petre Roman, the first prime minister after the Revolution.

== Flora ==
In 2010 it contained 37 species of trees and shrubs, of which 15 were indigenous and 22 exotic, totaling 320 specimens. Of these, 302 were trees, with 256 deciduous and 46 coniferous, and 18 shrubs, with 13 coniferous and five deciduous.
