= Dan Păltinișanu Stadium (2025) =

Proposed stadium in Timișoara, Romania

- Stadionul „Dan Păltinișanu”
- Interactive map of Dan Păltinișanu Stadium
- Address: 1, Ștefan Covaci Street, Olimpia–Stadion; Timișoara, Timiș, Banat, Vest; Romania
- Coordinates: 45°44′25.65″N 21°14′39.1″E
- Owner: Timiș County Council
- Capacity: 32,150 seats
- Type: Soccer-specific stadium
- Surface: Grass
- Acreage: 28,800 m^{2} (7.1 acres)

Construction
- Cost: EUR 140 million
- Architect: Lucian Simion Arhitectură
- General contractors: National Investment Company; F.C. Politehnica Timișoara; Romania national football team UEFA; FIFA

The Dan Păltinișanu Stadium is a high-capacity multi-purpose stadium approved for construction in Timișoara, Timiș, Banat, Romania. It will replace the namesake stadium built in 1963. The new stadium will be the largest in Romania after the National Arena in Bucharest, respectively, the largest arena in the provinces and in the Danube–Criș–Mureș–Tisa Euroregion (DKMT).

The new arena in Timisoara is designed as a multipurpose venue. Its capacity and specifications meet UEFA requirements for matches such as the UEFA Conference League final and the UEFA Super Cup. It can also host music festivals, concerts and other events.

Furthermore, outside of football matches, the stadium will allow for the practice and hosting of high-performance competitions in numerous alternative sports disciplines, such as: rugby, rugby sevens, American football, cricket, lacrosse, field hockey, baseball, softball and other field sports, as well as the organization of demonstration competitions and special sporting events.

== History ==
=== Project ===
The idea of building a new stadium appeared in 2015, when Nicolae Robu, the former mayor of Timișoara, presented a master plan that provided for the restructuring of the area known as Olimpia by building an over 40,000-seat stadium, an Olympic-size swimming pool, a 16,000 seat multi-purpose sports hall, a hotel and a velodrome. The old Dan Păltinișanu Stadium was in an advanced state of degradation, some parts of the grandstands being closed to the public, and a possible renovation was not justified given the high costs. The master plan was presented at the 19th International Trade Fair for Property and Investment, held at Messe München Exhibition Center in October 2016.

The technical project of the future stadium began in January 2021, and the feasibility study was approved by the county councilors in June 2021. According to the study, the seating capacity will be 32,150, and the construction costs will amount to 140 million euros, of which 7 million will be borne by the Timiș County Council. It is the second most expensive stadium to be built in Romania after the National Arena in Bucharest. Moreover, it will be uncovered so that it can also host cultural or entertainment events. The project's deadline is 2028. The investment will be made by the National Investment Company, which will hand over the arena to the patrimony of Timiș County. Initially, Alin Nica, the president of the Timiș County Council, proposed the construction of an athletics track around the stadium, but the idea was quickly rejected by the representatives of the city's football galleries.

The arena will be able to host UEFA Champions League and UEFA Europa League matches and will be eligible to host a UEFA Conference League final and the UEFA Super Cup, as well as competitions organized by the Romanian Football Federation.

According to the RFF, the stadium will be of category 4 – international competition level.

=== Demolition ===
The demolition of the old stadium is estimated at 6 million euros and was approved by county councilors in June 2023. In turn, the government issued the demolition decision in August 2024. The actual demolition began in February 2025. Prior to this, thousands of seats were dismantled and distributed to other football fields in Timiș County. The floodlighting system and turnstiles from the demolished stadium were relocated to the arena in Reșița.

=== Construction ===
Following the swearing in of the Bolojan cabinet in the summer of 2025, the government has contemplated the financial commitment towards the project, evaluating the fiscal viability of funding within the government's broader rebalancing of public sectors expenditures. Subsequently, the President of the County Council, Alfred Simonis, announced that he had received assurances from Bucharest that the Dan Păltinișanu Stadium would not be affected by the budgetary cuts.

In July 2024, the National Investment Company initially designated Con-A Operations as the winning bidder for the construction of the new stadium. This decision was subsequently challenged in court by the consortium ranked second—led by Concelex, in partnership with Construcții Erbașu, Concelex Engineering, and Terra Gaz Construct—which ultimately prevailed. Concelex constructed the new Steaua Stadium in Bucharest (inaugurated in 2021), as well as the new terminal of Timișoara International Airport. Meanwhile, Construcții Erbașu delivered, in Timișoara, the new Bega Maternity Hospital and the Burn Center.

== See also ==
- Dan Păltinișanu Stadium (1963)
- List of football stadiums in Romania
- List of European stadia by capacity
- List of future stadiums
