= Lutheran Church, Timișoara =

Church in Timișoara, Romania

Lutheran Church
- Biserica Luterană (Romanian); Lutherkirche (German)
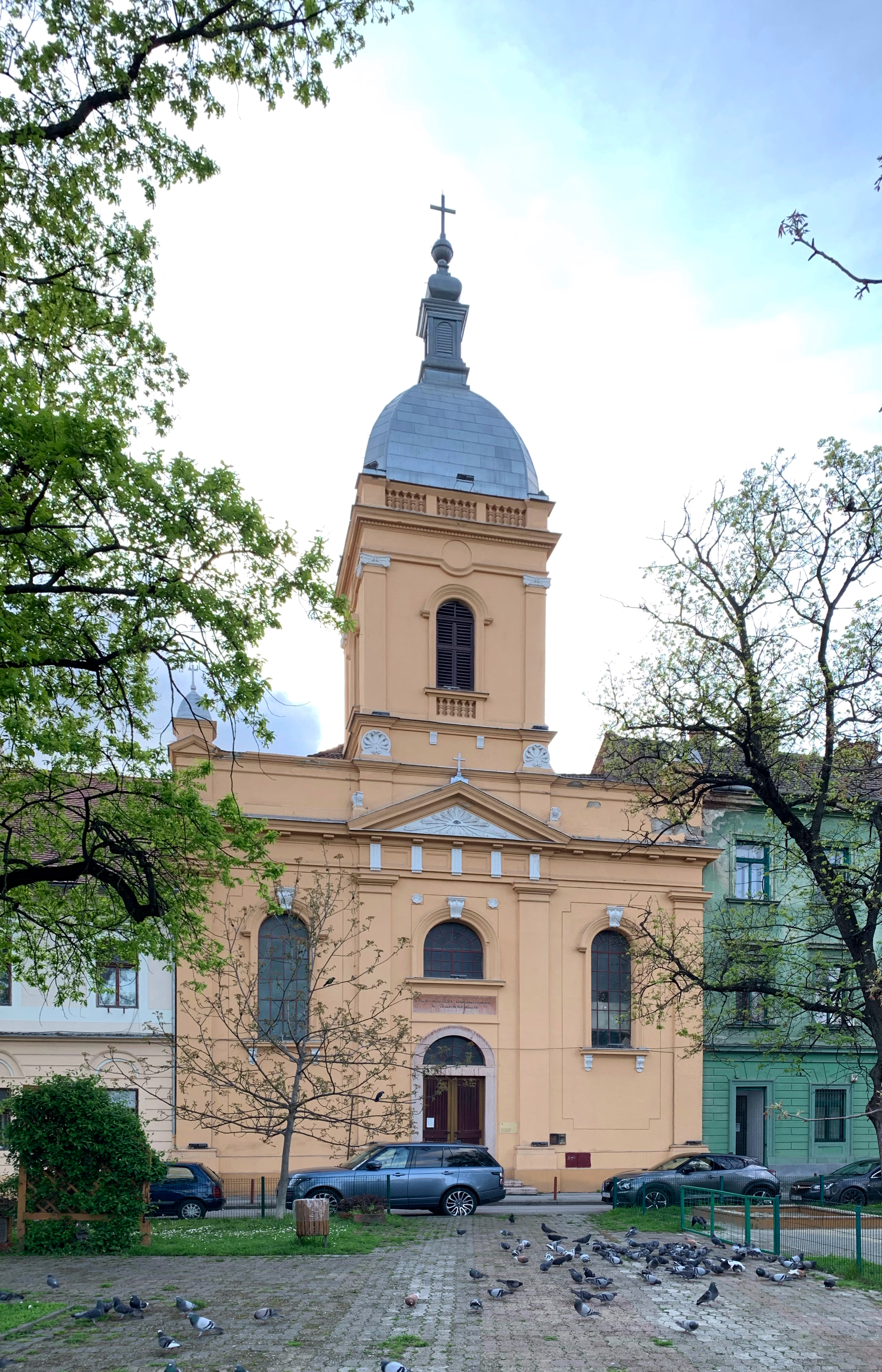

Religion
- Affiliation: Lutheran
- Ecclesiastical or organizational status: Evangelical Lutheran Church of Romania
- Year consecrated: 1839
- Status: Active

Location
- Location: Ion I. C. Brătianu Square, Timișoara
- Interactive map of Lutheran Church
- Coordinates: 45°45′28″N 21°13′53″E

Architecture
- Architect: Antal Schmidt
- Style: Neoclassical
- Groundbreaking: 1837
- Completed: 1839

The Lutheran Church (Romanian: Biserica Luterană; German: Lutherkirche) is a Lutheran church in the Cetate district of Timișoara. It is the only Lutheran church in Timișoara, the Lutheran community here numbering about 400 people and being composed of Germans, Hungarians, Slovaks and Romanians. The religious service is officiated in all four languages. Nowadays, the church occasionally hosts baroque music concerts, choral performances, classical music concerts or organ concerts.

== History ==
The first Lutheran service in Timișoara was held in 1795. Since the Lutheran community did not have a church, this initially took place in various municipal institutions. The erection of a Lutheran church in Timișoara was possible only after Emperor Joseph II issued the Toleranzpatent of 13 October 1781. In 1824 the United Protestant Community (Romanian: Comunitatea Protestantă Unită) was founded and the building of the church was decided. The church was built between 1837 and 1839, according to the project of the architect Antal Schmidt, in neoclassical style. The Doric pilasters on two levels of the facade, the triangular pediment, as well as the Ionic pilasters of the tower stand out. The church was consecrated on 27 October 1839. At the consecration, the choir of the Roman Catholic Cathedral provided the musical accompaniment of the ceremony, and the Cathedral Chapter donated a new, own chalice for the new Protestant church. In 1890 the association split into Evangelical and Reformed faiths. The church was retrofitted with a tower in 1901, in which three bronze bells were installed in 1903.

On one side of the church is the vicarage and on the other is a three-storey building originally intended as a Lutheran school. This had functioned as a boys' school since 1825, into which a girls' school was integrated in 1859. In 1869 the Lutheran school was closed because the city administration established municipal schools and withdrew the subsidies from the Lutheran Church.

The church, located in Ion I. C. Brătianu Square, is built on a plot of land on which there were no constructions until 1831. Only in that year the square was parceled out and sold for construction. The church is flanked by constructions erected after that year.
