= Victor Popescu Military Hospital =

Victor Popescu Military Emergency Clinical Hospital
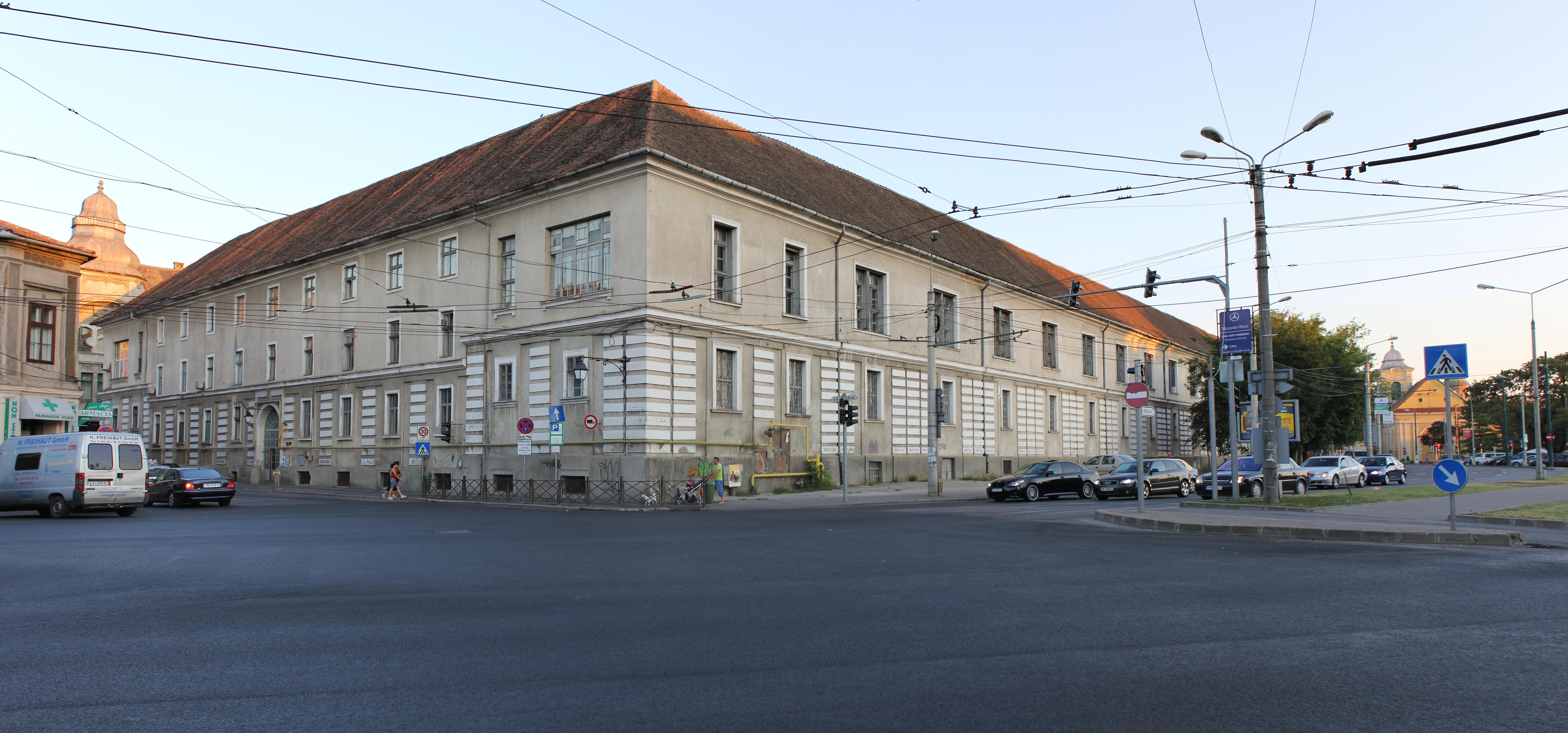

Geography
- Location: Timișoara, Romania
- Coordinates: 45°45′24″N 21°13′31″E

Organisation
- Type: Military

Services
- Emergency department: Yes
- Beds: 175

History
- Construction started: 1764
- Opened: 1766

Links
- Website: www.smutm.ro

Victor Popescu Military Emergency Clinical Hospital (Romanian: Spitalul Clinic Militar de Urgență „Victor Popescu”) is a public hospital with a military profile in Timișoara, Romania. On 5 February 1847, the first general anesthesia with ether in what is now Romania was carried out here, just 112 days after the first such procedure was performed globally.

It offers specialized medical care to active, reserve, or retired military personnel, war veterans, or veterans from conflict zones, along with their families, from the military units and formations assigned to the counties of Arad, Bihor, Caraș-Severin, and Timiș.

== History ==
=== Habsburg period ===
In 1753, at the time when the city was part of the Kingdom of Hungary under the rule of the Habsburg monarchy, civil administration was separated from the military administration, which had previously overseen and been responsible for all activities in the province. As a result, on 17 January 1753, the commander of the Timișoara Fortress submitted a report to the Court Council of War, responding to the order to establish a garrison hospital in Timișoara.

Once all the necessary steps were taken to determine the location for the building, and the estimate and plan had been prepared, the commander of the Fortress requested that the central authority speed up the approval of the documents. This would allow construction to begin promptly, with the foundation and structure completed up to the roof during the summer, and the building finished the following year. By 1754, just one year after the decision to build the hospital, it was completed up to the ground floor.

From 1790 onwards, the hospital was struggling with financial problems. In 1805, many medicines were discontinued or replaced by substitutes. The situation was similar with the food in the hospital kitchen. In 1807, when wheat flour was no longer available, it was replaced by oat flour. Vegetables were grown in the barracks yard and along the fortress wall in order to be able to supply the kitchens with vegetables. In addition, there were inadequate hygienic conditions. The mortality rate in the hospital was 2.5%. In 1820, 40 of 1,649 patients died in the hospital.

In March 1815, the general command of Banat sought approval for expanding the hospital in Timișoara. A year later, the emperor responded with specific instructions to "ease finances," which included reusing wood from the old roof to cover the first floor (a method also used in other provinces like Bohemia and Poland) and employing craftsmen and laborers from the military. Additionally, the doctors at the hospital were required to attend advanced training courses at the Faculty of Medicine in Vienna.

A significant moment in the hospital's history occurred on 5 February 1847, when the first ether anesthesia was performed on the current territory of Romania. This took place just 112 days after the world's first such procedure in Boston. The procedure was carried out by Mathias Musil, with assistance from Chief Doctor Johann Siehs, who created an ether inhalation device based on designs from the London Medical Gazette. The patient was soldier Nicolae Muntean. At that time, the hospital was operating at full capacity, functioning as a true field hospital. Later, with the frontlines moved, its operations transitioned to that of an inland medical facility.

=== Post-war period ===
In August 1944, the military hospital was converted into a hospital of the 517th Company. Until 1945, the military hospital also had a department for wounded prisoners of war. Between 1948 and 1958, a third of the hospital was occupied by a Soviet air defense company. In 1959, the military hospital had a capacity of 300 beds.

From 1969 to 1973, the first university clinic for internal medicine and the first surgical university clinic in Timișoara were established in the military hospital under the direction of Ana Aslan and Ion Făgărășanu. Here, Pius Brînzeu laid the foundation for vascular surgery.

=== Hospital building ===
The hospital building was constructed as a single floor structure between 1764 and 1766, with additional floors added between 1817 and 1818. After being bombed in 1849, it was renovated in 1894, during which most of its decorative elements, which defined its stylistic features, were removed. Only the robust, classicist-designed bossages, which rhythmically accentuate the facades, remain. The building is large, occupying an entire block bordered by Coriolan Brediceanu, Gheorghe Dima, Gheorghe Lazăr, and Mărășești streets, and includes three interconnected interior courtyards with passageways beneath the arches.
