= Ion Creangă Children's Park =

Children's park in Timișoara, Romania

- Parcul Copiilor „Ion Creangă”
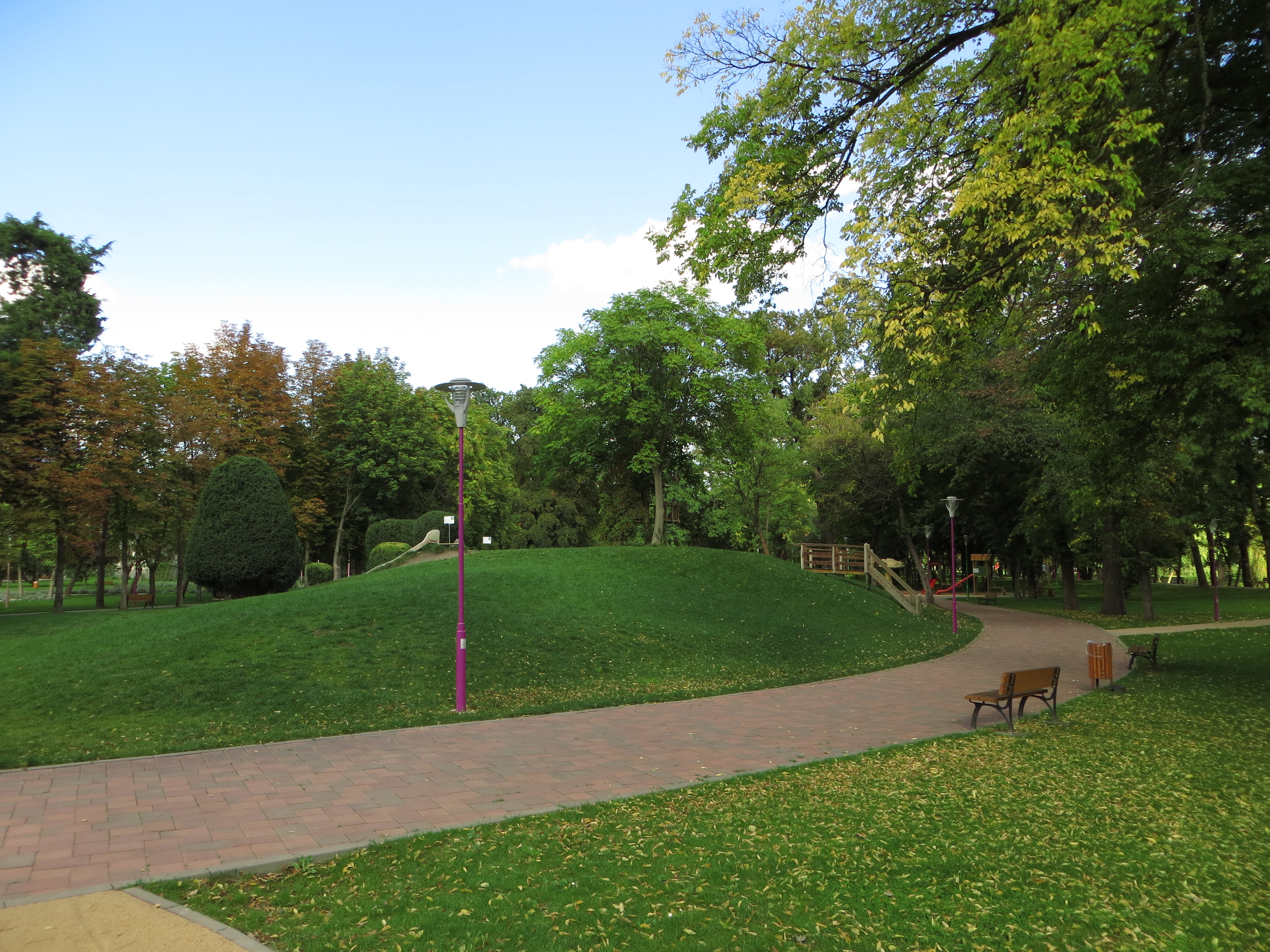
- Entrance from Michelangelo Boulevard
- Interactive map of Ion Creangă Children's Park
- Type: Children's park
- Location: Timișoara, Romania
- Coordinates: 45°45′08″N 21°14′11″E
- Area: 6.64 ha
- Etymology: Ion Creangă
- Administrator: Timișoara City Hall
- Species: 110
- Public transit: Bus line E8; Tram lines 1, 2, 4, 10

Ion Creangă Children's Park (Romanian: Parcul Copiilor „Ion Creangă”) is a children's park in Timișoara that bears the name of Romanian children's author Ion Creangă.

== Location ==
The park is located between the Bega Canal, the Michelangelo overpass and bridge, the ensemble of historical buildings on Constantin Diaconovici Loga Boulevard and Martir Leontina Bânciu Street. The Children's Park has two main entrances, the first one on Michelangelo Boulevard, and the second one on the 1989 Romanian Revolution Boulevard.

== History ==
The development of the park began in 1858, in parallel with that of Coronini Park (present-day Queen Marie Park); the works were completed 33 years later, in 1891, and the new park was named Franz Joseph Park. The idea of this park started from the city council, which, around the preparation of the Agro-Industrial Exhibition in Southern Hungary (1891), saw an excellent possibility for the arrangement of the right bank of the Bega River. The park kept its original name until 1919, when it was renamed Mihai Eminescu Park. For a very short period of time, between 1941 and 1945, the western part of the park was included in the Botanical Garden, established ad hoc, as a research base of the Botanical Institute of Cluj, which operated in the building of the Faculty of Hydrotechnics in Roses Park. Between 1945 and 1955, when Russian military units were stationed here and in Roses Park, the park was abandoned and defaced. It was transformed into a children's park in 1986, according to a project by architect Mihai Donici. At that time it was called Pioneers' Park (Romanian: Parcul Pionierilor).

The Children's Park was closed to the public in 2004, when following an accident due to old and outdated installations, a child lost his life. Later, following an investment of almost 2 million euros, the park was transformed and redeveloped. It was reopened in 2012 on Children's Day.

== Flora ==
Most of the current vegetation is represented by secular oaks, spruces, pines and other deciduous species. The presence of Ginkgo biloba specimens and softwood trees – willows, locusts, lindens, etc. Among the ornamental and decorative plants can be found: roses, lavenders, azaleas, hibiscus, daffodils, chrysanthemums, violets, begonias, sages, etc.

== Gallery ==
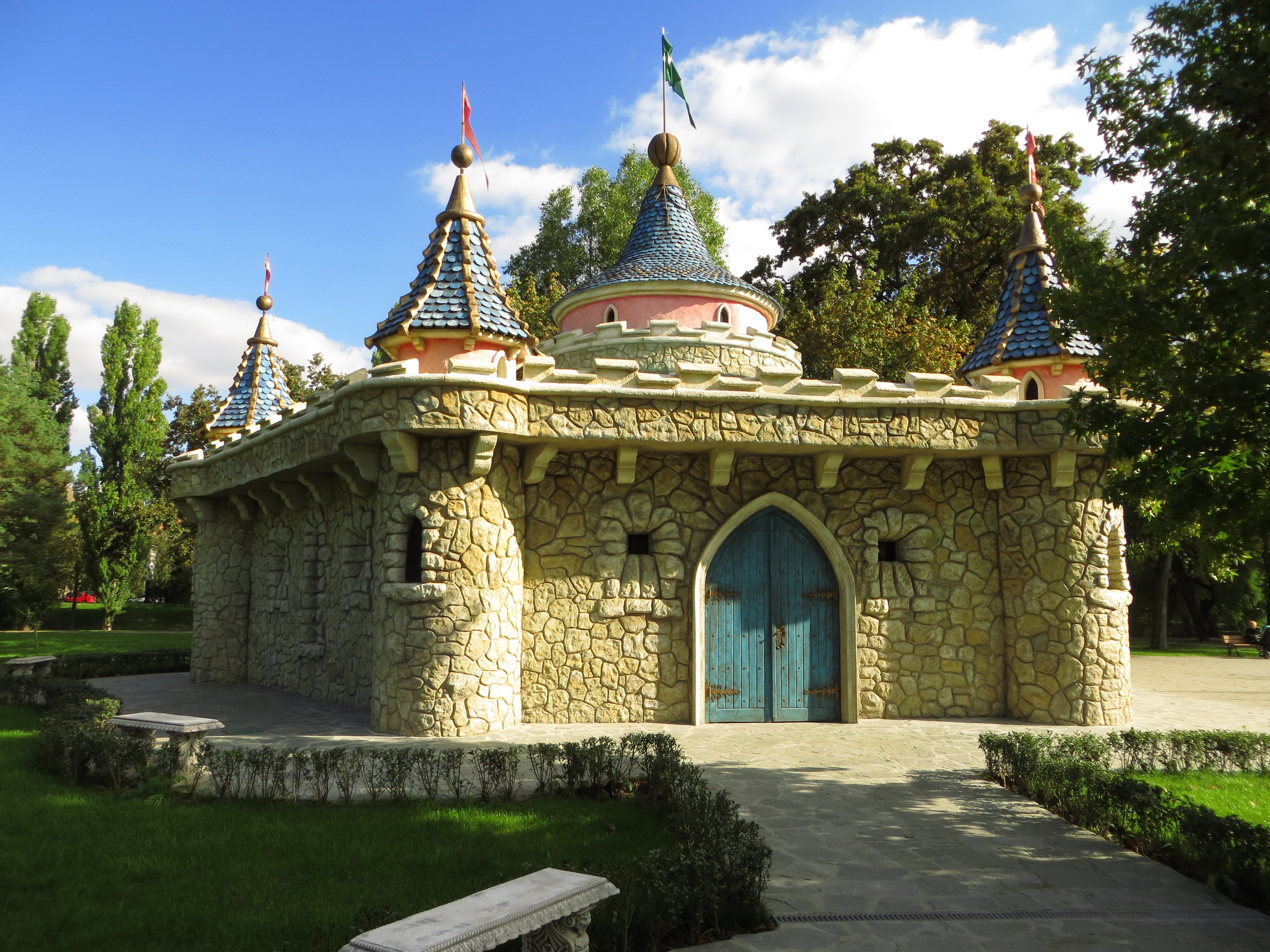
Miniature replica of Princess Aurora's castle at Disneyland Paris

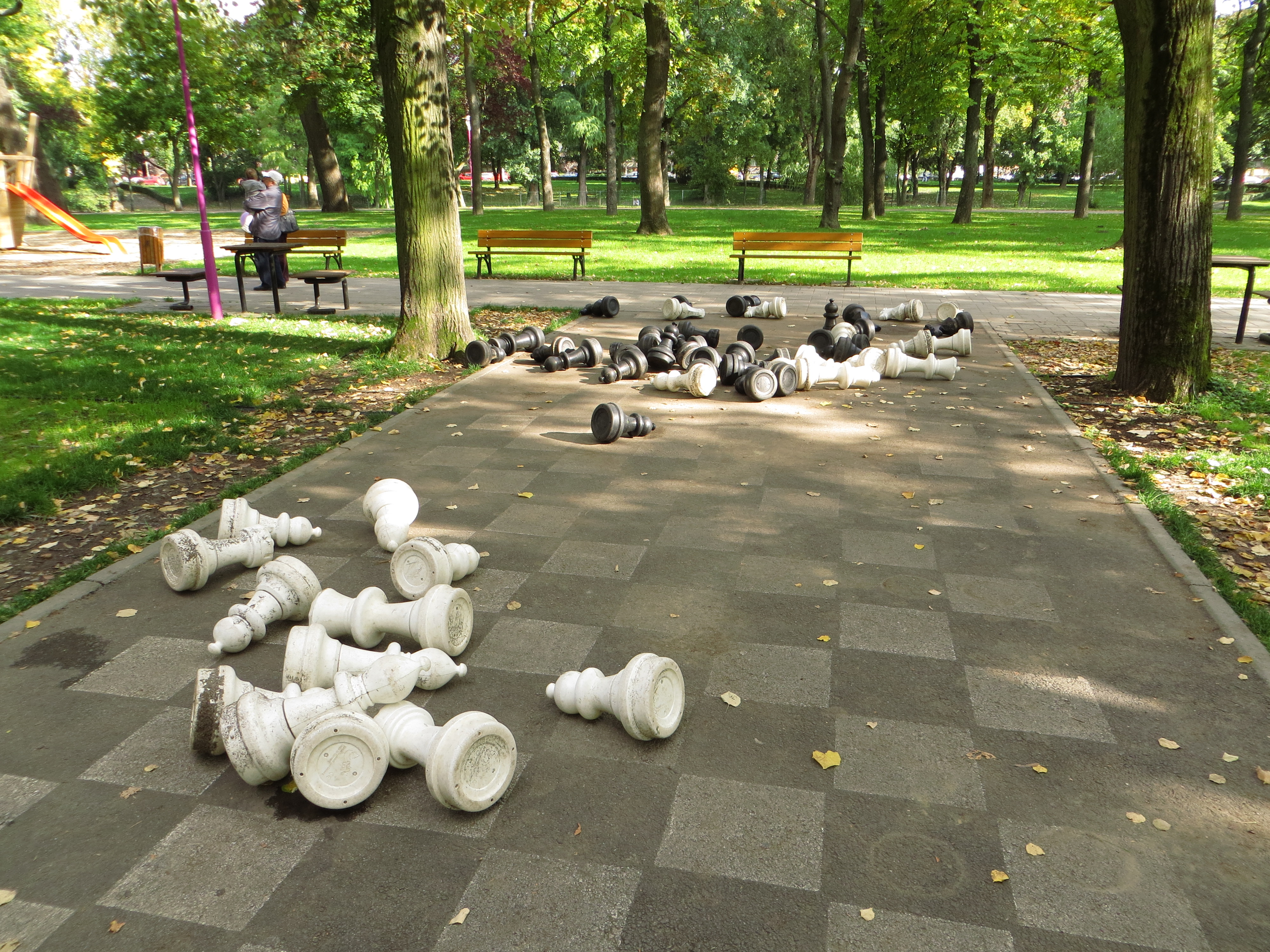
Outdoor chess board

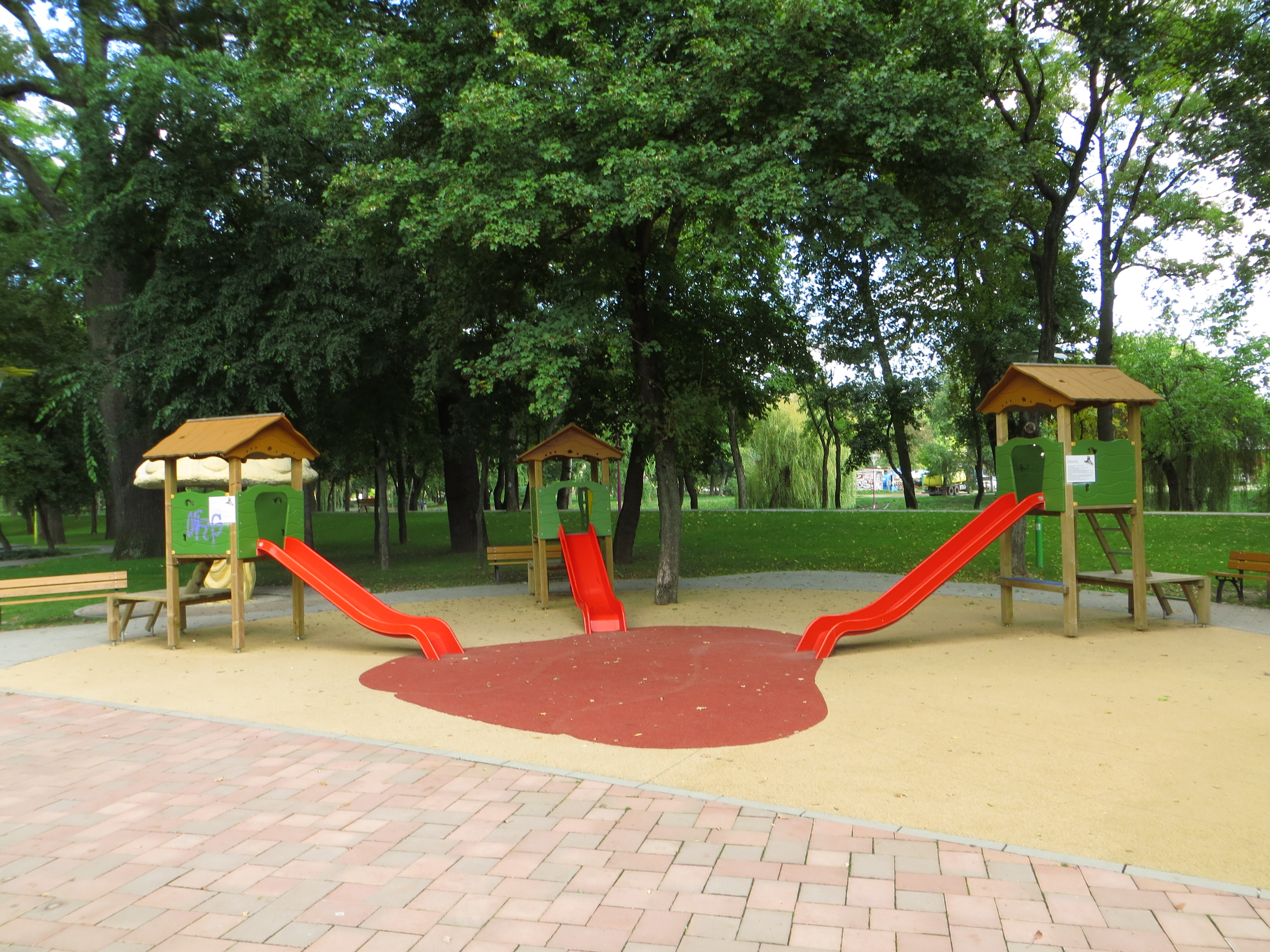
Slides in Ion Creangă Children's Park

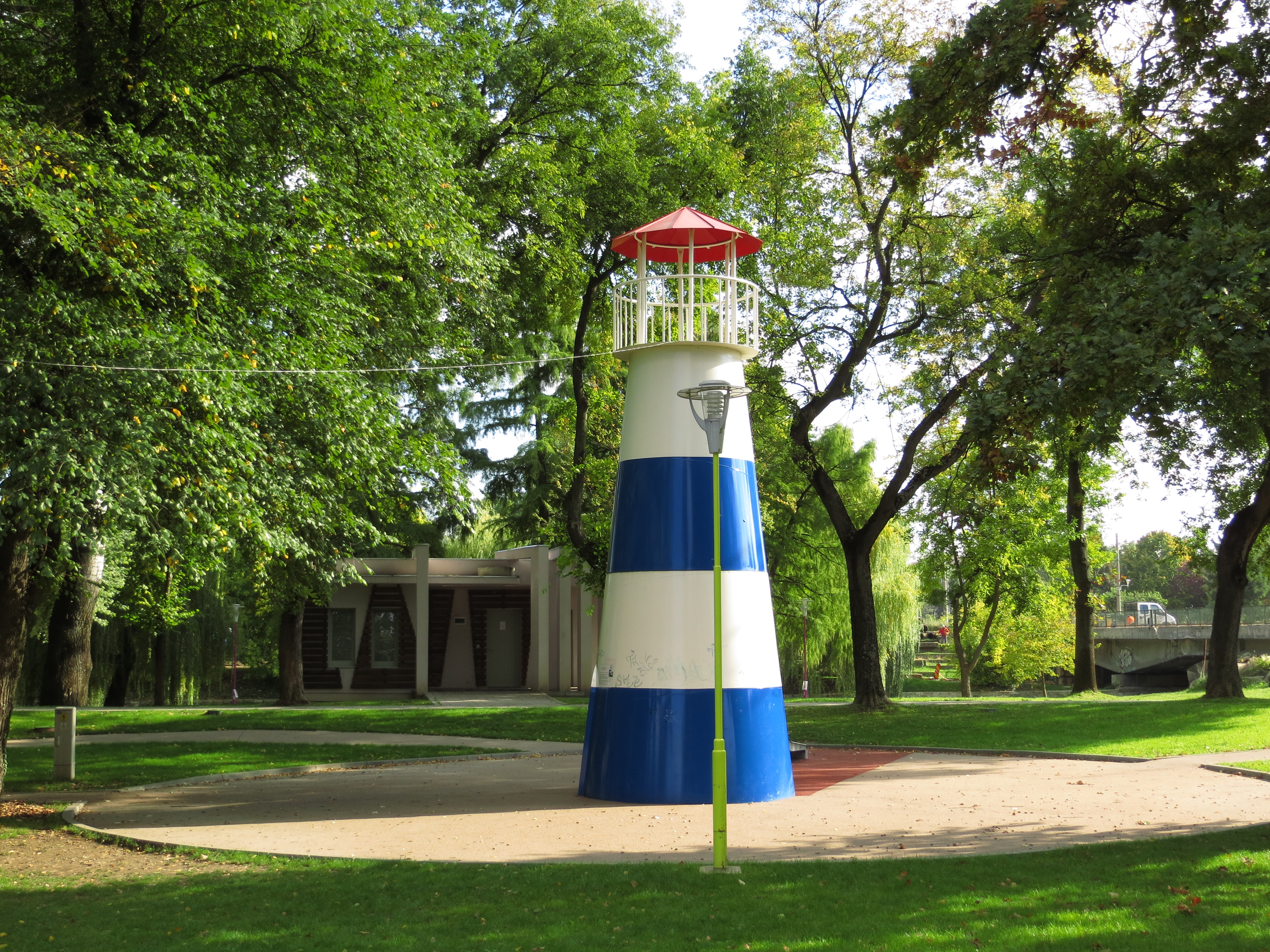
The lighthouse
