= Administrative Palace, Timișoara =

Administrative Palace
- Palatul Administrativ
- Interactive map of the Administrative Palace area
- Alternative names: Prefecture Palace

General information
- Architectural style: Neoclassical
- Location: 17 1989 Revolution Boulevard, Timișoara, Romania
- Coordinates: 45°45′21″N 21°14′15″E
- Construction started: 1938
- Completed: 1943
- Operator: Timiș County Council

Technical details
- Floor count: 3

Design and construction
- Architects: Victor Vlad; Corneliu Liuba
- Main contractor: Constantin Purcariu

The Administrative Palace (Romanian: Palatul Administrativ) is a public building located at 17 1989 Revolution Boulevard, Timișoara, Romania. It currently serves as the seat of the Timiș County Council and the Timiș County Prefecture, which is why it is sometimes called the Prefecture Palace (Romanian: Palatul Prefecturii). The building was the residence of the royal resident responsible for the administration of the Timiș Region (Timiș-Torontal, Arad, Caraș-Severin and Hunedoara counties), created in 1938, then the seat of the Timiș-Torontal County Prefecture.

== History ==
On the site where the current building is located, the Imbroane family, which played a prominent role in the life of the city, envisioned the construction of a girls' school. According to the plans drawn up by architect Mathias Hubert, it was to have five floors and a gym, right where the prefect's office is today. The works, started in 1933, were however stopped due to the difficulties caused by the economic crisis and the completion of the construction was no longer possible according to the original project.

With the establishment of the Timiș Region and the appointment of the royal resident at the head of this region, the problem arose of finding a suitable headquarters for it, thus the solution of changing the destination of this building, from a school to an administrative palace, was reached. However, being a school building, several changes were necessary in the entire structure of the building.

The redesign of the building, in order to be functional as an administrative headquarters, was done by architect Victor Vlad, university professor at the Timișoara Polytechnic, in collaboration with architect Corneliu Liuba. Works started in 1938 and ended in the early 1940s. As it appears today, the building of the Administrative Palace is a monumental construction in modern style. On the outside, however, the classic elements are dominant, in a realization with modern materials. The building impresses with its proportions, volume and decorative elements. Classic columns with Corinthian capitals decorate the facade, where the spindle is finished in terrasite, the rest being made in artificial stone.

Over time, the building underwent a series of interior changes by re-compartmentalizing spaces and redistributing functions, maintaining the administrative profile. During 1968–1989, the building was also used by the Timiș County Committee of the Romanian Communist Party and the Union of Communist Youth, the County Union of Agricultural Production Cooperatives and the Patriotic Guards.

Currently, the building is used as the headquarters for the Timiș County Council and the Timiș County Prefect, being the public property of Timiș County and administered by the Timiș County Council. In 2010, the complex was expanded along its northern side with a new building covering 3,167 square metres.
