= Tipografilor =

Coordinates: 45.760428°N 21.2154149°E

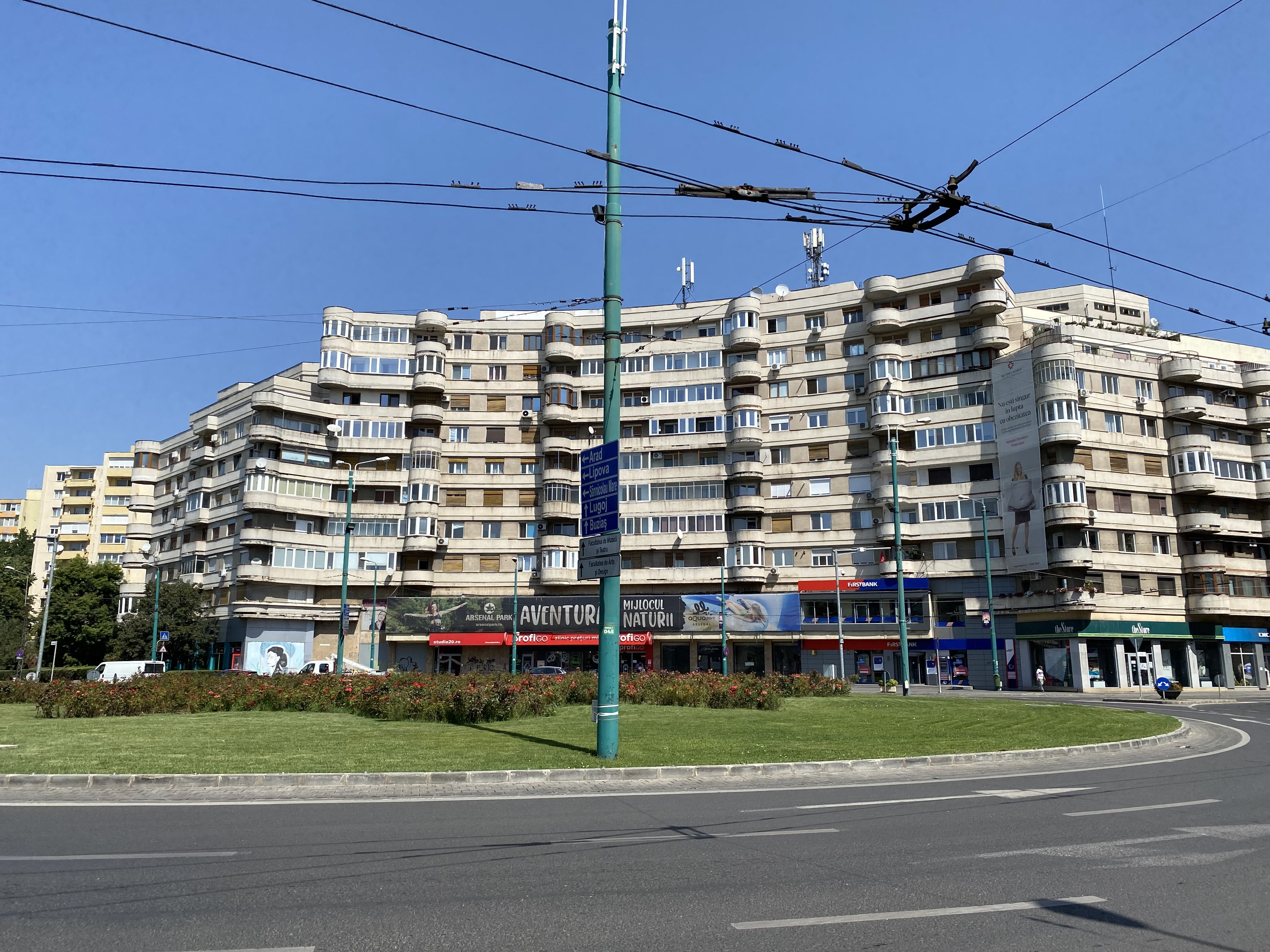
Socialist brutalist complex (arch. Gheorghe Gîrleanu) in Mărăști Square

Tipografilor is a district of Timișoara. It is bounded by Take Ionescu Boulevard to the south, Popa Șapcă Street to the west, CFR Line 900 to the north and Enric Baader Street to the east.

It was developed on the vacant lands in the vicinity and inside the interwar villa district, in close relation with the location of the printing house that also gave the name of the current Take Ionescu Boulevard. Most of the over 1,000 employees of the Banat Printing Company lived here. The company went bankrupt after 1989. The building of the former printing house was demolished in 2019; a mixed-use development with a 17-storey tower will be built in its place.
