= Dicasterial Palace =

- Palatul Dicasterial
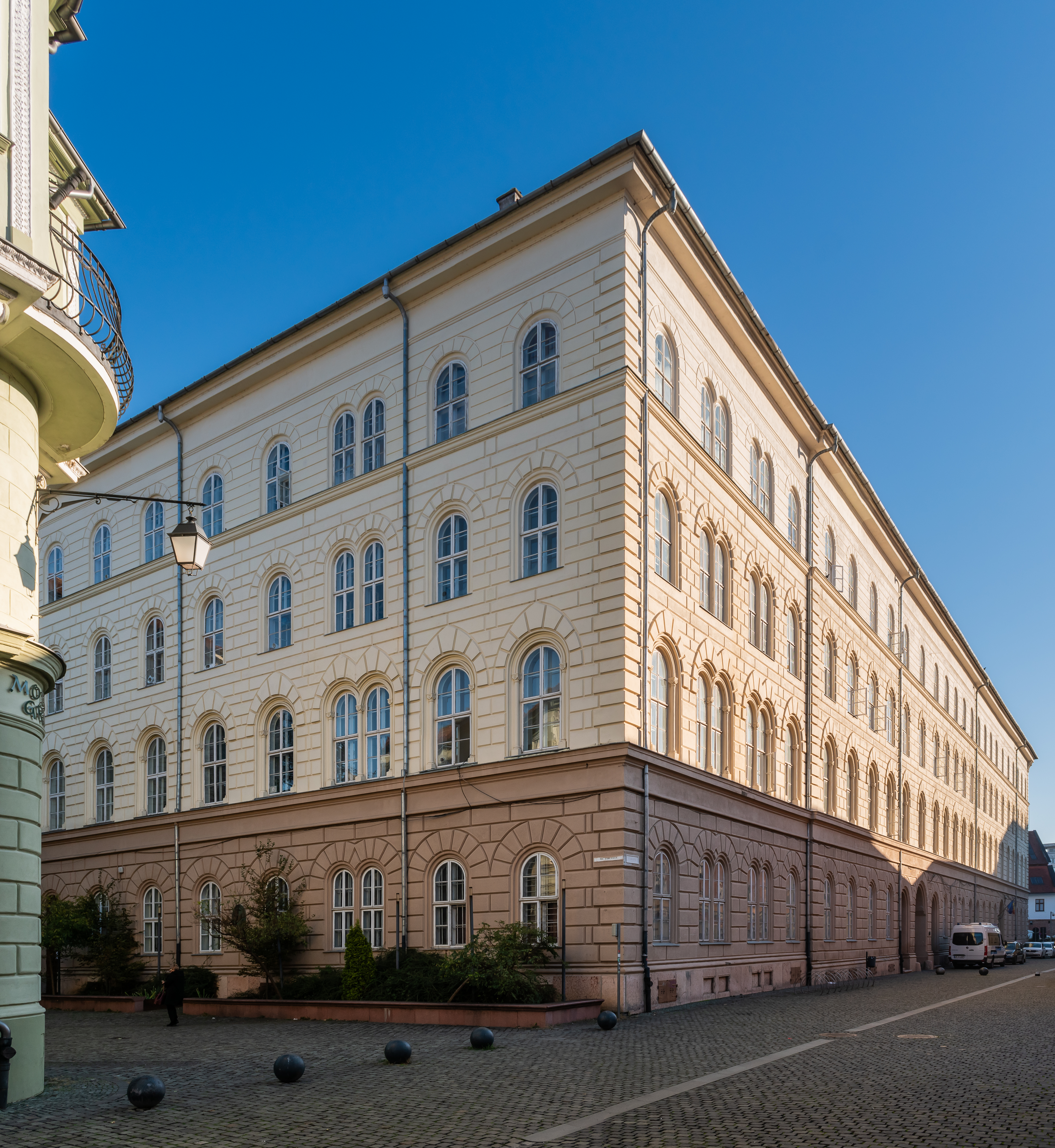
- Interactive map of the Dicasterial Palace area

General information
- Architectural style: Historicist
- Location: Timișoara, Romania
- Coordinates: 45°45′24″N 21°13′53″E
- Construction started: 1855
- Completed: 1860

Technical details
- Floor count: 4
- Grounds: 23,500 m^{2}

The Dicasterial Palace (Romanian: Palatul Dicasterial) is a historical monument in Timișoara, Romania, which serves today as the headquarters of the local court, tribunal and court of appeal.

== History ==
In 1727, there was a barracks on this site, then called the Chamber Administration House, where the Catholic bishop also lived in 1752. Being built before the drawing of the new rectangular system of streets, this one-story building was "rotated" with respect to the network of streets in Cetate. Between 1754 and 1758, the Flour Warehouse was added to the building.

In today's form, the Dicasterial Palace was built between 1855 and 1860, being intended for the Parliament of the Voivodeship of Serbia and Banat of Temeschwar. This was proclaimed in 1849 for the areas of Syrmia, Banat, Bačka and Baranya as a response to the Hungarian uprising against the Austrian imperial family in the revolution of 1848–1849. In 1860, however, the Voivodeship of Serbia and Banat of Temeschwar was dissolved and the political order before 1848 was restored. The Cigarette Factory also operated in the building until the fire of 1880. In 1898, the building housed, among other institutions, the Post and Telegraph Office.

== Architecture ==
The palace, built in an historicist style (using ornamental elements from the plastic language of the early Tuscan Renaissance), was for a long time the largest building in Timișoara, being built on an area of about 23,500 m^{2}. The building is inspired by the Renaissance palaces of Florence: Strozzi, Medici or Pitti. Through its huge proportions and dimensions, it mirrors the neo-absolutist state, established after the defeat of the Hungarian Revolution. The palace was built on three levels, initially having 273 offices, 34 servants' rooms, 34 kitchens, 65 cellars, 27 storerooms, these being grouped around three inner courtyards. The facades are structured in horizontal registers, punctuated only by the row of windows. The ornaments on the windows are reduced to the colonnettes flanking the windows on the first floor.
