= Girocului =

District of Timișoara, Romania

Coordinates: 45.7324563°N 21.2325202°E

Girocului, also known as Martirilor, is a district in southern Timișoara. It was built between 1970 and 1985, as a consequence of the urban systematization carried out by the Communist Party, which aimed at increasing the population of Timișoara. Its name comes from the village (Giroc) to which the road that crosses it is heading. In fact, as a result of the urban development over the past two decades, Giroc has virtually become a suburb of Timișoara.

Calea Martirilor (then Calea Girocului) constitutes a significant site in the collective memory of the 1989 Revolution. On 17 and 18 December 1989, security forces opened fire on protesters along this thoroughfare, resulting in numerous deaths and injuries. These events formed part of the implementation of the military operation codenamed "Radu cel Frumos", which was aimed at suppressing the anti-communist demonstrations in Timișoara.

== Transport ==
Public transport consists of permanent connections with the city center (lines 15, E2 and E3) and other neighboring districts (lines 7 and 9).
