= Soarelui, Timișoara =

District of south-eastern Timișoara, Romania

Coordinates: 45.7357784°N 21.2304675°E

Soarelui is a district in southeastern Timișoara. In terms of surface area, it is one of the smallest districts of the city. It was built around 1985, being among the last working-class neighborhoods built by the communist regime in Timișoara. Before that year, there were no buildings on these lands, only agricultural plots or pastures. Most of the inhabitants were employed in the factories on the Buziașului industrial platform. Soarelui is the district with one of the highest standard of living in Timișoara and is perceived as one of the safest places in the city.
