= Kuncz =

District of Timișoara, Romania

Coordinates: 45.7405553°N 21.2563776°E

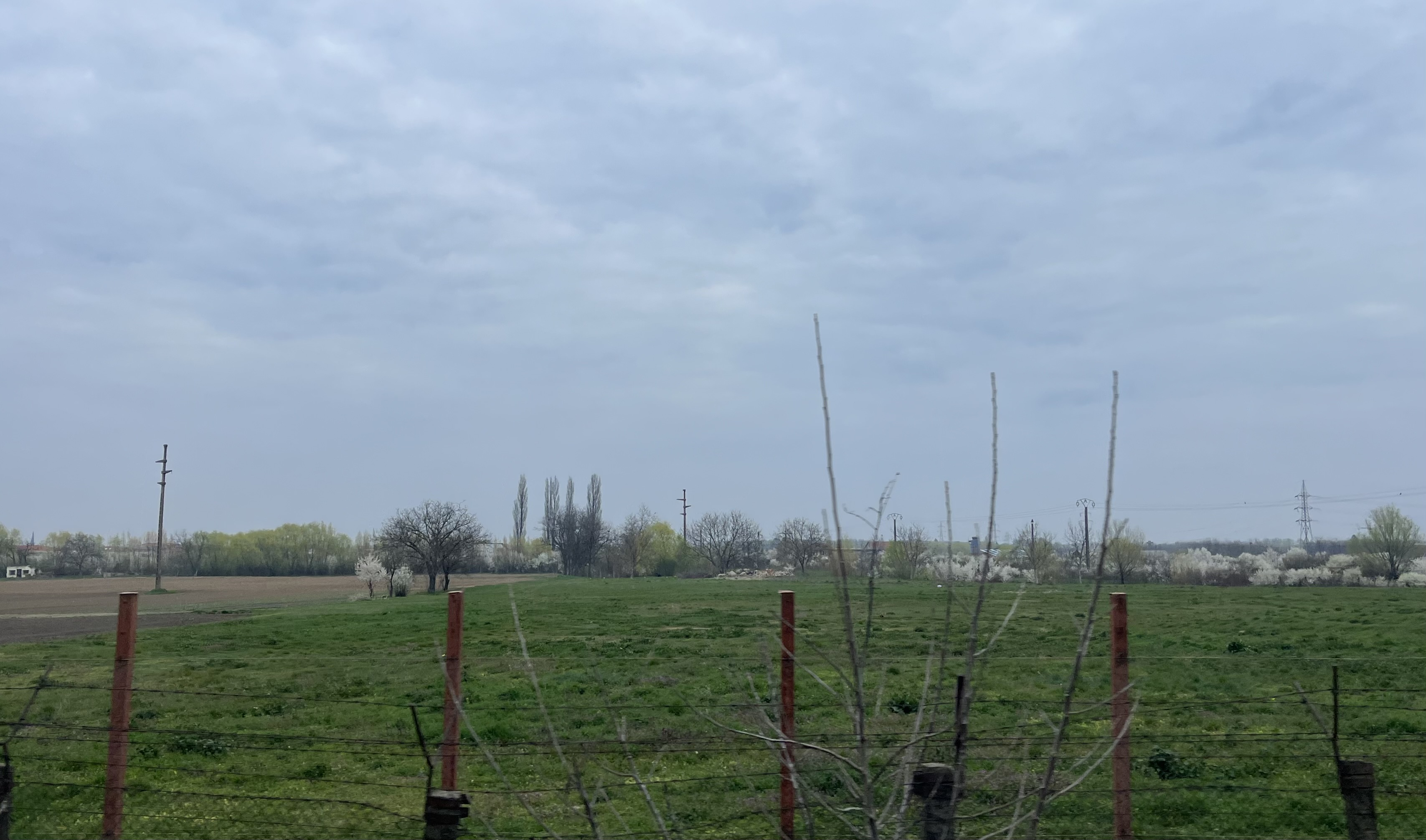
Kuncz

Kuncz (deprecated: Colonia Kunz; Hungarian: Kunztelep; German: Kunz Kolonie) is a district in eastern Timișoara. Kuncz is a former estate of industrialist József Kuncz (1823–1895), who built several factories and barracks for workers here. Its rural appearance has been preserved over time. Kuncz is noted for its large Roma population.

== History ==
In the 19th century, Kuncz owned an area of 15.3 hectares of land on the outskirts of the city. He had a tile and brick factory, and in order to increase production, he brought several Roma people to the area to work for him. In exchange for their work, Kuncz provided them with more land so that they could build their homes. The houses were erected illegally, without any authorization or sale-purchase document. The factory was closed in 1945, but the former workers remained in the houses built here.

In the 20th century, the entire land was nationalized, and after the communist period, no one appeared to claim the land. Thus, in 2004 it passed from the ownership of the Romanian state to the ownership of the Timișoara City Hall.

The houses of the Kuncz district generally presented a simple and modest appearance, typical of working-class districts in this part of Europe. The houses built during the time of József Kuncz still exist, and over a hundred Roma families live there. They speak Hungarian and Romanian and most of them are newcomers to Timișoara, knowing Romani as well.
