= Prințul Turcesc–Lunei =

District of Timișoara

Coordinates: 45°45′7″N 21°15′25″E

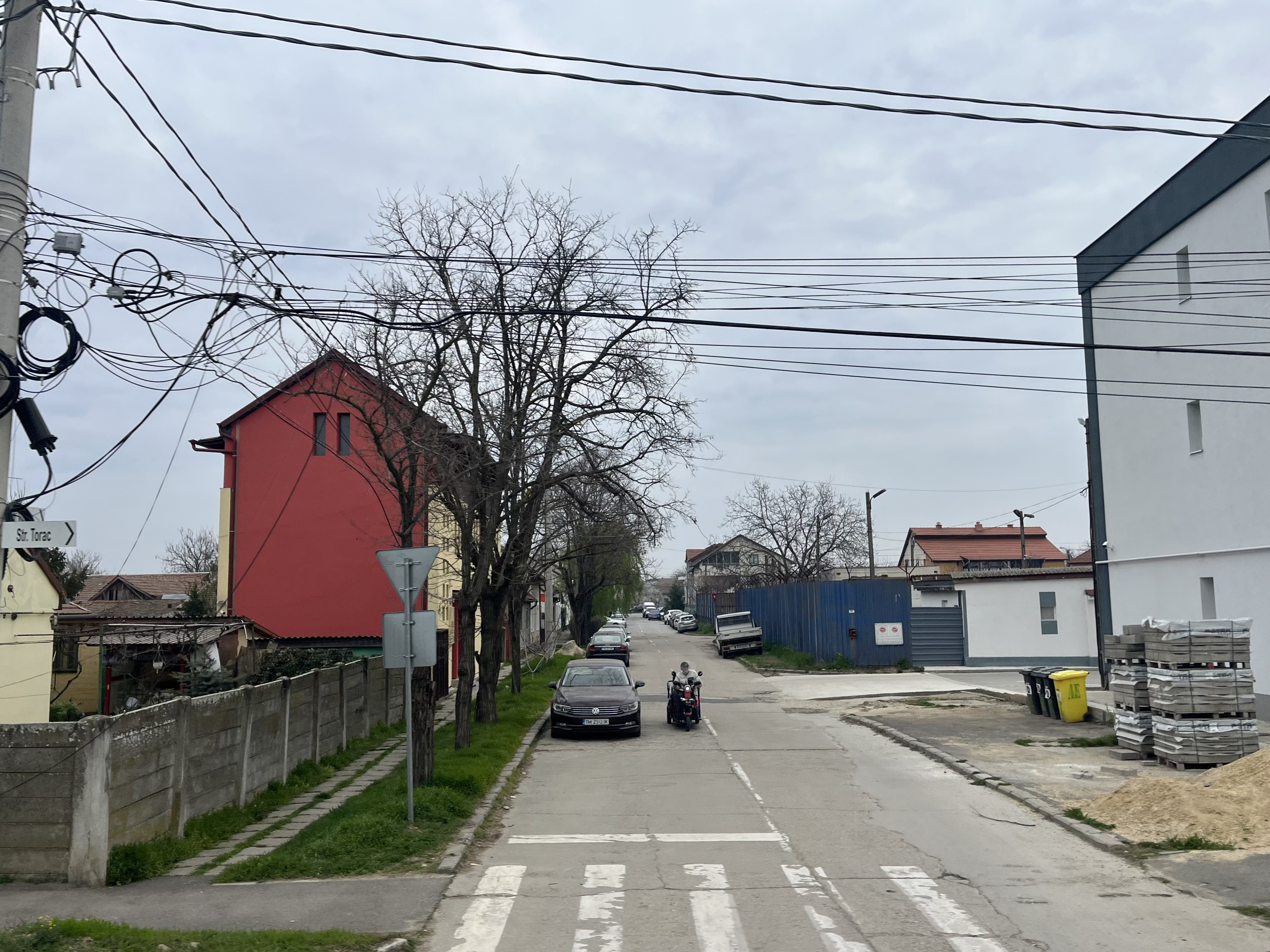
Prințul Turcesc–Lunei

Prințul Turcesc–Lunei is a district of Timișoara. The area was once renowned for its craft fairs. It also hosted a restaurant called "Împăratul Turcesc" (Turkish Emperor), later renamed "Prințul Turcesc" (Turkish Prince), which served as a gathering place for Ottoman craftsmen from south of the Danube. The restaurant's name eventually inspired the name of the district. The district underwent significant architectural changes during the final years of Ceaușescu's rule, leaving behind a contrasting mix of apartment blocks and old houses.
