= Telegrafului =

Coordinates: 45°46′2″N 21°15′9″E

Telegrafului is a district of Timișoara. It is a district consisting mainly of houses and is named after the main street that crosses it from west to east; it is probably related to the first telegraph lines introduced in Timișoara in the 19th century. During the Austro-Hungarian administration, the street was called Telegrafengasse (in German) or Távirda utca (in Hungarian), both meaning "telegraph".

== Location ==
It is located between Avram Imbroane, Gheorghe Adam, Calea Dorobanților, Splaiul Morarilor, and Mihail Kogălniceanu streets, part of the administrative district of Telegrafului + Dorobanților, managed by a "neighborhood manager" appointed by the city hall.
