= Bačka =

Historical region in Serbia and Hungary

Bačka Бачка (Serbian) Bácska (Hungarian)
- Historical region
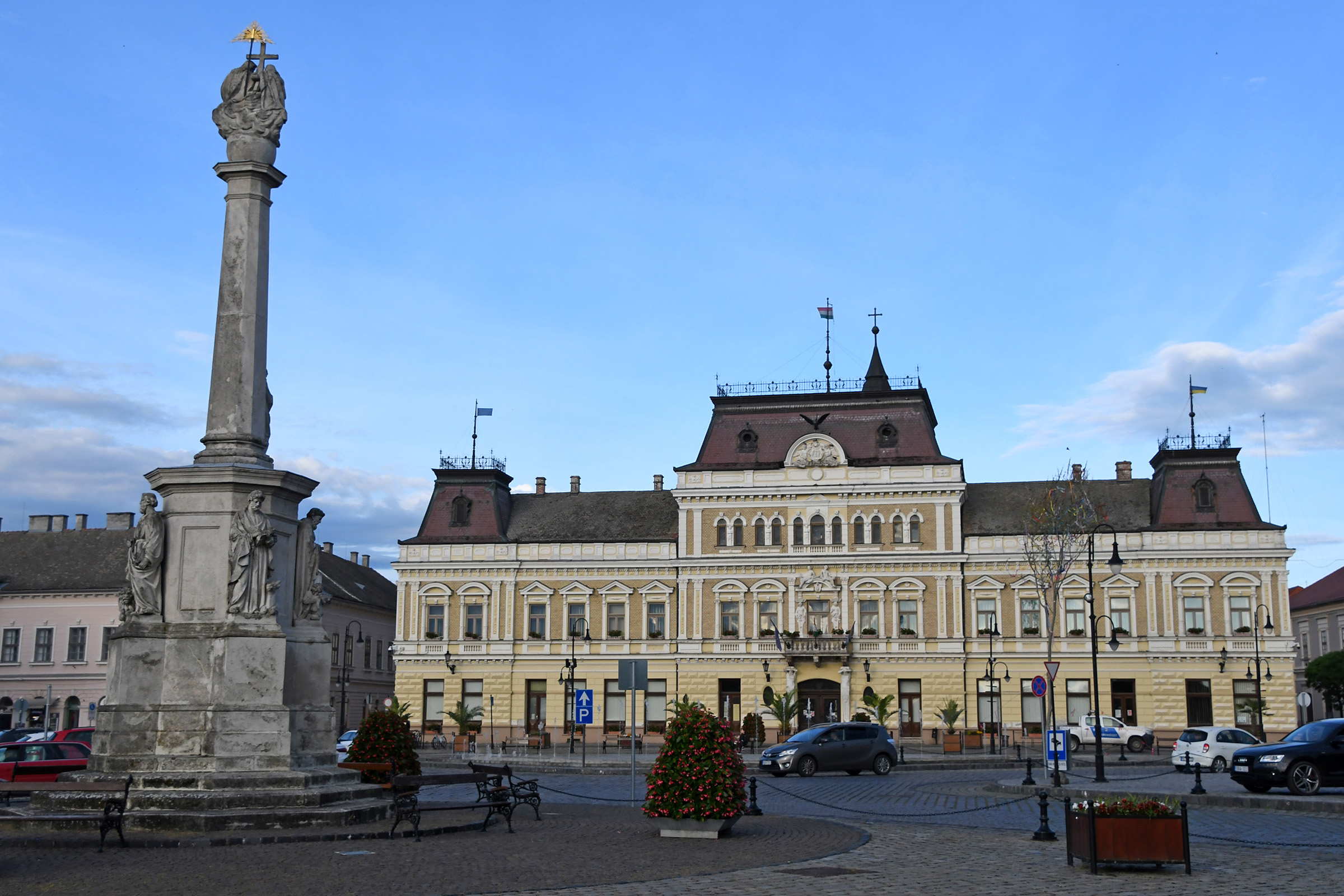
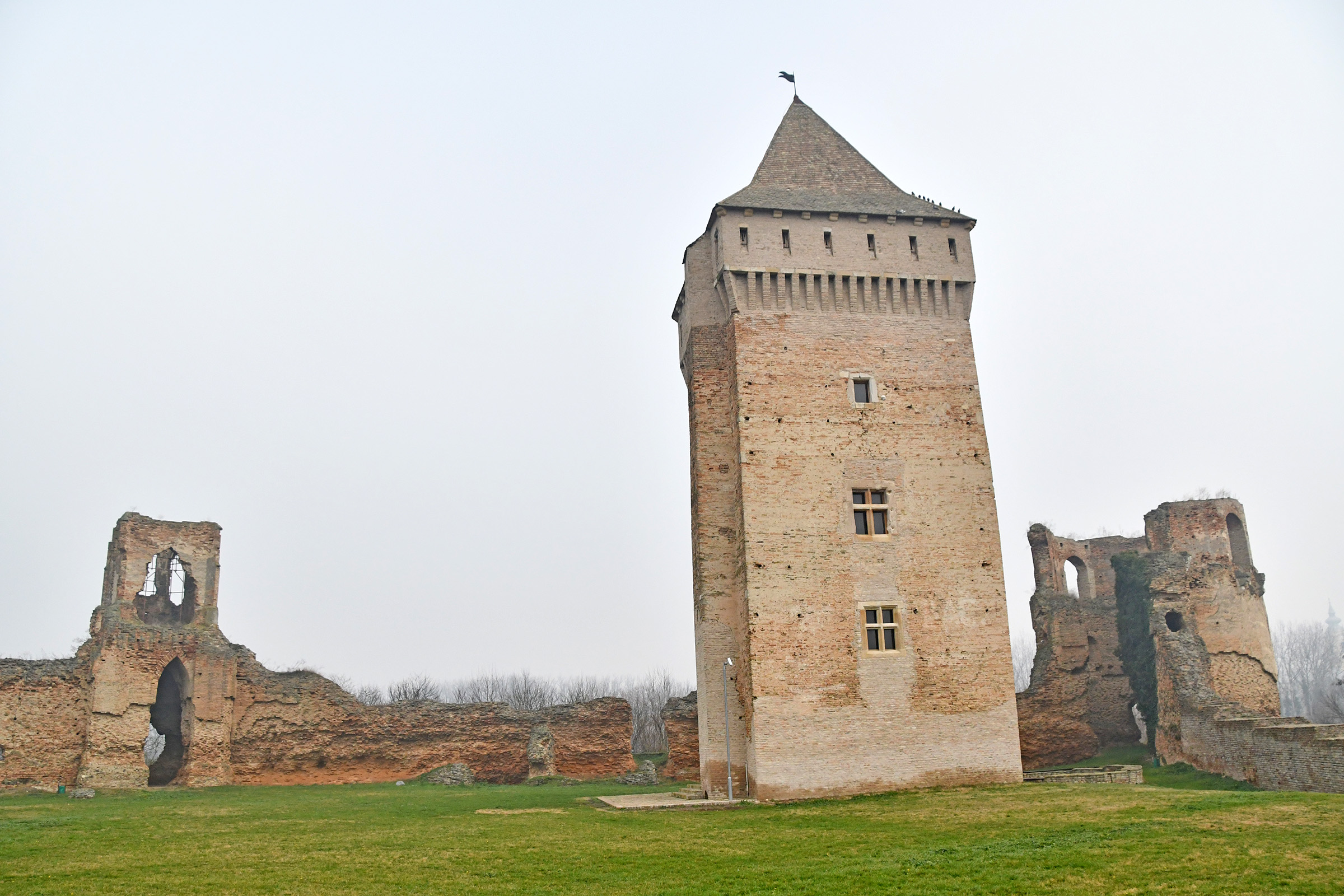
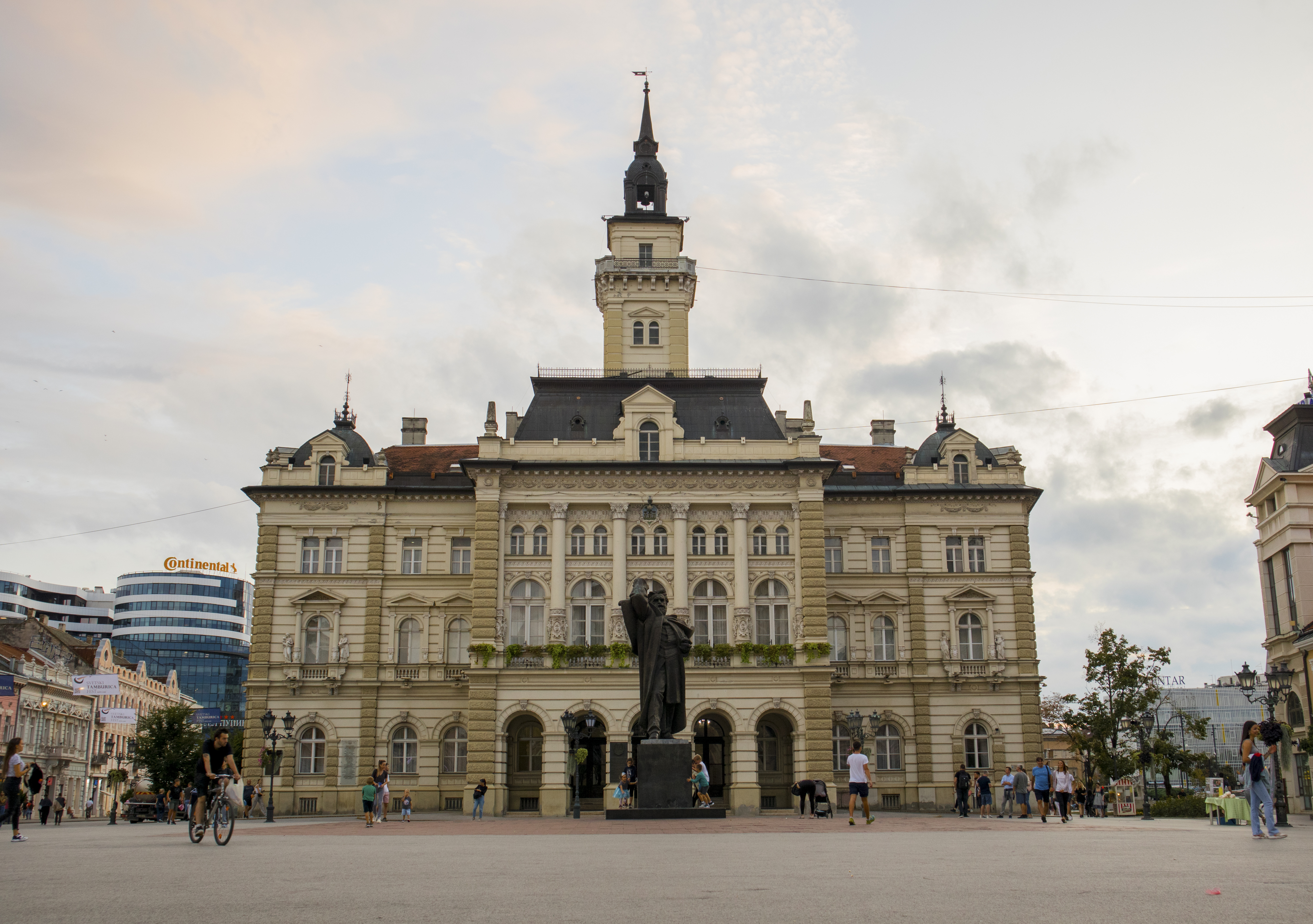
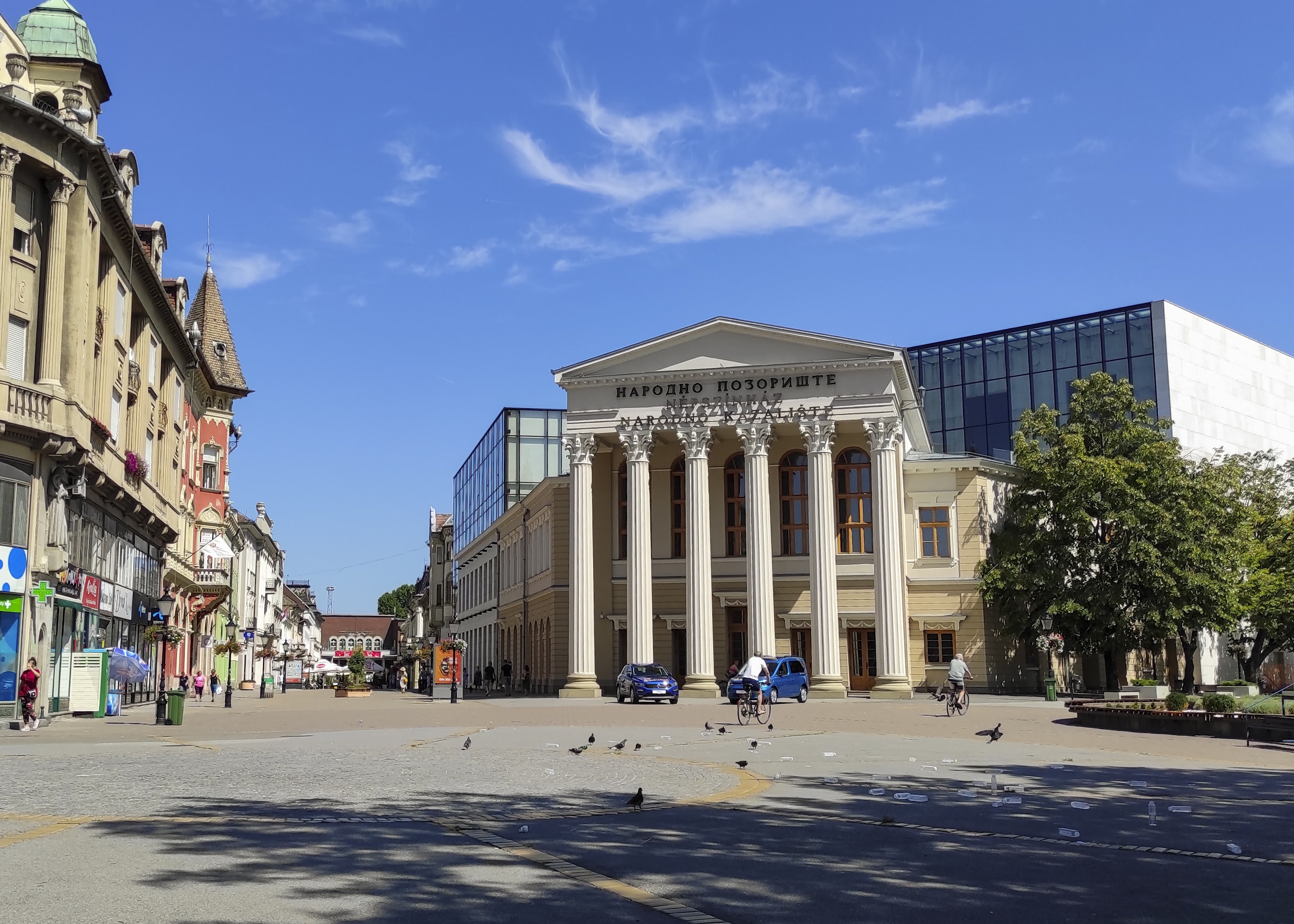
- From top, left to right: Baja; Bač Fortress; Novi Sad; Subotica

- Coat of arms

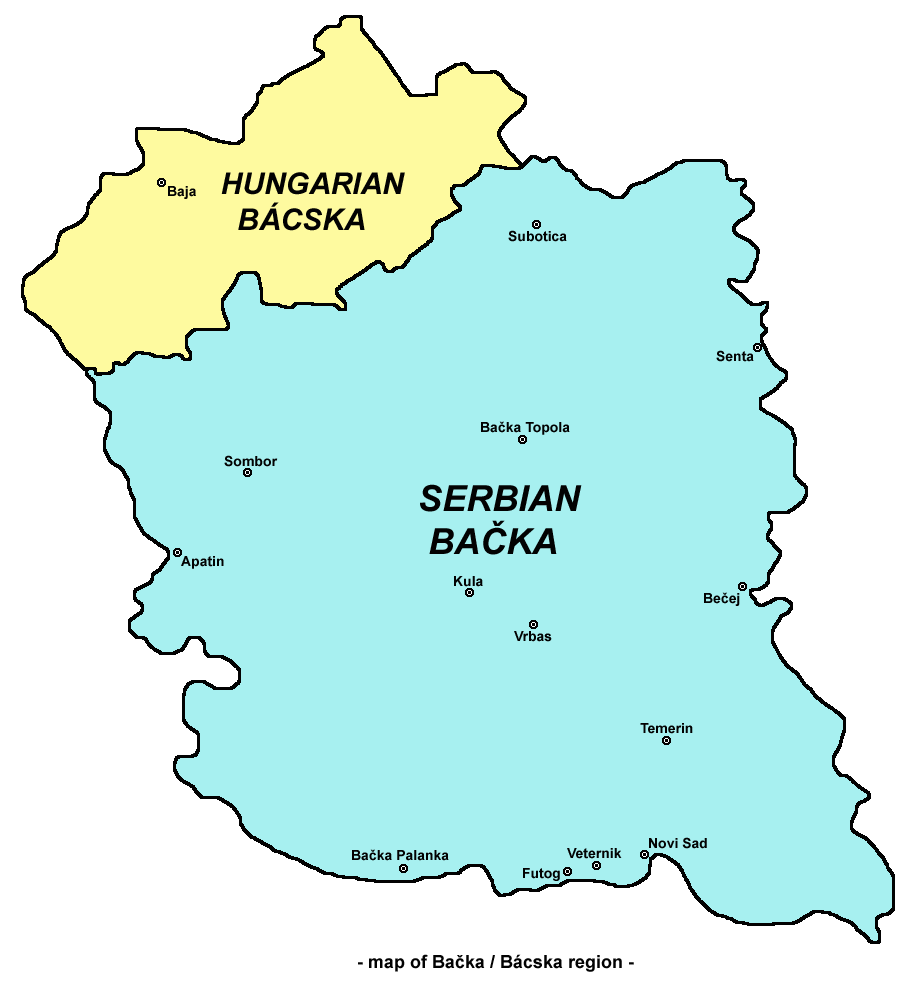
- Map of Bačka
- Coordinates: 46°00′N 19°20′E
- Country: Serbia; Hungary
- Largest city: Novi Sad
- Time zone: UTC+1 (CET)
  - Summer (DST): UTC+2 (CEST)

Bačka (Serbian: Бачка, pronounced [bâːtʃkaː]) or Bácska (pronounced [ˈbaːtʃkɒ]), is a geographical and historical region within the Pannonian Basin bordered by the river Danube to the west and south, and by the river Tisza to the east. It is divided between Serbia and Hungary. Most of the area is located within the Vojvodina region in Serbia and Novi Sad, the administrative center of Vojvodina, lies on the border between Bačka and Syrmia. The smaller northern part of the geographical area is located within Bács-Kiskun County in Hungary.

== Etymology ==
According to Serbian historians, Bačka is a typical Slavic name form, created from "Bač" (name of historical town in Bačka) and suffix "ka" (which designates "the land that belongs to Bač").

The name of "Bač" (Bács) town is of uncertain origin and its existence was recorded among Vlachs, Slavs and Hungarians in the Middle Ages. The origin of the name could be Paleo-Balkanic, Romanian, Slavic, or Old Turkic.

According to Hungarian historians, the denominator of the landscape may have been the first bailiff of Bač (Bács) castle, and the name which can be rendered probably Old Turkic baya derives from a dignity name.

In the 17th and 18th century, due to the large number of Serbs who lived in Bačka, this region was called »Ráczország« (Hungarian for "the Serb country"). Sometimes, the Hungarians used name Délvidék ("the southern or lower country") for a wider imprecisely defined geographical area, which, according to 19th century view also included Bačka. However, according to other Hungarian sources, Bačka was rather seen as part of Alföld.

== History ==
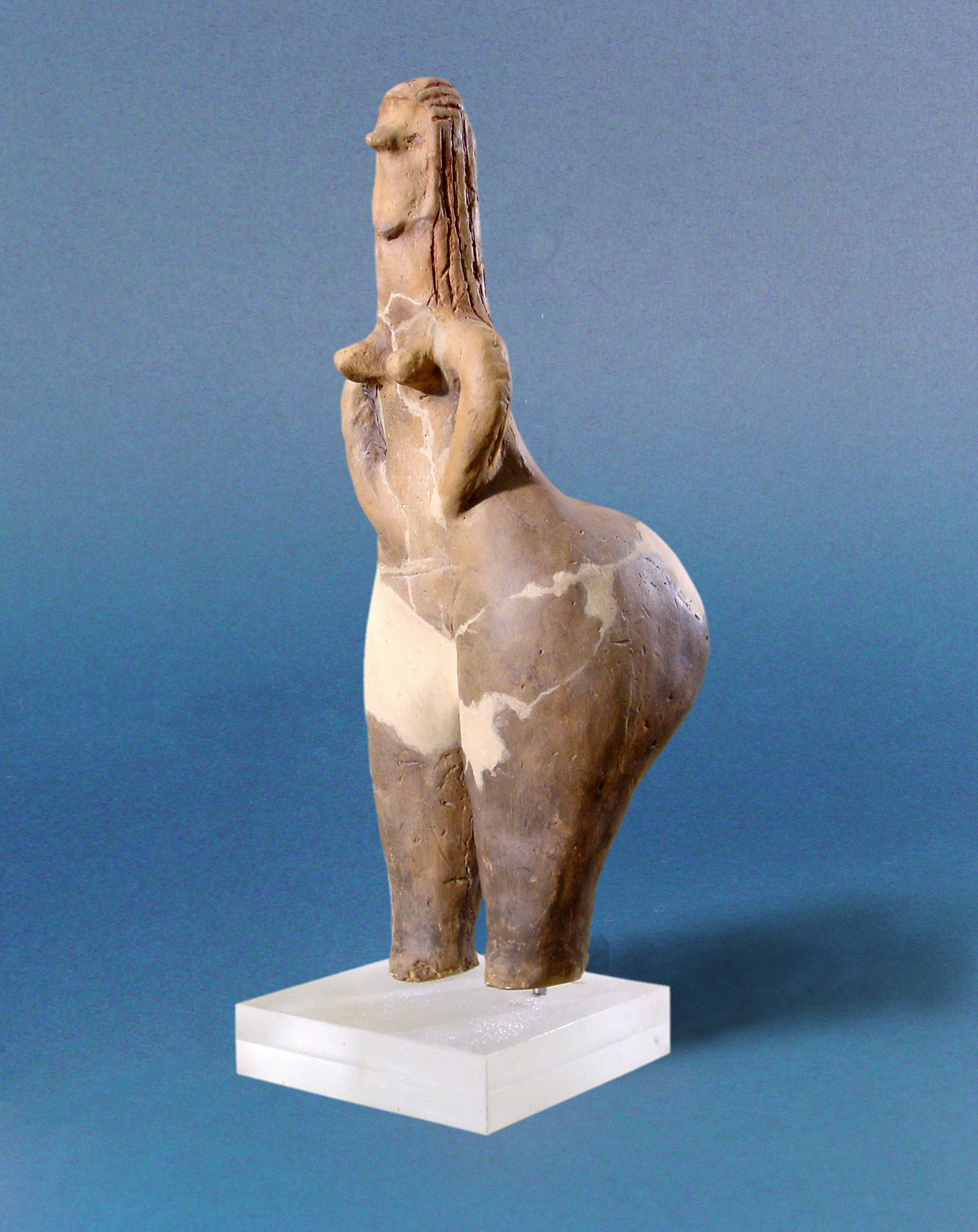
"Red-headed goddess", statuette from the early Neolithic period; archaeological site Donja Branjevina near Odžaci, Serbia

Through history, Bačka has been a part of Dacia, the Kingdom of the Iazyges, the Hun Empire, the Gepid Kingdom, the Avar Khanate, the First Bulgarian Empire, the Great Moravia, the Kingdom of Hungary, the Serb realm of Jovan Nenad, the Ottoman Empire, the Habsburg monarchy, the Austrian Empire, Austria-Hungary, the Kingdom of Serbia, the Kingdom of Serbs, Croats and Slovenes, the Kingdom of Yugoslavia, the Socialist Federal Republic of Yugoslavia, the Federal Republic of Yugoslavia, Serbia and Montenegro, and since 2006, it has been part of an independent Republic of Serbia. The smaller northern part of the region was part of the short-lived Serb-Hungarian Baranya-Baja Republic (in 1921) and part of Hungary since 1921.

People have inhabited the region of Bačka since Neolithic times. Indo-European peoples settled in this region in three migration waves dated in 4200 BC, 3300 BC, and 2800 BC respectively. The earliest historical inhabitants of the region were probably Illyrian tribes. Later, other Indo-European peoples, including Dacians, Celts, Sarmatians, or Iazyges were recorded as inhabitants of Bačka. The region was never directly incorporated into the Roman Empire, but some outposts of the Danubian Limes were established on the left banks of Danube, in Bačka.

=== Middle Ages ===
Since the end of the 5th century, the region was dominated by the Gepids, but their kingdom was destroyed in 567, and the entire Great Danubian Plain was overrun by Avars and Slavs. Thus, from the middle of the 6th century, and up to the end of the 8th century, the region was politically dominated by Avars, and also inhabited by Slavs. In the 790s, during the Avar Wars, declining Avar state was destroyed by the Franks, who imposed their dominance as far as Danube, occasionally crossing the river during military operations, and destroying the Avar Ring, a fortified capital city of Avar rulers, believed to be situated somewhere in the Bačka region. On the eastern banks of Danube, there lived Danubian Obodrites, also known as Praedenecenti, a Slavic tribe. In 822, they sent envoys to the Frankish emperor Louis the Pious, and again in 824, asking for Frankish assistance against the looming Bulgarian threat from the southeast.

In 827–829, dominance of the Bulgarian Khanate was expanded towards various Pannonian regions, including Bačka. Salan, a Bulgarian voivod (duke), was a ruler in this territory and his capital city was Titel. In the early 10th century, Hungarians defeated Salan, and his duchy came under Hungarian rule.

At the turn of the first millennium, during the administration of the medieval Kingdom of Hungary by Stephen I of Hungary, two counties (comitatus) were formed in this land. Bács County in the south, with city of Bács (now Bač) as its administrative centre and Bodrog County in the western and central territories with the historical city of Bodrogvár as capital (near the present-day village of Bački Monoštor). The two countries were later united to form Bács-Bodrog County. There were also territories of Csongrád County in the northeastern parts of Bačka. In 1085 King Ladislaus I made Bács the seat of the Archbishopric of Kalocsa-Bács. The first archbishop, Fabian (1085–1103) helped the king in the course of the campaign against Croatia and was rewarded with the title. According to Serbian sources, Ilija Vid, the first known prefect of Bacsensis County was recorded in 1068 and he was an ethnic Serb.

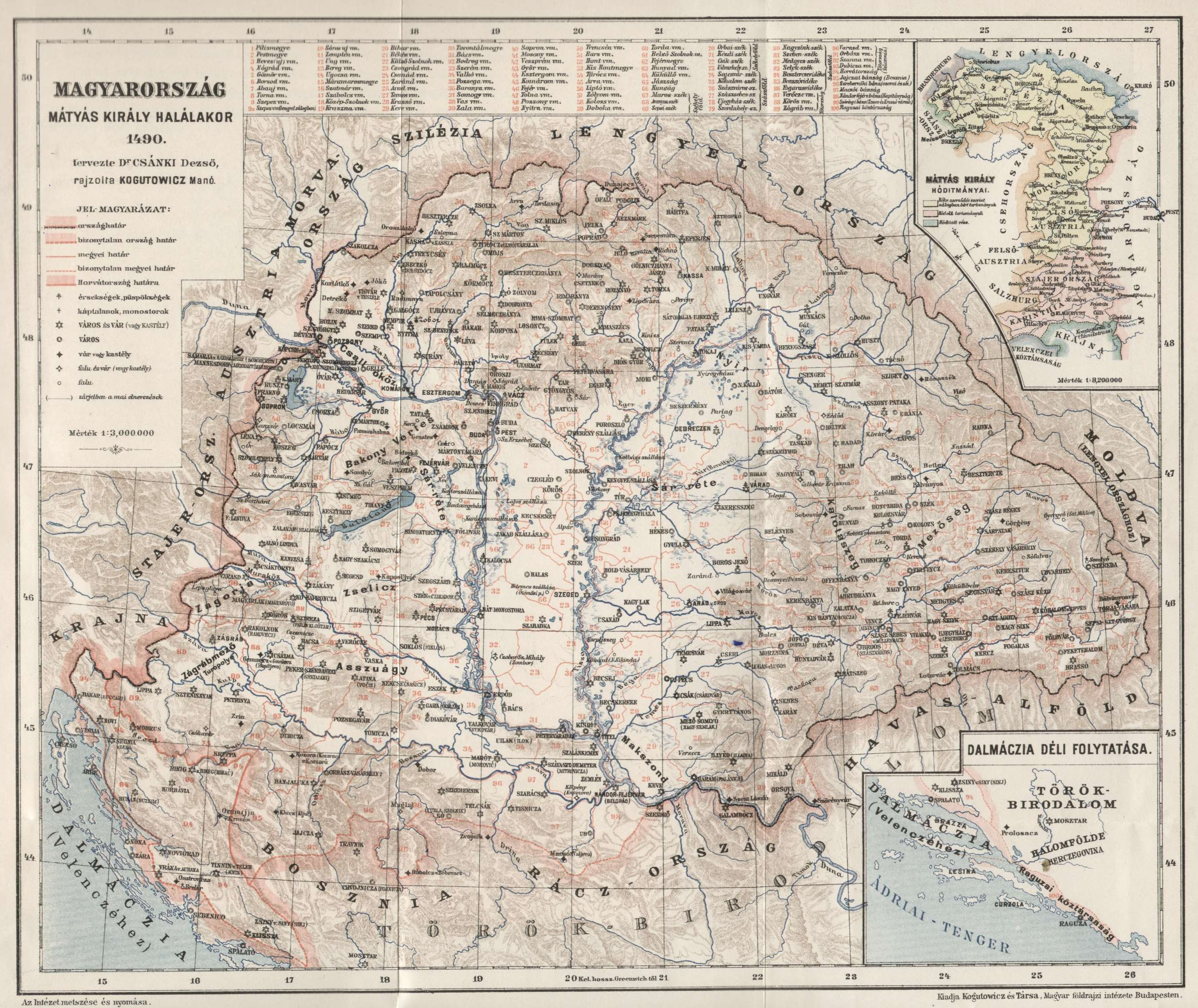
Kingdom of Hungary in 1490 (Bács County marked 31)

In this time, the region was populated by both, Slavs and Hungarians. Serbian historian Dr. Milenko Palić also mentions that prefect Vid was an ethnic Serb and that he, together with two other ethnic Serbs whose names were Ilija and Radovan, participated in dynastic struggles in the Kingdom of Hungary, in the end of the 11th century. According to Hungarian authors, prefect Vid belonged to the Gutkeled genus, but there is a possibility that he was a fictitious person. In 1169, canons from the knighthood Order of the Holy Sepulchre built a small church in Bács in the Romanesque style. They used some building materials from much older previous edifices. Franciscans took over the church in 1300. In the second half of the 14th century, the Franciscans expanded it, forming a monastery. Today the Fanciscian monastery of Bács is the oldest church building in present-day Vojvodina. In the early 13th century Ugrin Csák, Archbishop of Kalocsa, founded a hospital in Bács, as the first such facility in this part of Europe. Pope Gregory IX wrote about the "Bačka hospital" in 1234, as being open for the sick and poor. At the beginning of the fourteenth century the town of Bács prospered during the rule of king Charles Robert I, who started building the modern fortress in 1338–42 at the site of the earlier hillfort. From the 15th century, it became the most important Hungarian defense point against the invading Ottoman forces.

=== Early modern period ===
In 1526 the Kingdom of Hungary was defeated in the Battle of Mohács by the Ottoman Empire, King Louis II fell in the battle. After the victorious campaign the Ottoman army led by Suleiman I withdrew from Hungary through the Danube–Tisza Interfluve, leaving only smaller garrisons in the fortifications. Within two to three weeks the retreating army killed approximately 400.000 men, burned down almost all the settlements, desolating the whole region. In this chaotic period took place the revolt of the Rascians and Bačka became (from 1526 to 1527) the central region of an independent, short-lived Serbian pseudostate, which existed in the territory of present-day Vojvodina. The ruler of this state was the self-appointed Emperor Jovan Nenad (previously the stableman of the king John Zápolya) and his capital city was Subotica. After Jovan Nenad was defeated and killed, his state collapsed and Bačka, for a short time, came again under Hungarian administration. Soon, the region became part of the Ottoman Empire.

After the Ottoman conquest, most of the previously decisive Hungarian majority population have fled (in the 16th–17th centuries). The relatively dense populated and prosperous southern counties of the Kingdom were devastated and became mostly abandoned and depopulated. During the Ottoman period, and later in the 17th and 18th century begun the intense settlement of the Serbs and other South Slavs from the Ottoman ruled central Balkans. They were military engaged in the borderlands by both sides. This resulted in radical changes of the population structure. Hungarian, Serb and Bunjevci peasants, and Serb and Vlach peasant soldiers lived (in ever-decreasing number) in the area, who had an impact on the landscape with their farming. In the Ottoman towns there was a Muslim population, and outside the city wall there were communities of various Christian denominations and occupations. Bačka was part of the Sanjak of Segedin (Szeged), the region was sparsely populated with Serbs (who were in an absolute majority) and Muslims.

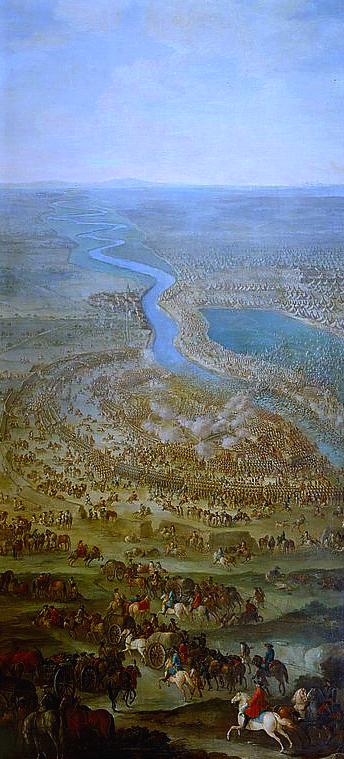
Battle of Zenta

During the Great Turkish War (1683–1699) on 11 September 1697, near Senta in the eastern Bačka took place one of the most decisive defeats in Ottoman history, the Battle of Zenta. Christian forces of the Holy League (1684) led by Prince Eugene of Savoy in a surprise attack destroyed the Ottoman army crossing the river Tisza. The battle resulted in a spectacular victory for Austria. As a result, in 1699 the Treaty of Karlowitz was signed, ending the Ottoman control in much of Central Europe. All the lands of the Kingdom of Hungary (except for Banat and a small chunk of Eastern Slavonia) conquered by the Ottomans in the previous 150 years were returned. Under the rule of Leopold I the Bačka became a possession of the Habsburg monarchy. Bács-Bodrog County was established in the western parts of the region and it was re-integrated into the county system of the Kingdom of Hungary, while some other (mostly eastern) parts of the Bačka were incorporated into the Tisza-Maros section of Habsburg Military Frontier, which was directly administered by the Imperial Habsburg court in Vienna. There were significant differences in the status of the inhabitants of the feudal county and the privileged newcome settlers of the Military Frontier, who composed mostly of ethnic Serbs. The Grenz infantry of the Military Frontier was primarily formed to defend Austria against the Ottoman Turks, but impliedly it was intended to offset and control the Hungarian population. This position was several times used by the Habsburg rulers as a political and tactical instrument in the following centuries.

In the Rákóczi's War of Independence heavy fightings took place also in Bačka. In 1704 Francis II Rákóczi led a victorious campaign in this parts. The Serbs fought on the Emperor's side since the beginning of the war. They were used as the light cavalry in the Austrian army and as tax collectors. During the eight years of war Hungarian villages and towns of the Great Hungarian Plain and Transdanubia were burnt and robbed by the Serbs, while in Bácska Serb villages were burnt. However, there were some Serbs who fought on Rakóczi's side against the Habsburgs – the Frontiersmen of Semlak. The leader of the Kuruc Serb troops was Frontier Captain Obrad Lalić from Senta. Later, some parts of the Military Frontier were abolished in 1751, these parts of Bačka were also included into Bács-Bodrog County. The only part of Bačka which remained within the Military Frontier was Šajkaška, but it also came under civil administration in 1873.

According to the Austrian censuses from 1715 to 1720, Serbs, Bunjevci, and Šokci comprised most of the region's population (97.6% of population according to 1715–1720 census data). There were only 530 or 1.9% Hungarians and 0.5% Germans. During the 18th century, the Habsburgs carried out an intensive colonisation of the area, which had low population density after the last Ottoman Wars, as much of the Serbian population had been decimated through warfare. Muslim population had almost entirely left or was expelled from the region and some of the Muslim refugees from this area settled in Ottoman Bosnia. The new settlers in Bačka were primarily Serbs who moved from Ottoman Balkans, Hungarians – returning to Bačka from all parts of the Habsburg Hungary, and Germans. Because many of the Germans came from Swabia, they were known as Donauschwaben, or Danube Swabians. Some Germans also came from Austria, and some from Bavaria and Alsace. Lutheran Slovaks, Rusyns, and others were also colonized but to a much smaller extent.

There was also an emigration of Serbs from the eastern parts of the region, which belonged to Military Frontier until 1751. After the abolition of the Tisa-Mureş section of Military Frontier, many Serbs emigrated from north-eastern parts of Bačka. They moved either to Russia (notably to New Serbia and Slavo-Serbia) or to Banat, where the Military Frontier was still needed.

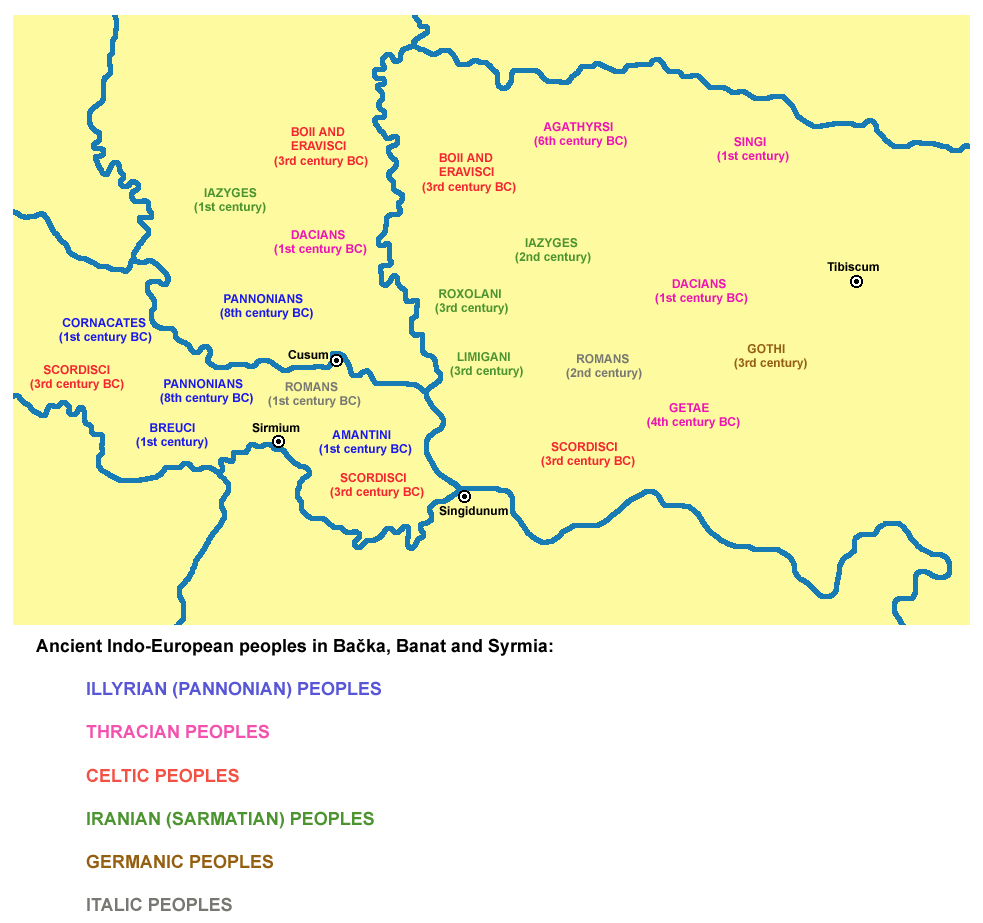
Ancient Indo-European peoples in Bačka

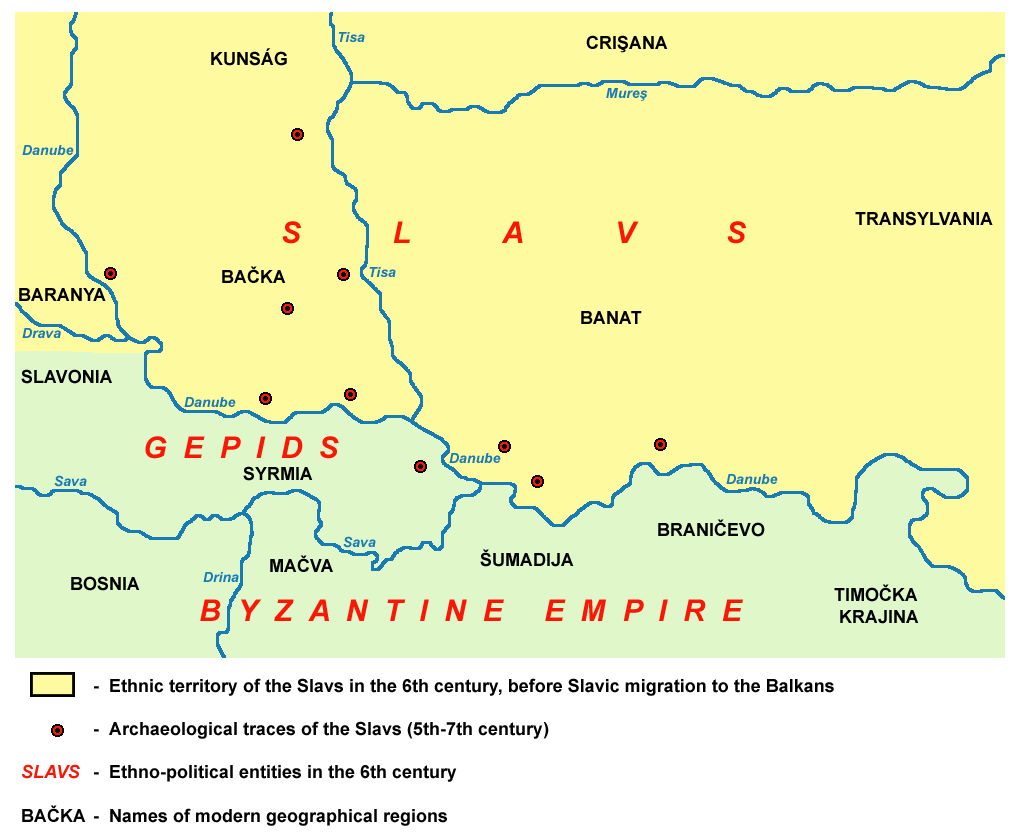
Slavs in Bačka in the 6th century

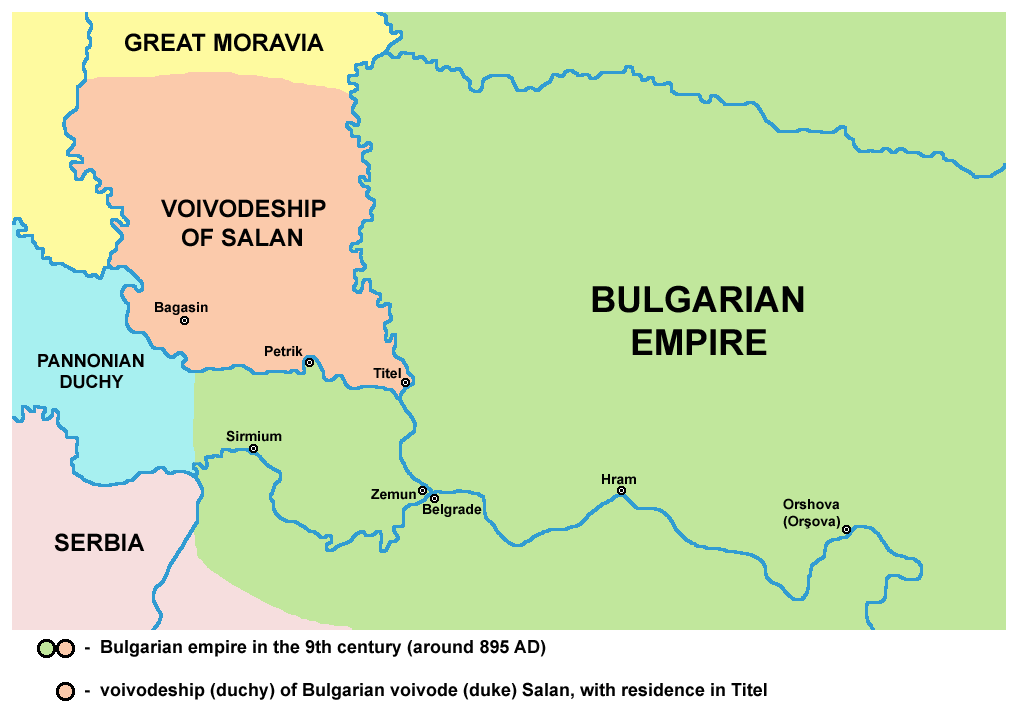
Voivodeship (Duchy) of Bulgarian duke Salan, 9th century

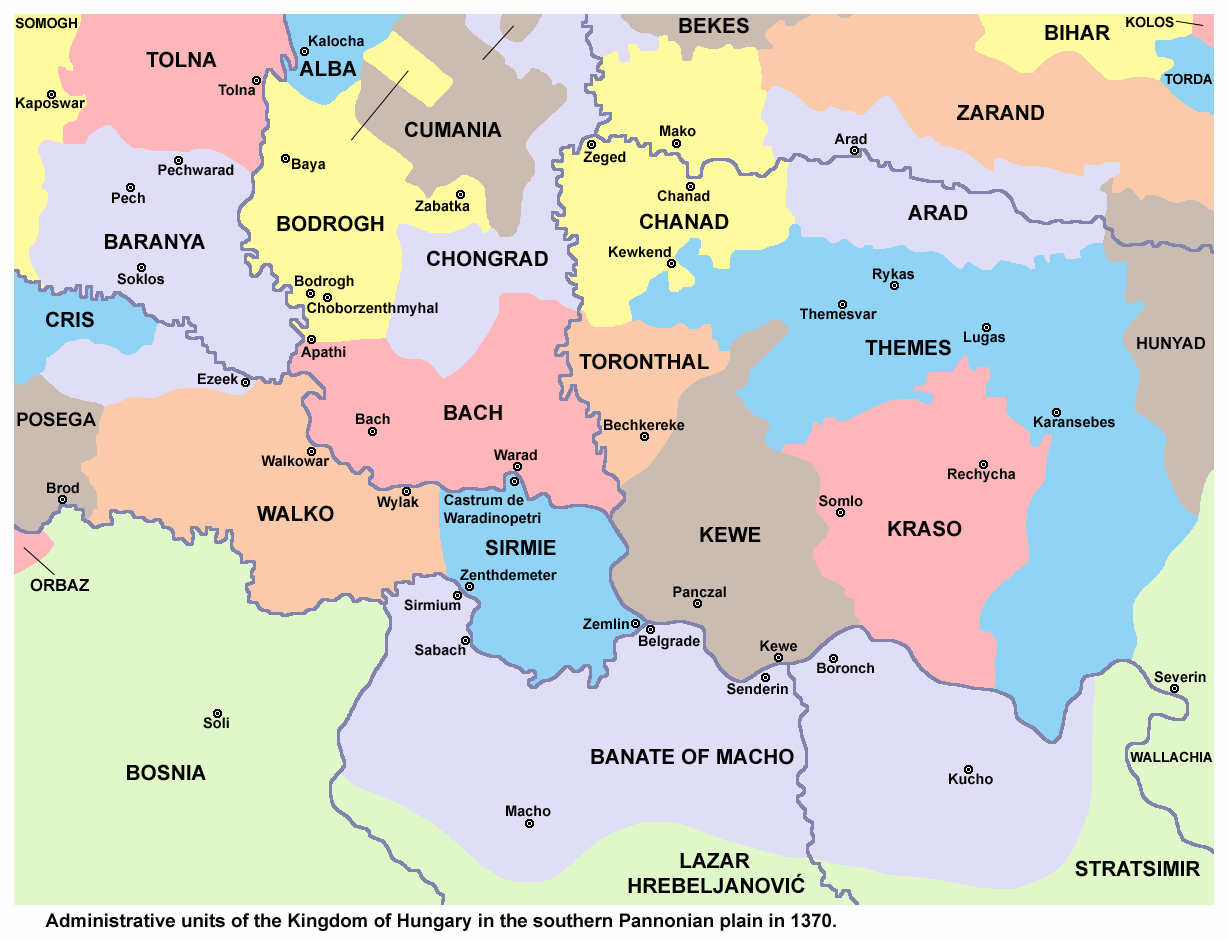
Bach and Bodrogh counties in the 14th century

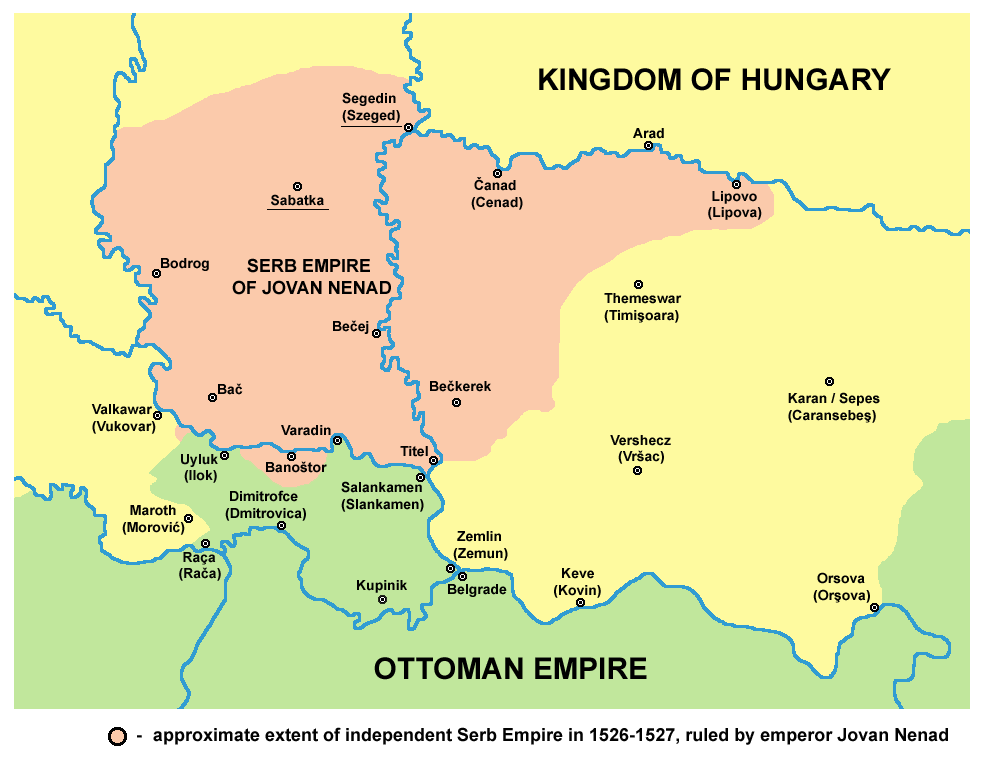
Serbian empire of Jovan Nenad, 1526–1527

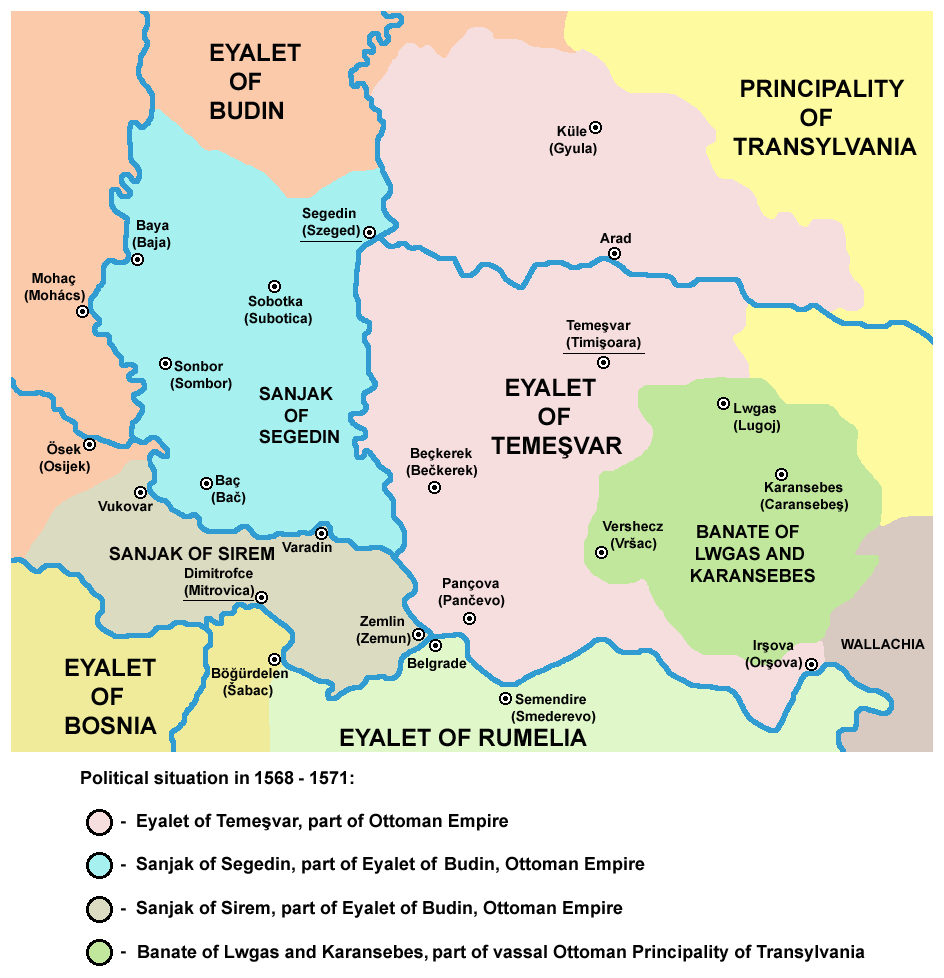
Bačka as part of the Ottoman Sanjak of Segedin in 1568–1571

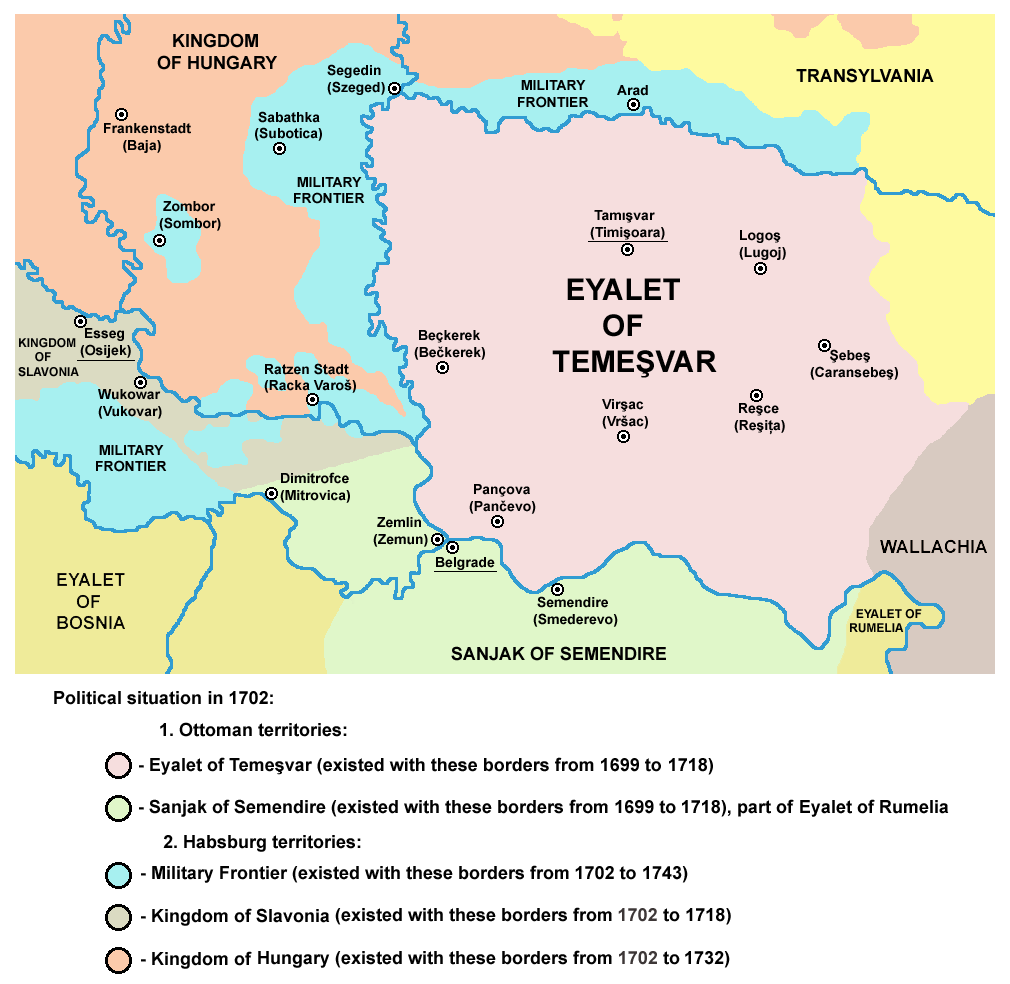
Military Frontier in Bačka in 1699

=== 19th century ===
In 1848 and 1849, in the course of the Hungarian Revolution and War of Independence broke out the Serb uprising in the Délvidék. The rebels fought on the side of the Habsburg army (together with the German and Romanian regiments from Banat and numerous voluntiers from the Principality of Serbia) against the legitimate Hungarian government and the Hungarian Revolutionary Army. The fightings were characterized by largely ethnically motivated, bloody atrocities on the civilians, mostly executed by the irregular Serb forces. One of the most illustrative events was the "Bloody Candlemas" of 1849 in Senta (Hungarian: véres gyertyaszentelő). On 2 February the Serb forces overrun and conquered the city, resulting mass looting, arson and massacre of the Hungarian inhabitants. In the following weeks of the occupation 2000–2800 civilians were killed partially with the assistance of the local Serbs. As the result of the uprising Bačka was proclaimed as part of the Serbian Voivodship, meant as a Serbian autonomous region within Austrian Empire, while between 1849 and 1860 it was part of the Voivodeship of Serbia and Banat of Temeschwar, a separate Austrian crown land (the official languages of the voivodship were German and Illyrian, i.e. Serbo-Croatian). After 1860, when the Voivodeship of Serbia and Banat of Temeschwar was abolished, Bács-Bodrog County was again formed in the territory of Bačka. The county was part of the Kingdom of Hungary, which became one of two constitutient parts of Austria-Hungary in 1867. According to the 1910 census, the population of Bačka numbered 704,563 people and was composed of: 43.2% speakers of Hungarian (310,490), 28.1% speakers of South Slavic (Serbo-Croatian) language and 22.5% speakers of German. Linguistic composition of the region is partially different from ethnic composition since some ethnic Jews and bilingual South Slavs were in this census recorded as speakers of Hungarian language.

=== 20th century ===
In early September 1914, several years before the end of the Austria-Hungary, in a town in the West Vojvodina Bačka region known as Zombor or Sombor of some 30,000 people, including 12,000 Serbs, popular demonstrations demanded the removal of all shop signs in the Cyrillic alphabet. When an angry mob chased one Serb shopkeeper to his home for refusing to remove his Cyrillic sign, he responded by shooting at the demonstrators. The local military commander demanded the shopkeeper's immediate extradition, court martialed him and executed him on the spot. The court martial also designated twelve more affluent hostages from among the Serb population who would be "arrested and immediately executed by the military authorities" in the case of any obstruction or opposition shown by the local [Serb] population to the military authorities.".

At the end of October 1918, Austria-Hungary gradually dissolved and, with the Armistice of Villa Giusti of 3 November, officially capitulated to the Triple Entente. Under the Armistice of Belgrade (signed on 13 November), armed forces of Austria-Hungary retreated from the entire territory of the Bács-Bodrog county, and the region was possessed by the Allied Army of the Orient, thus allowing the Serbian Royal Army to establish effective military control south of the Baja-Szeged line.

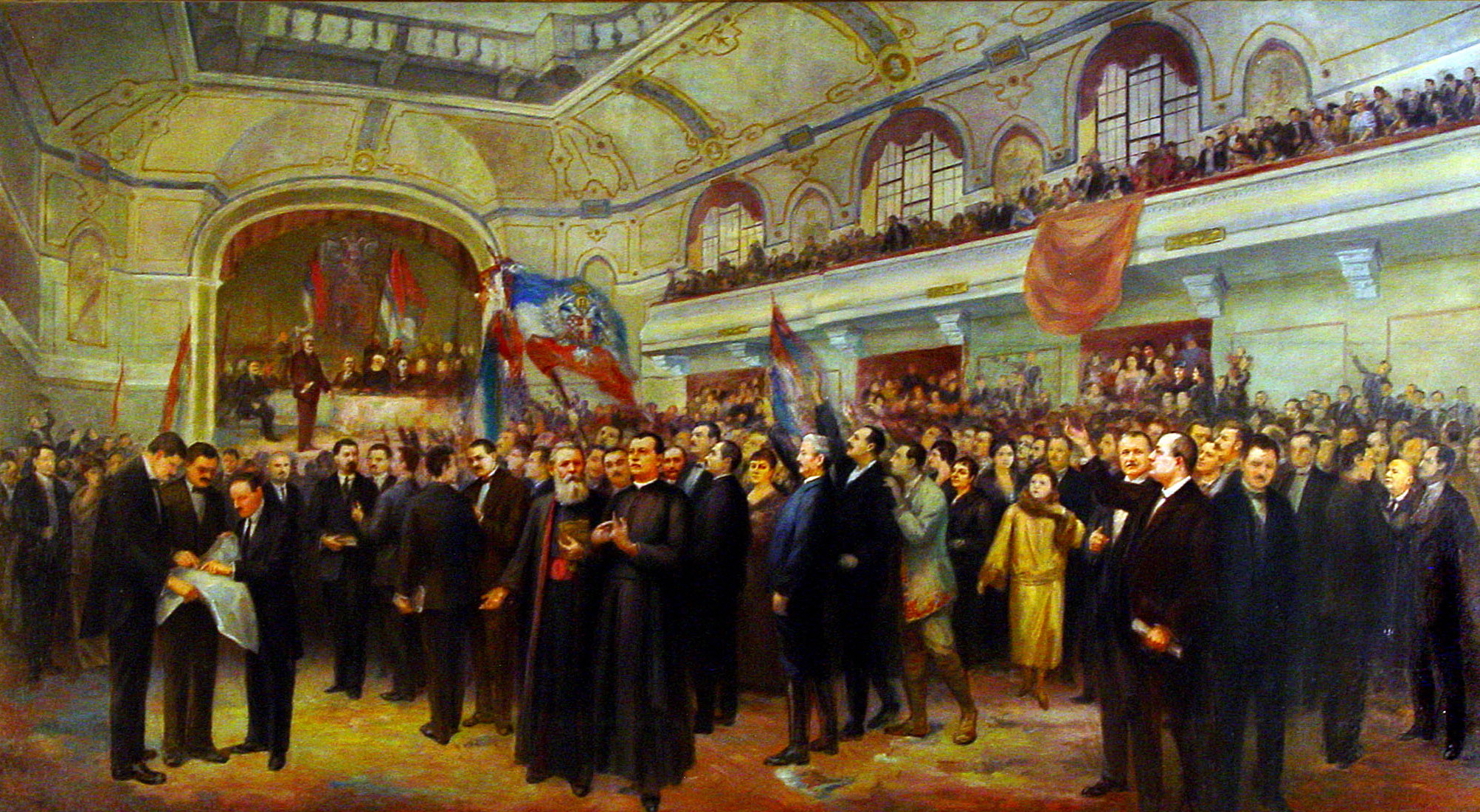
Great National Assembly in Novi Sad, 1918

By that time, the dissolution of Austria-Hungary entered its final stages, and on 16 November the First Hungarian Republic was proclaimed. Slavs from Banat, Bačka and Baranja organized a new civil administration in these regions as well as their own military units known as People's Guard (Serbian: Narodna straža). The new civil administration was composed of local People's Boards (Serbian: Narodni odbori), which were subordinated to Serb People's Board (Serbian: Srpski narodni odbor) in Novi Sad. Military units of Serb People's Board also possessed aircraft from the Novi Sad Airport. After elections, which were organized between 18 and 24 November, the Great National Assembly (held on 25 November 1918) proclaimed unification of these regions with the Kingdom of Serbia.

The assembly represented only a part of the whole population and did not met the principle of the self-determination of nations. It numbered 757 deputies, of which 578 were Serbs, 84 Bunjevci, 62 Slovaks, 21 Rusyn, 6 Germans, 3 Šokci, 2 Croats and 1 Hungarian, despite the fact that the absolute majority of the population of these regions was Hungarian and German. New administrative bodies of Banat, Bačka and Baranja (government and parliament) were also formed. Although, government in Belgrade accepted decision of unification with Serbia, it never recognized new provincial government. The provincial administration, however, was active until 12 March 1919, when it held its last session.

On 1 December 1918, the Kingdom of Serbia united with the State of Slovenes, Croats and Serbs to form new country named the Kingdom of Serbs, Croats, and Slovenes. Sovereignty of new kingdom was recognized by the Treaty of Saint Germain in 1919. The Treaty of Trianon of 4 June 1920 defined the exact borders between Hungary and the Kingdom of Serbs, Croats and Slovenes (which was later renamed to Kingdom of Yugoslavia) and original territory of Bačka was divided between these two countries. The northern part of the region was a separate county of Hungary (Bács-Bodrog) with seat in Baja, which was later incorporated into Bács-Kiskun county. The southern part of the region was within the District of Novi Sad of the Kingdom of Serbs, Croats, and Slovenes between 1918 and 1922, then was divided between Bačka Oblast and Belgrade Oblast, provinces (oblasts) of the kingdom, between 1922 and 1929. In 1929, it was incorporated into Danube Banovina, which was a province of the Kingdom of Yugoslavia.

Between 1820 and 1910, Hungarian speaking population in Bačka increased from 121,688 (31.5%) to 363,518 (44.75%). In the same time, percentage of South Slavs decreased from 44% in 1820 to 27% in 1910. 1921 census showed about 40,000 Hungarian speakers less than in census of 1910. This was especially case in Subotica where 1910 census recorded 55.587 speakers of Hungarian and 33,247 speakers of Bunjevac, while census of 1921 recorded 60,700 speakers of Serbian or Croatian and 26,750 speakers of Hungarian. This is explained by the fact that ethnic Bunjevci from Subotica who had knowledge of Hungarian language were listed as speakers of Hungarian by 1910 census. Between 1921 and 1931 census, number of Hungarian speakers in Bačka increased from 260,998 to 268,711. Slavic population increased by 91,800 inhabitants.

In 1941, Yugoslav Bačka was occupied by the Axis powers and attached to Horthy's Hungary (but was still internationally recognized as part of Yugoslavia). Before this occupation, according to 1931 census, Yugoslav Bačka had 784,896 inhabitants, of whom there were 284,865 Yugoslavs (Serbs, Croats, Bunjevci, Šokci), 268,711 Hungarians and 169,858 Germans. Hungarian occupation authorities expelled several thousands of Serbs from the region and settled ethnic Hungarians from other parts of Central Europe in their place, so that the Hungarian census of 1941 recorded different a demographic composition in the region. According to this census, the territory of Bačka had 789,705 inhabitants, of which 45.4% or 47.2% were speakers of Hungarian language (not all of them native, however). During the occupation, Hungarian troops killed about 20,000 Serbs, Jews and Roma.

The occupation ended in 1944 and Yugoslav Bačka became part of the new Democratic Federal Yugoslavia (later the Socialist Federal Republic of Yugoslavia). Following the defeat of the Axis troops, most of the German population that lived in the area left the region together with German army. The smaller part of the German population – round 75 thousands of people – that did not leave the area (mostly women, children and the elderly) were sent to prison camps, where many of them died of malnutrition and disease. After the war, members of the Yugoslav Partisan army also killed several tens of thousands of inhabitants of German, Hungarian and Serb ethnic origin. Estimates about numbers of victims of the Partisans (in whole of Vojvodina) are between 17,000 and 56,000 killed Germans, between 4,000 and 40,000 Hungarians killed, and about 23,000–24,000 Serbs killed.

After the World War II, along with eastern Syrmia, western Banat, and northern Mačva, Yugoslav Bačka has been part of Serbia and its province of Vojvodina.

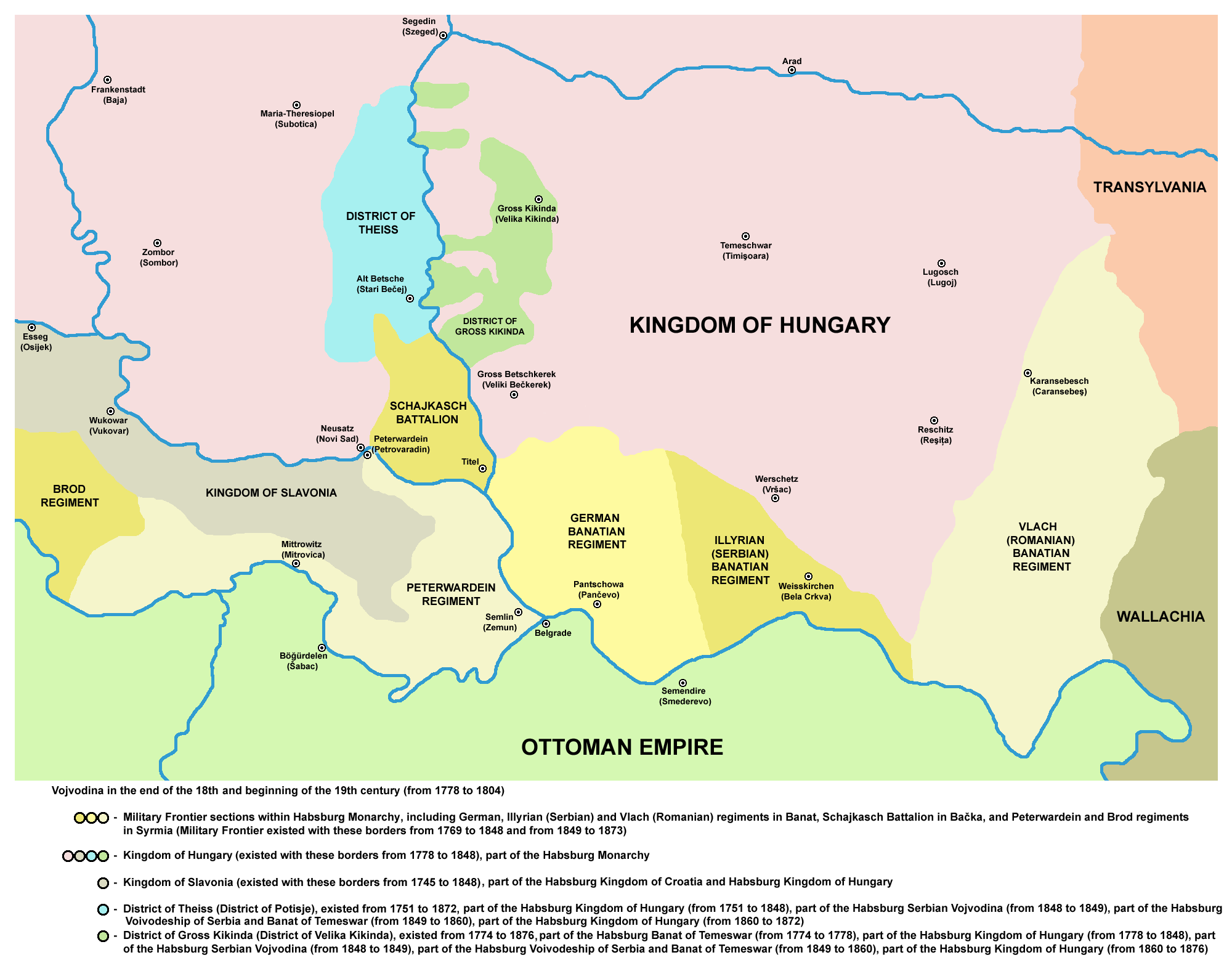
District of Potisje and Schajkasch Battalion, 18th-19th century

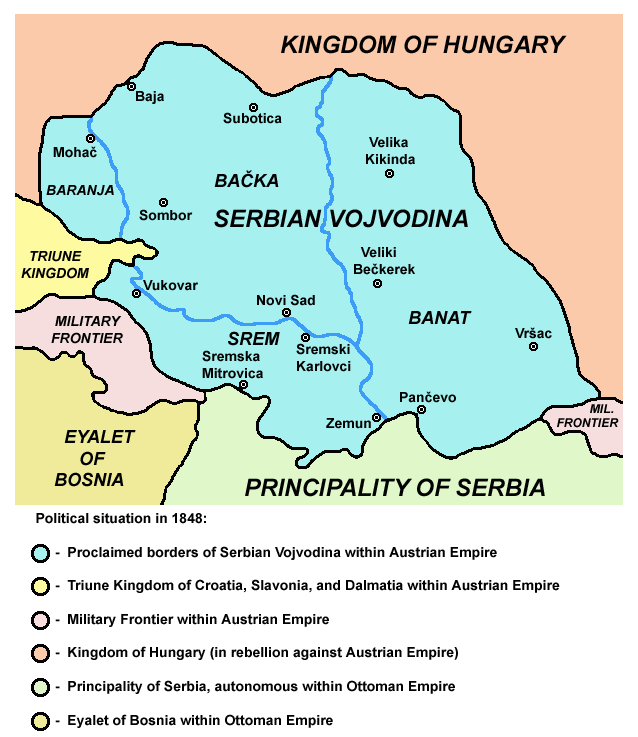
Bačka within the proclaimed borders of Serbian Voivodship in 1848

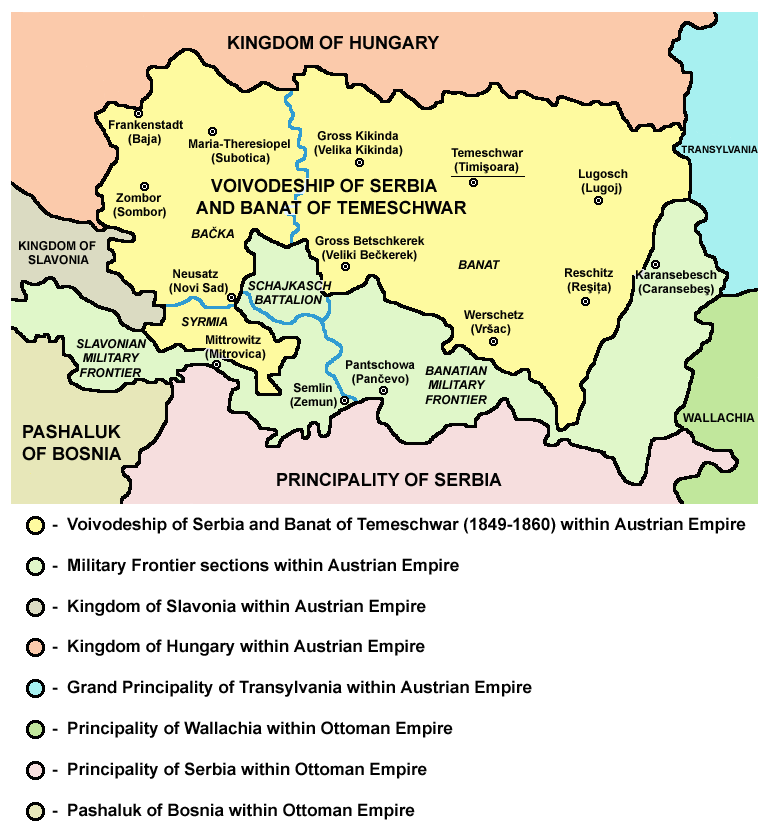
Voivodeship of Serbia and Banat of Temeschwar (1849–1860)

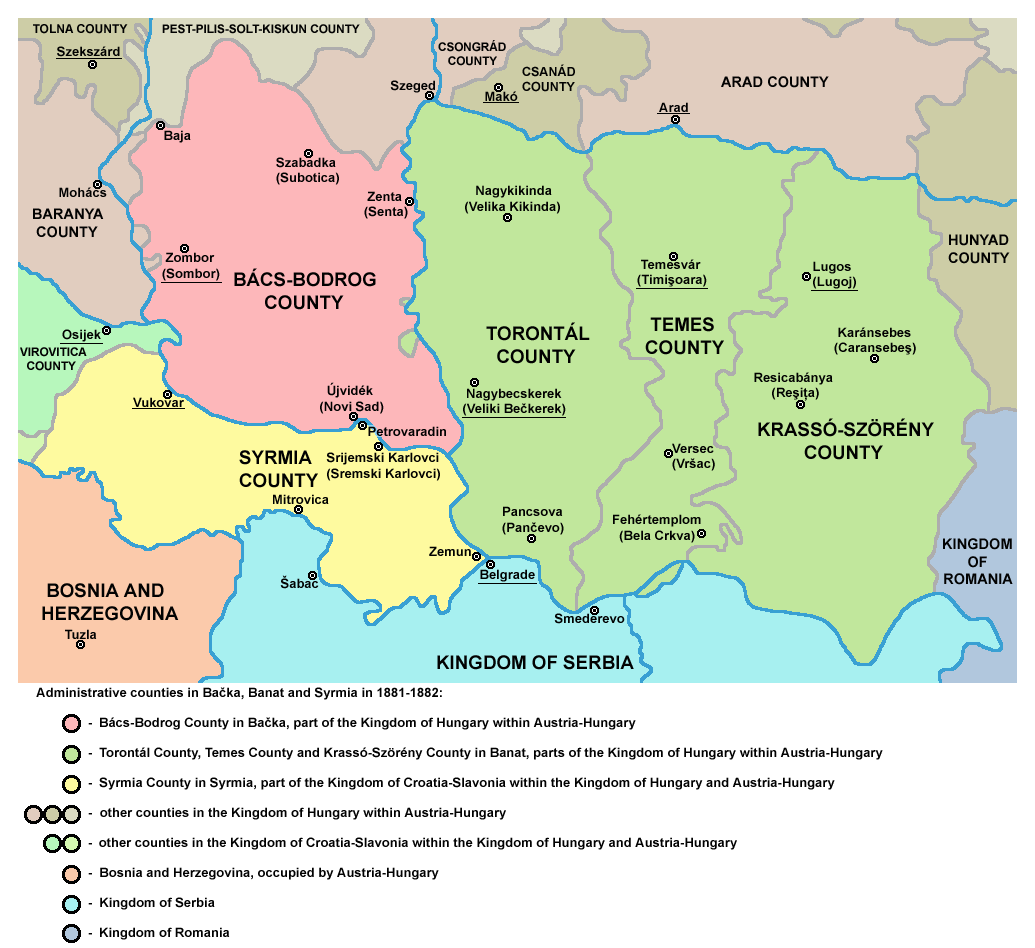
Banat, Bačka and Syrmia after 1881, the five counties, which were formed in the territory of the former Voivodeship of Serbia and Banat of Temeschwar

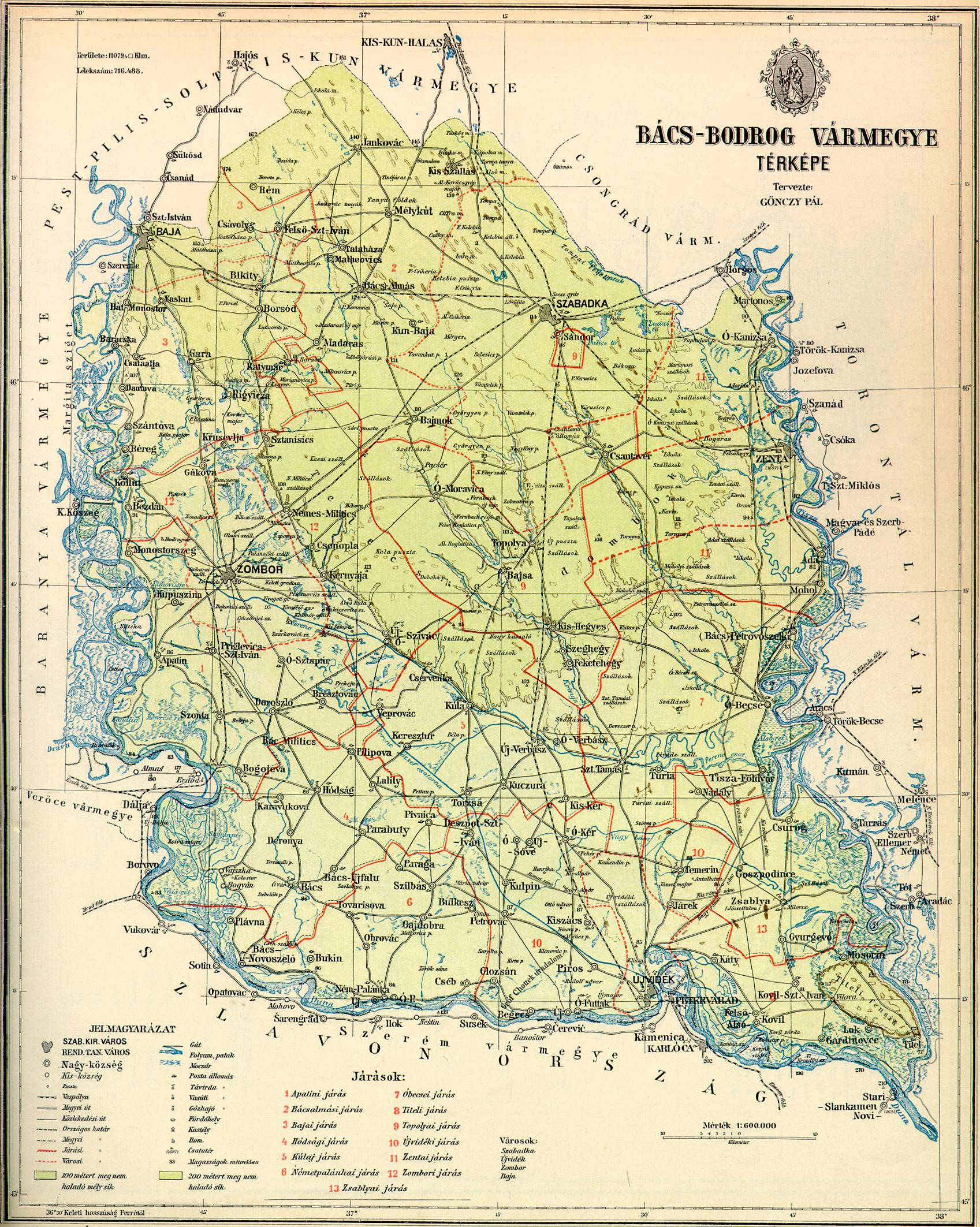
Detailed map of Bács-Bodrog County

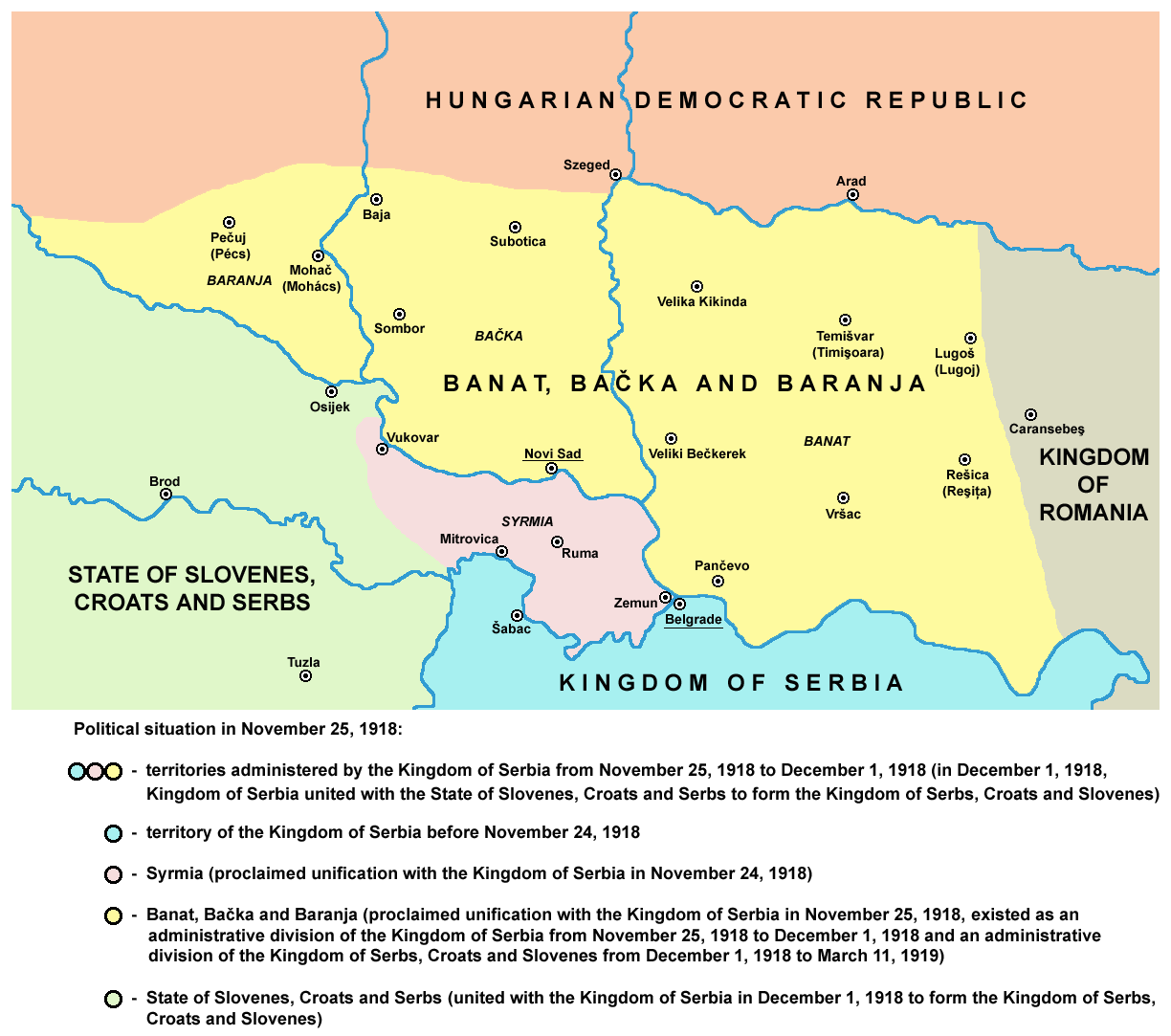
Banat, Bačka and Baranja in 1918

== Geography ==
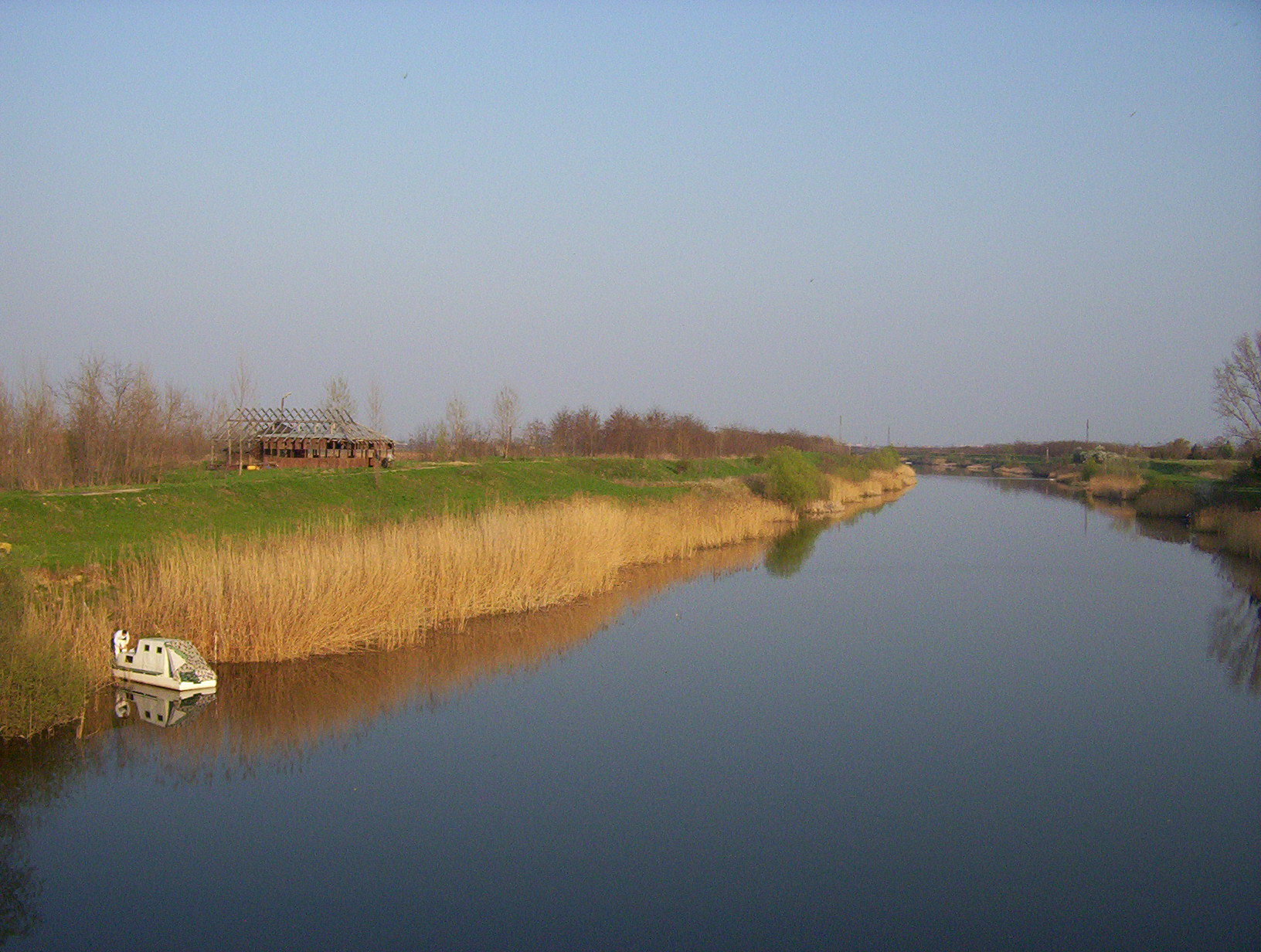
The Little Bačka Canal, part of the Danube–Tisa–Danube Canal system, near Novi Sad

Bačka is a flat, fertile agricultural area within the larger Pannonian Plain, which was once the ancient Pannonian Sea. In Hungary, it is seen as a southern extension of the Great Alfold (itself part of the Pannonian Plain), while this designation is not used in Serbia where region is simply seen as a part of the Pannonian Plain. It lies between the River Danube to the west and south, and by the River Tisa (Tisza) to the east of which confluence is located near Titel in the South Bačka District of Serbia. The region is crisscrossed by parts of the Danube–Tisa–Danube Canal system which serves a variety of economic purposes. Almost all of Bačka is divided between Serbia and Hungary. However, there are small uninhabited pockets of the area on the left bank of the Danube which are de jure parts of Croatia according to the Badinter Commission; the disputed areas have been under de facto Serbian control since 1991.

Most of the territory and a vast majority of the population of Bačka is part of Serbia's Autonomous Province of Vojvodina. This area within Serbia is officially divided into the districts of Southern Bačka, Western Bačka, and Northern Bačka. Novi Sad, the capital of Vojvodina, lies on the border between Bačka and Syrmia, on both banks of the river Danube. In some sources, Serbian part of Bačka is referred to as Central and Southern Bačka (Serbian: Средња и јужна Бачка / Srednja i južna Bačka; Hungarian: Közép- és Dél-Bácska) or simply Southern Bačka (Serbian: Јужна Бачка / Južna Bačka; Dél-Bácska). The smaller part of the region in Hungary's Bács-Kiskun County is, by the same sources, described as Northern Bačka (Hungarian: Észak-Bácska; Serbian: Северна Бачка / Severna Bačka).

=== Serbian Bačka ===
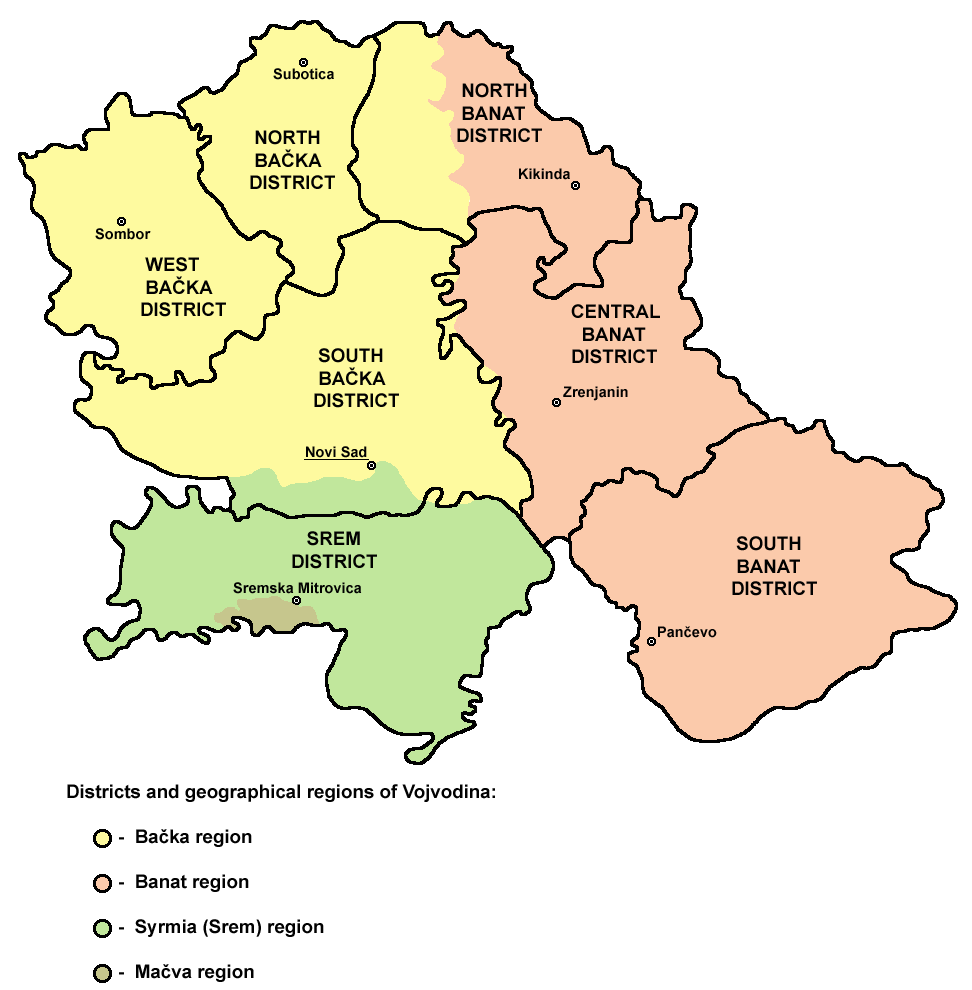
Serbian Bačka and districts within Vojvodina province

The administrative districts of Serbia in Bačka are:

- West Bačka
- North Bačka
- South Bačka

Note that municipalities of Sremski Karlovci, Petrovaradin, and Beočin and southern part of municipality of Bačka Palanka that belong to South Bačka District are geographically not located in Bačka, but in Syrmia, while municipalities of Ada, Senta, and Kanjiža which are geographically located in Bačka are part of North Banat District.

Geographic or traditional subregions or regions overlapping with Serbian Bačka include Gornji Breg, Podunavlje, Potisje, Šajkaška, Telečka, and Paorija.

=== Hungarian Bácska ===
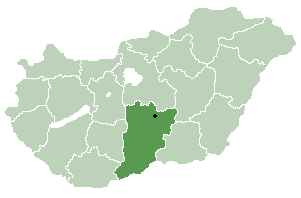
Bács-Kiskun County within Hungary

The Hungarian Bácska is mostly located in the Bács-Kiskun county of Hungary, while one small part of the region is located in the Baranya county.

Subregions in the Hungarian Bácska include (with population numbers):

- Baja: 76,906
- Bácsalmási: 18,578
- Jánoshalmai: 17,885

Note that parts of Hungarian Bácska also belong to the subregions of Kiskunhalasi and Mohácsi, although the main parts of those subregions are not located in Bácska.

== Demographics ==
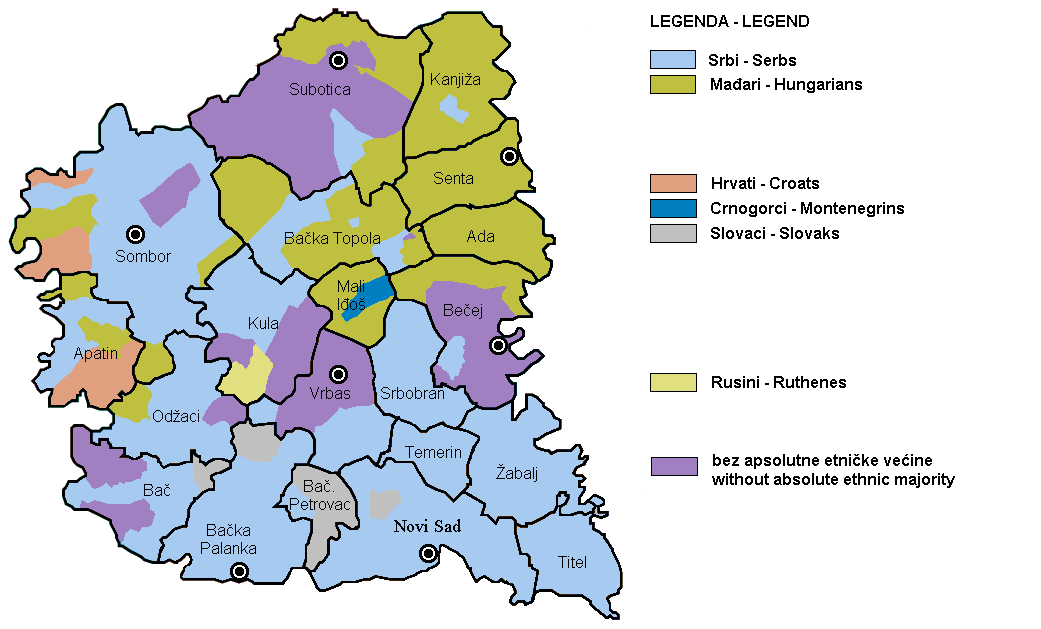
Ethnic map of Serbian Bačka, 2002

=== Serbia ===
According to the 2022 Serbian census, the population of the Serbian part of Bačka stood at 915,885.

Ethnic structure

- Serbs: 559,213 (61%)
- Hungarians: 143,259 (15.6%)
- Croats: 23,407 (2.5%)
- Slovaks: 20,023 (2.2%)
- Others (including Roma, Montenegrins, Bunjevci, Rusyns, etc.)

Cities and towns with over 10,000 inhabitants

- Novi Sad: 325,511 (Note: Population of the contiguous urban area including adjacent settlements of Petrovaradin, Sremska Kamenica, Veternik, and Futog; Petrovaradin and Sremska Kamenica are geographically part of Syrmia region.)
- Subotica: 88,752
- Sombor: 41,814
- Bačka Palanka: 25,476
- Vrbas: 20,892
- Temerin: 17,998
- Bečej: 19,492
- Kula: 14,873
- Apatin: 14,613
- Senta: 14,452
- Bačka Topola: 11,930
- Kać: 11,067
- Srbobran: 10,496

=== Hungary ===
According to the 2001 Hungarian census, the rough population of the Hungarian Bácska (including districts of Bajai, Bácsalmási, and Jánoshalmai) stood at 113,432. Note that administrative borders of the districts do not fully correspond with the geographical borders of Hungarian Bácska. Most of the inhabitants of Hungarian Bácska are ethnic Hungarians.

Towns with over 5,000 inhabitants:

- Baja: 38,143
- Jánoshalma: 9,866
- Bácsalmás: 7,694

== Gallery ==
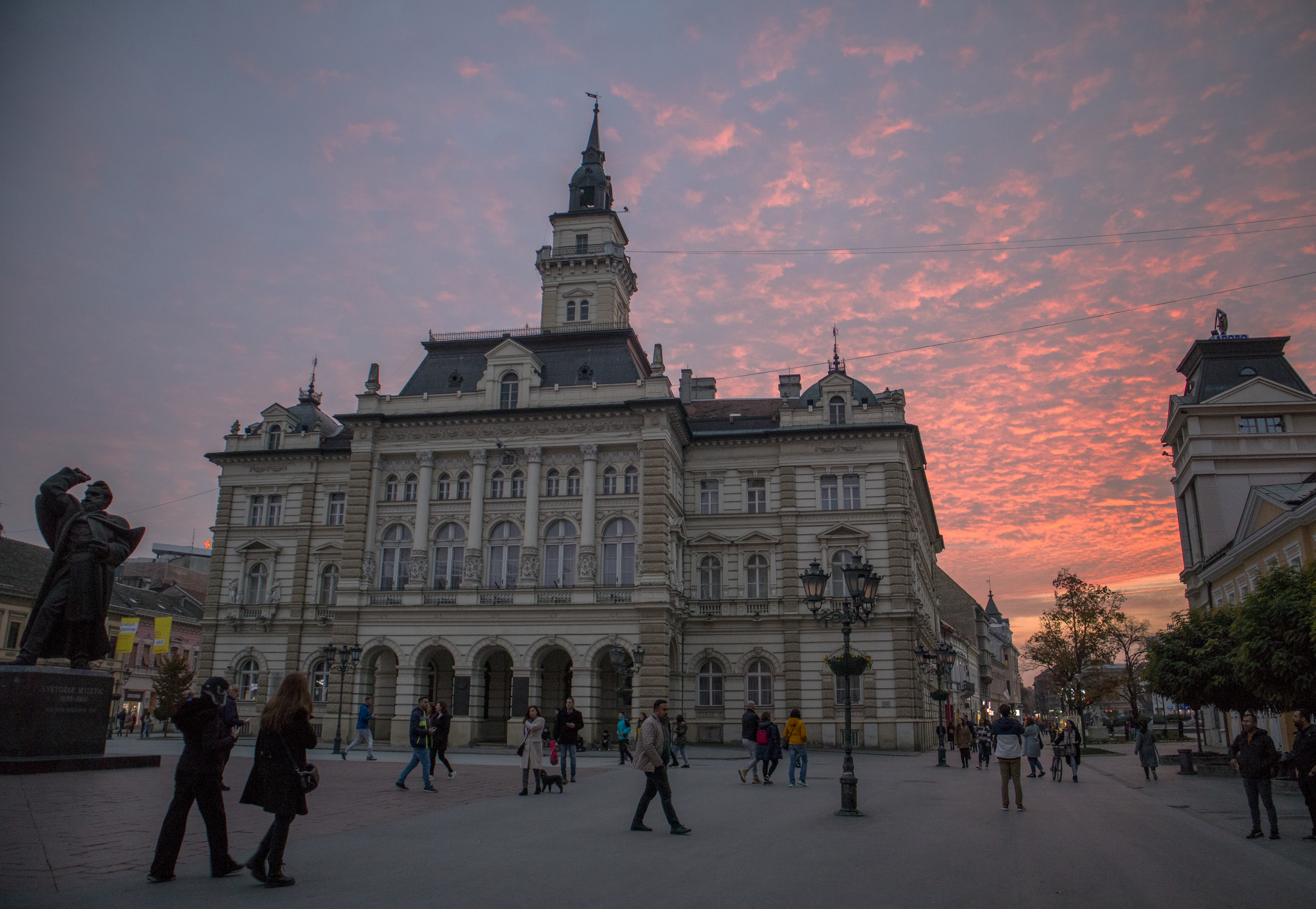
Novi Sad

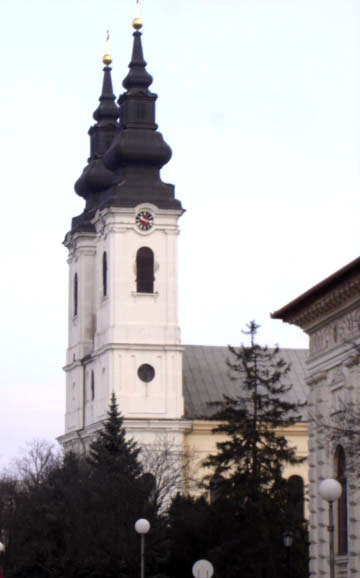
Srbobran

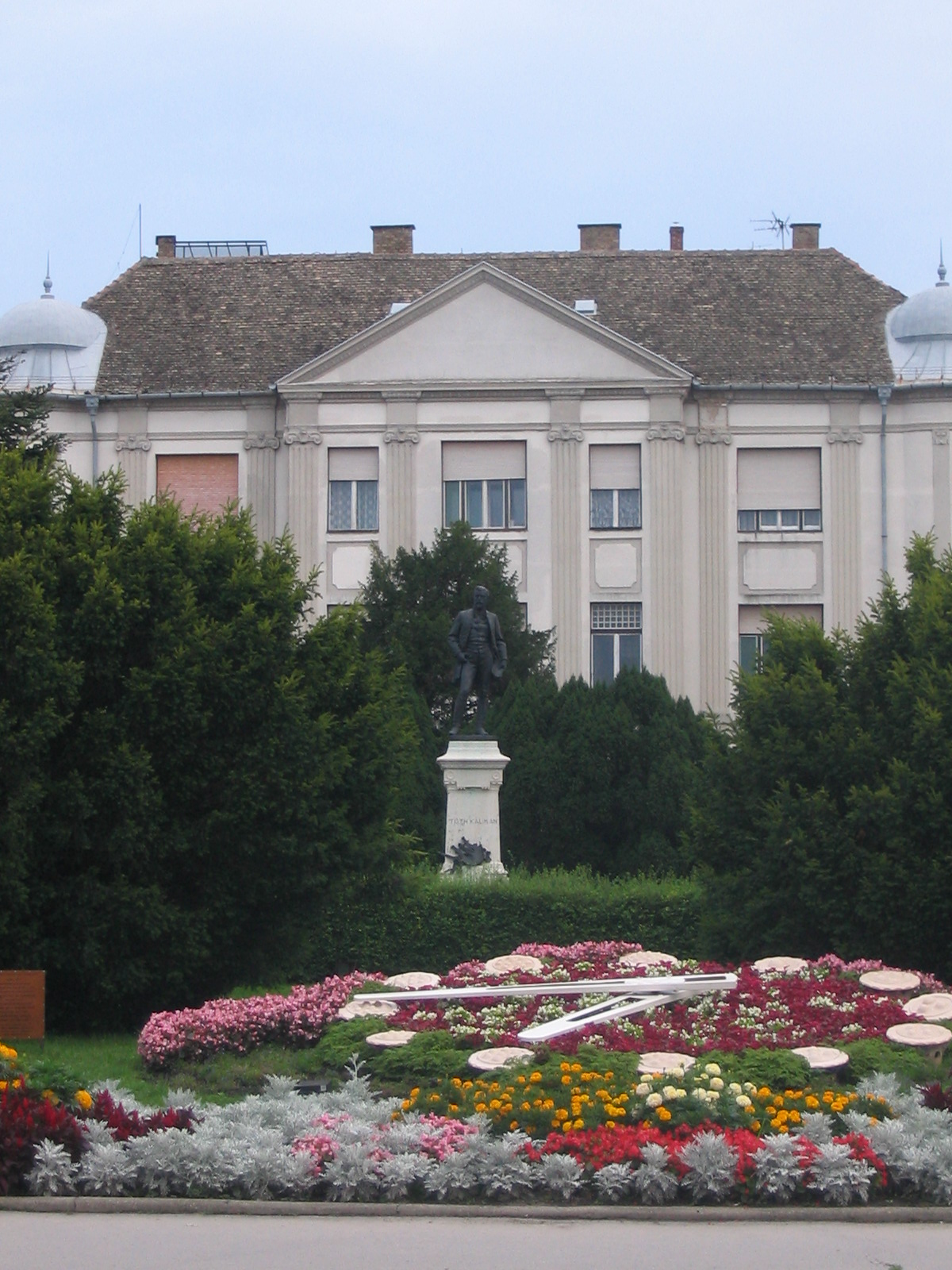
Baja

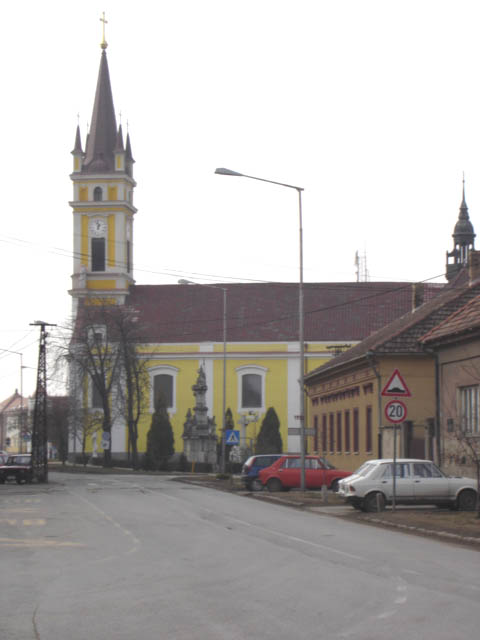
Kanjiža

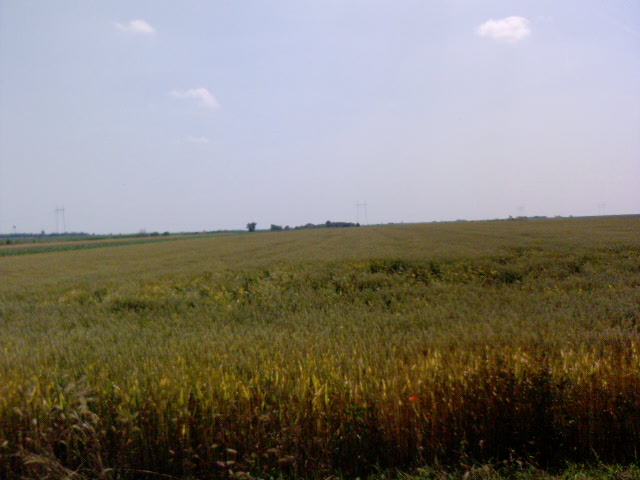
Wheat field near Temerin

== See also ==
- Bács-Bodrog
- Bács-Kiskun
- North Bačka District
- South Bačka District
- West Bačka District
- Eparchy of Bačka
- Bačka Oblast
- Banat, Bačka and Baranja
- List of regions of Serbia

== Sources ==
- Baán, István (1999). "The Metropolitanate of Tourkia: The Organization of the Byzantine Church in Hungary in the Middle Ages". Byzanz und Ostmitteleuropa 950-1453. Wiesbaden: Harrassowitz Verlag. pp. 45–53.
- Ćirković, Sima (2004). The Serbs. Malden: Blackwell Publishing. ISBN 9781405142915.
- Fodor, Pál; Dávid, Géza, eds. (2000). Ottomans, Hungarians, and Habsburgs in Central Europe: The Military Confines in the Era of Ottoman Conquest. BRILL. ISBN 9004119078.
- Gavrilović, Slavko (1993). "Serbs in Hungary, Slavonia and Croatia in struggles against the Turks (15th–18th centuries)". Serbs in European Civilization. Belgrade: Nova, Serbian Academy of Sciences and Arts, Institute for Balkan Studies. pp. 41–54.
- Georgiev, Pavel (2014). "The Abodriti-Praedenecenti between the Tisza and the Danube in the 9th Century" (PDF). Avars, Bulgars and Magyars on the Middle and Lower Danube. Budapest: Archaeolingua Foundation. pp. 107–124. Archived from the original on 25 April 2025.
- Kardaras, Georgios (2018). Byzantium and the Avars, 6th-9th Century AD: Political, Diplomatic and Cultural Relations. Leiden-Boston: Brill.
- Krizman, Bogdan (1970). "The Belgrade Armistice of 13 November 1918". The Slavonic and East European Review. 48 (110): 67–87.
- Scholz, Bernhard W., ed. (1970). Carolingian Chronicles: Royal Frankish Annals and Nithard's Histories. Ann Arbor, MI: University of Michigan Press.
- Sotirović, Vladislav B. (2011). "The Serbian Patriarchate of Peć in the Ottoman Empire: The First Phase (1557–94)" (PDF). Serbian Studies. 25 (2): 143–169. Archived from the original (PDF) on 10 August 2016.
- Točanac-Radović, Isidora (2022). "The Great Migration of Serbs and the Question of the Serbian Ethnic and Religious Community in the Habsburg Monarchy". Migrations in the Slavic Cultural Space: From the Middle Ages to the Present Day. Łódź: Łódź University Press. pp. 15–27.
