= Danube–Tisa–Danube Canal =

Serbian canal system

Coordinates: 44°49′35″N 21°20′09″E

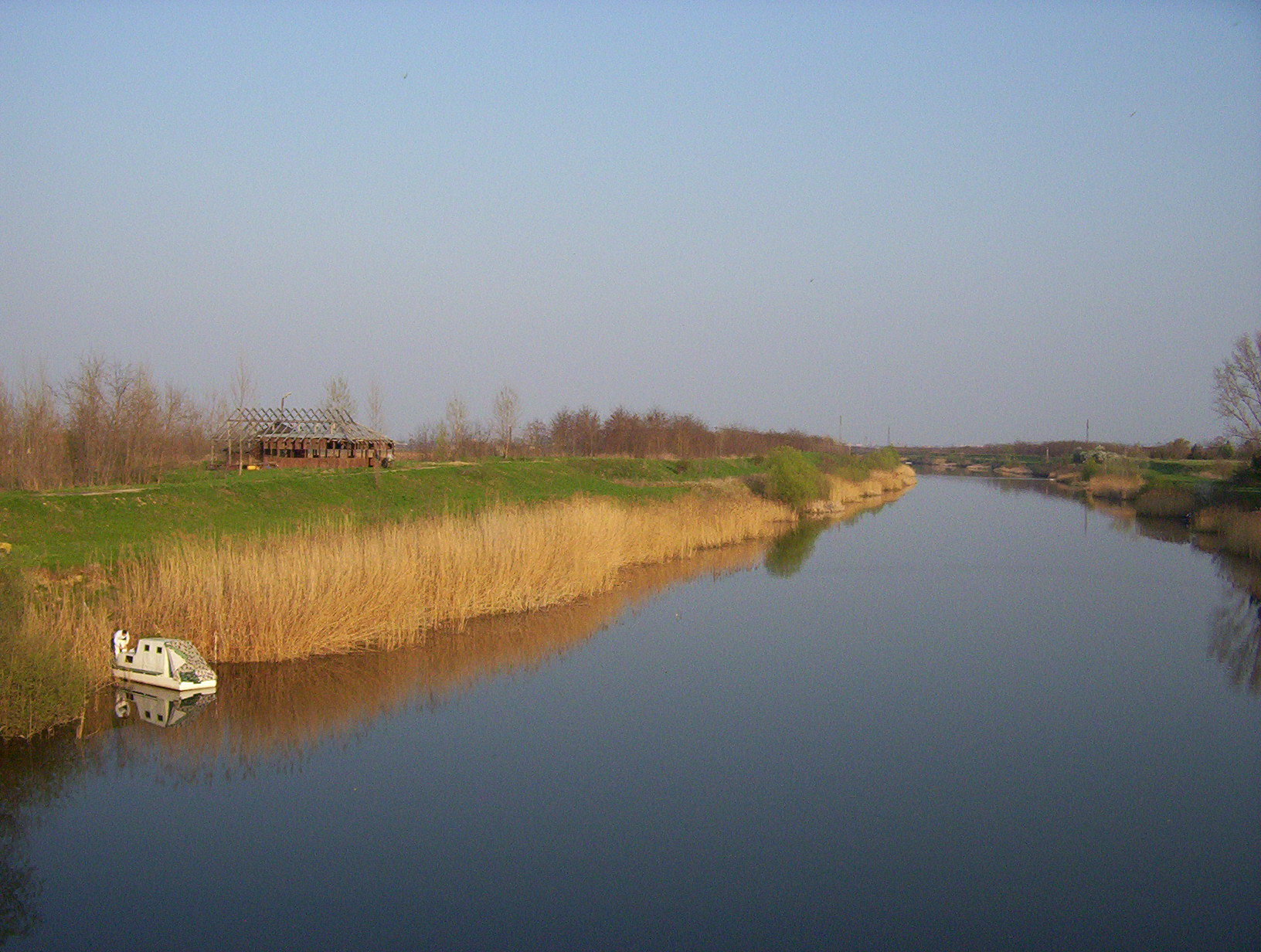
Little Bačka Canal near the village of Rumenka, close to Novi Sad

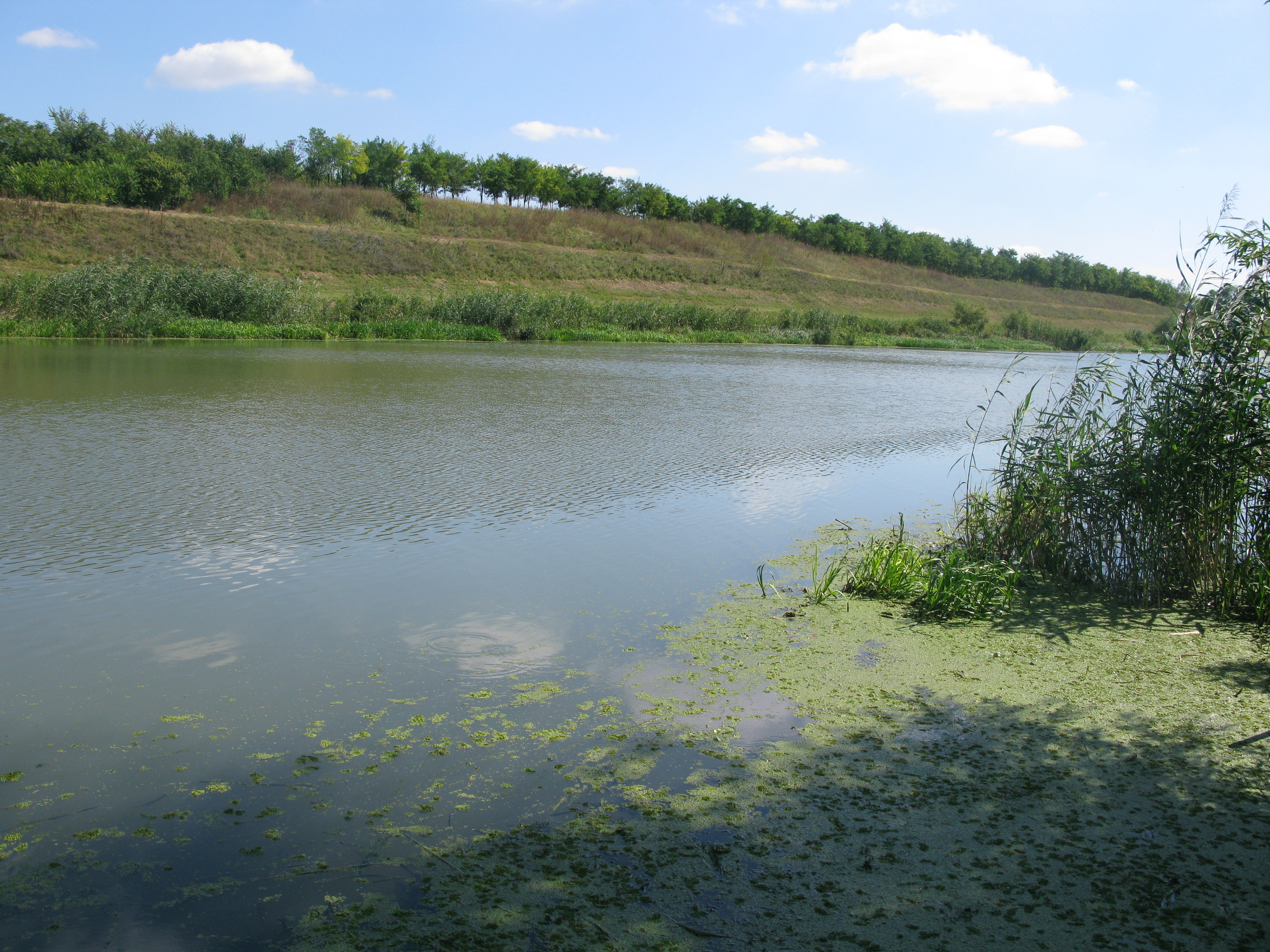
Danube-Tisa-Danube Canal at village Vlajkovac, close to Vršac.

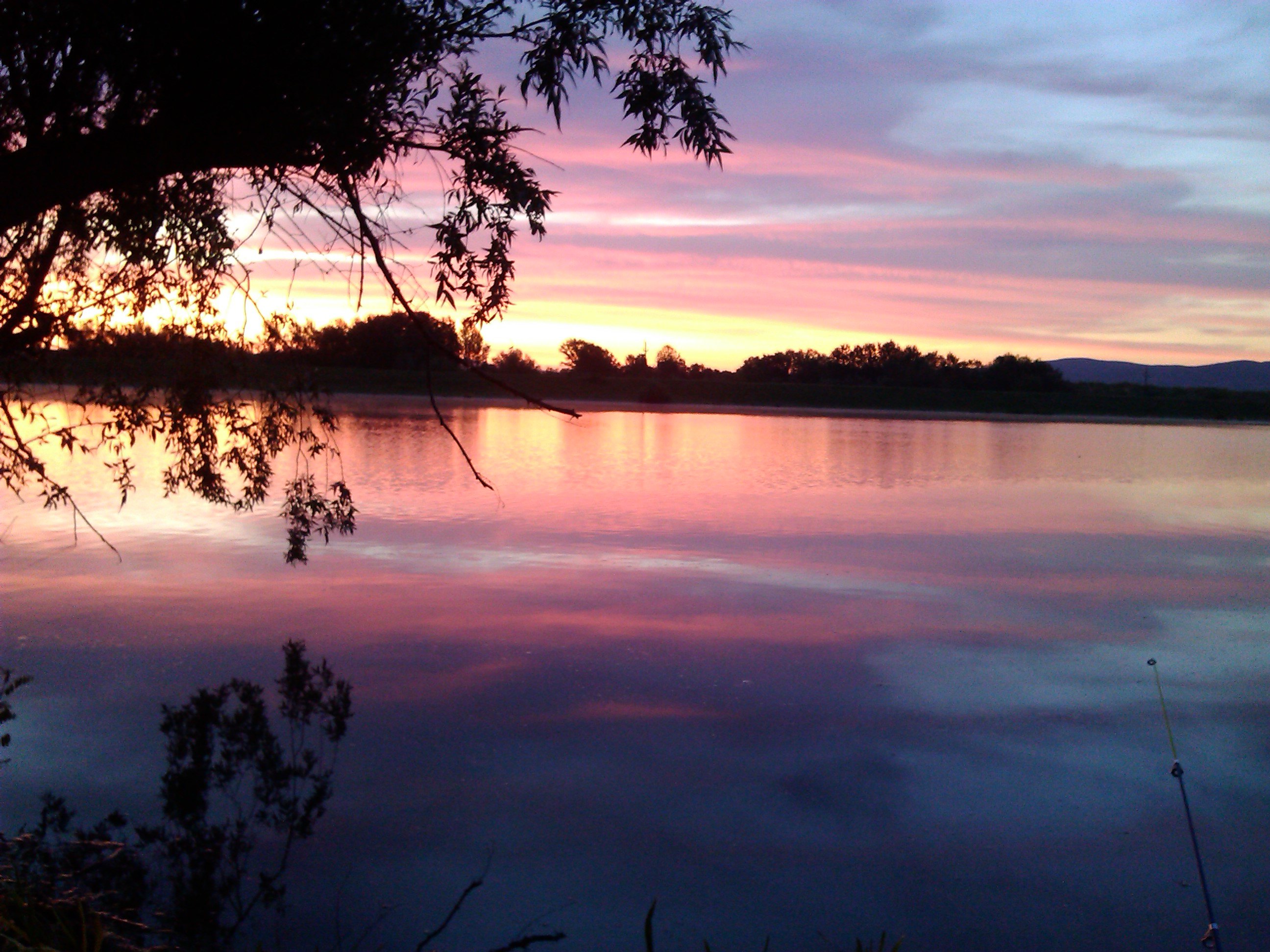
Danube-Tisa-Danube Canal at village Vračev Gaj, near the "Devil's bridge".

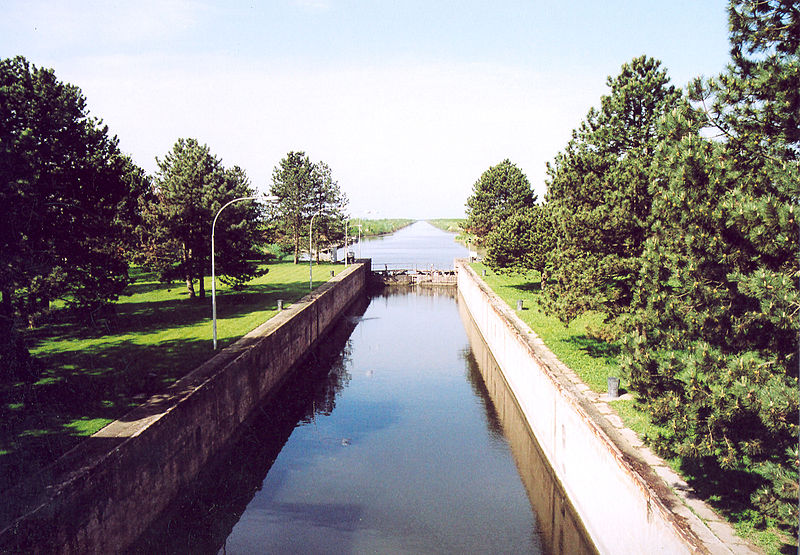
DTD Canal in Kucura.

Danube–Tisa–Danube Canal (DTD) (Serbian: Канал Дунав-Тиса-Дунав, romanized: Kanal Dunav-Tisa-Dunav) is a canal system in Serbia. It is a unique hydro-engineering system for flood control and hydrotechnical management, amelioration, forestry, water supply, waste water evacuation, navigation, tourism, fishing, hunting.

== Name ==
It was named after the two large rivers which it connects – the Danube and the Tisa. There are several other names used for the canal in other languages: Hungarian: Ferenc-csatorna; German: Donau-Theiß-Donau-Kanalsystem, etc.

== Geography ==
It covers the northern part of Serbia – the territory of Vojvodina (Bačka and Banat regions), with the total area of about 12,700 km^{2}. It consists of a number of canals, including:

- Great Bačka Canal
- Little Bačka Canal

== Characteristics ==
The total length of the dug main canals is 929 km, including new and old canals and streams which were completely or partially reconstructed and thus included in the new system. In the basic canal network there are 51 structures – 24 gates, 16 locks, five safety gates, six pumping stations, and 180 bridges. There are 14 cargo ports on the canals. On the new canals of the Danube-Tisa-Danube water system, 84 bridges were built – 62 carriageway, 19 railway and 3 pedestrian bridges. One of the most important structures within this water system is the dam on the river Tisa near Novi Bečej which regulates the water regime in the basic canal network in Banat, for irrigation of about 3,000 km^{2}.

== History ==
Historically the channel is called Franz Channel, after emperor Franz II. He was the Emperor of Austria as its construction started in the time when Hungary was part of the Habsburg monarchy. Even the emperor visited the construction site. The smaller channel that starts from Stapar and goes to Novi Bečej was called Franz Joseph Channel.

The dam is based on the plans of Albert Hainz, who was the technical director of the channel. The dam was constructed between 1895 and 1899. István Türr participated in the compilation and implementation of the plans. The dam locks are powered by electricity. The electrical power required for operation is provided by the lock-built hydroelectric power generator. According to the official records, delegations arrived from as far as Japan for the inauguration ceremony. At the time of its construction, it was one of the most sophisticated dam-locks in the world.
