= Great Bačka Canal =

Waterway in Serbia

Coordinates: 45.6049°N 20.0563°E

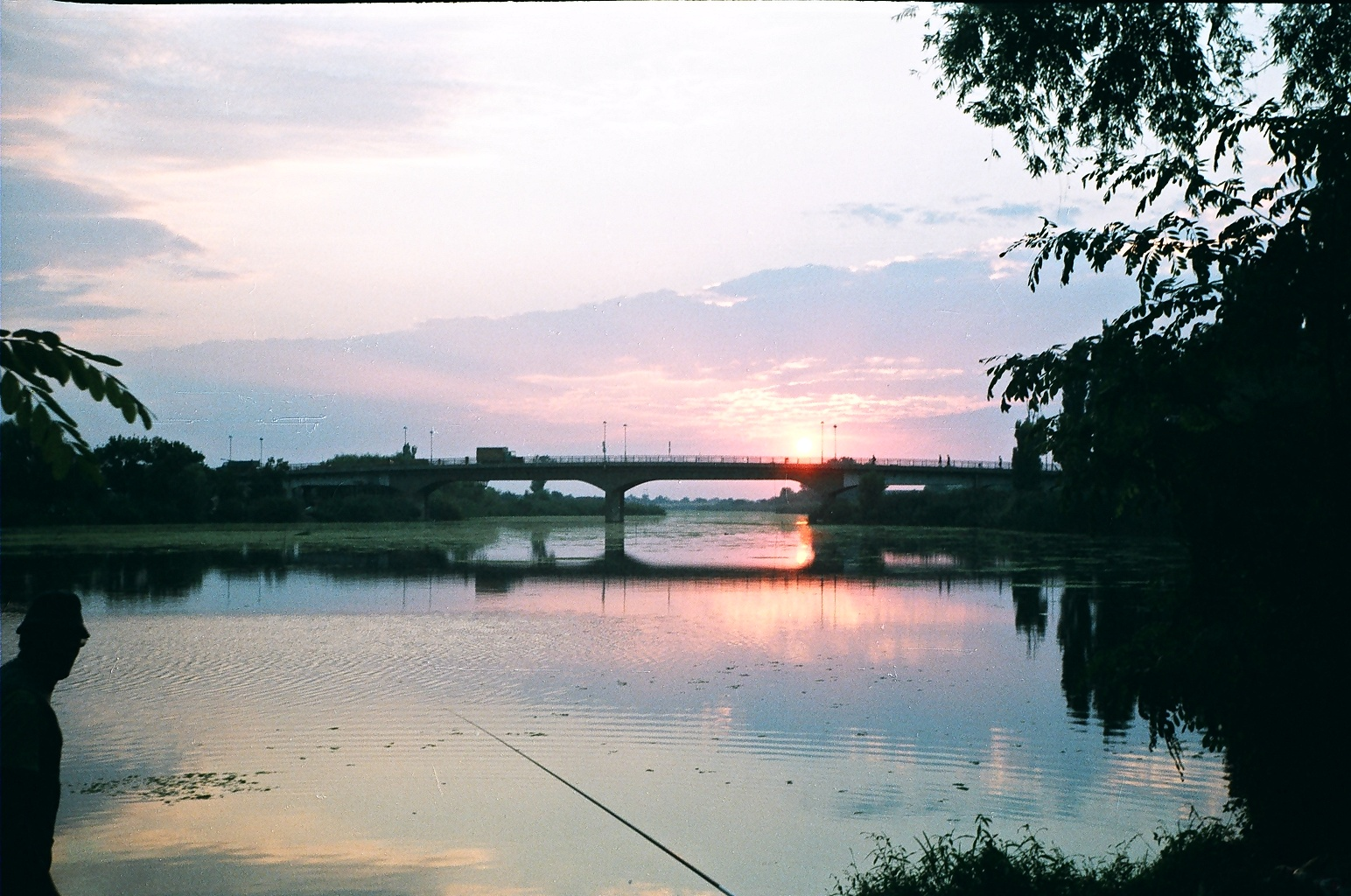
Bridge across Great Bačka Canal in Srbobran.

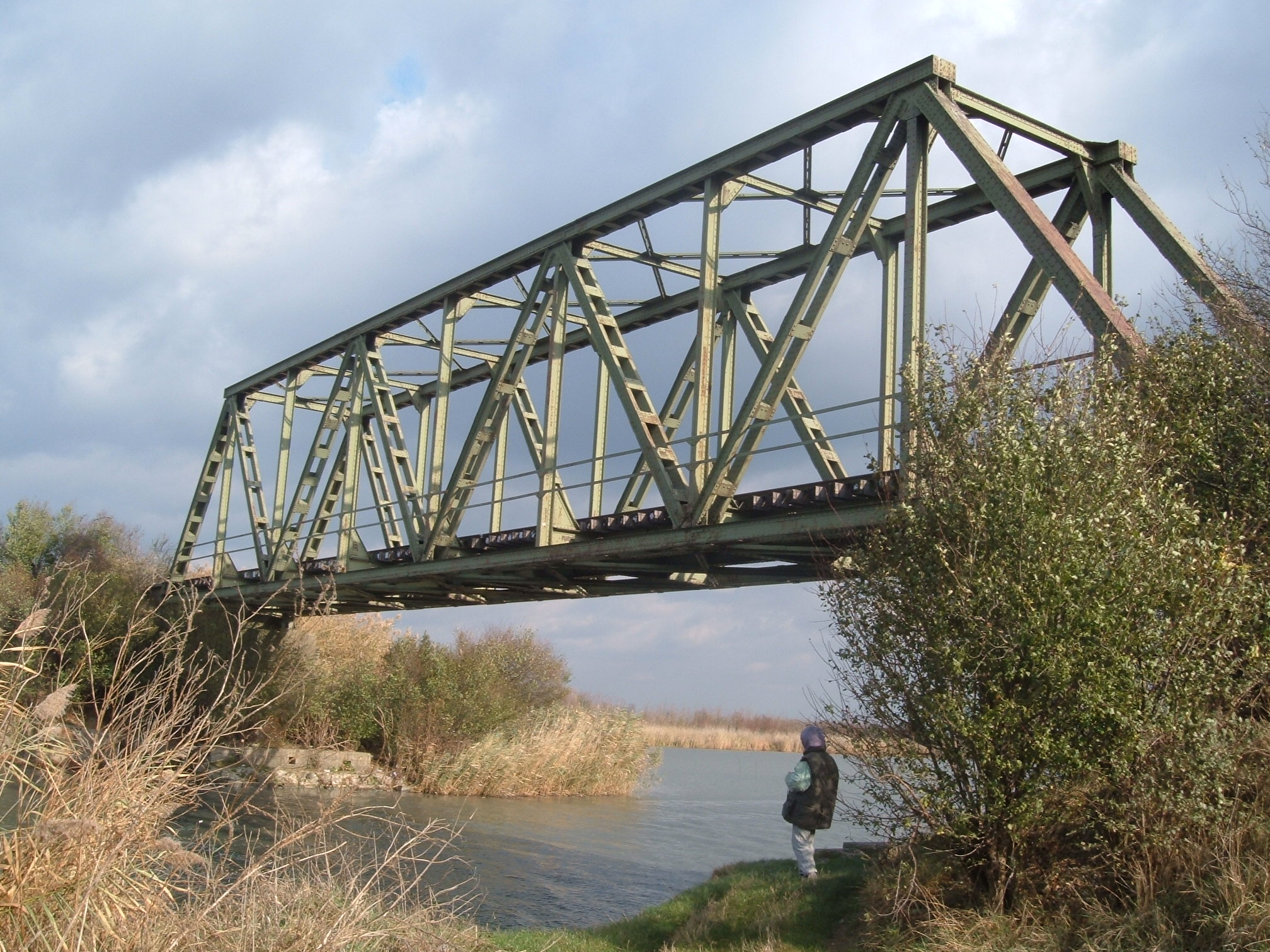
Old railway bridge across Great BačkaCanal near Nadalj.

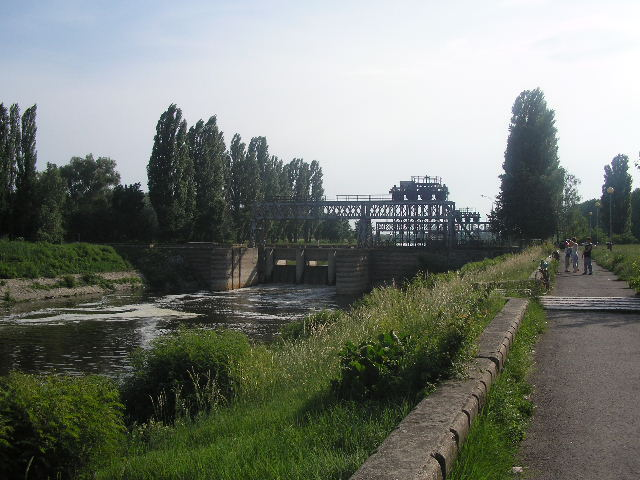
István Türr Sluice near Bečej that connects Great Bačka Canal and the Tisa

Great Bačka Canal (Serbian: Велики бачки канал/Veliki bački kanal; Hungarian: Ferenc-csatorna) is a canal in Serbia which runs from Bezdan (on the Danube) to Bečej (on the Tisa). The canal is 118 km (73 mi) long and part of the Danube-Tisa-Danube Canal system. The excavation works of Great Bačka Canal began in 1794 and went on until 1801 in Bács-Bodrog County, Kingdom of Hungary. The bed of the canal is 17 m (56 ft) wide and 25 m (82 ft) wide at the top. The average depth is 3 m (9.8 ft). The water of the canal is very polluted because it runs through industrial town Vrbas. Where the pollution is still unresolved. Crvenka and Kula waters are clear, and used for swimming and boat rides.

The canal in Vrbas, not only is too small for navigation, but is also dangerous to bathe in due to the long-lasting pollution problem. The ministry of protection of environment of Serbia included it in the list of the country's "three black points". The pollution of the canal began in the second half of the 20th century. According to a number of researchers, the canal is considered one of the most polluted reservoirs in Europe and poses a threat to human health among the people living in nearby settlements. At the bottom of the canal there is up to 400,000 tons of silt which contains heavy metals and oil waste which also reach the rivers connected by the channel: the Danube and the Tisa. In 2008 the minister of environmental protection signed the Memorandum of canal cleaning.

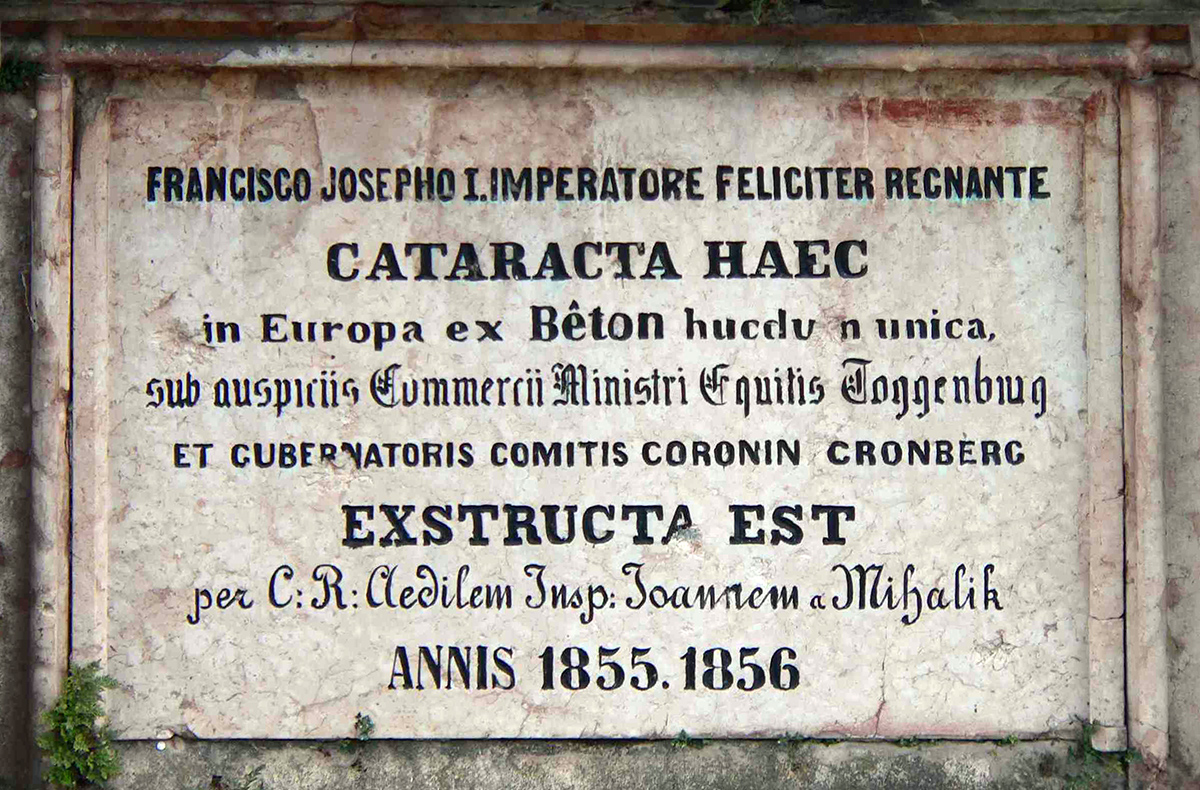
Monument at Bezda-lock-gate

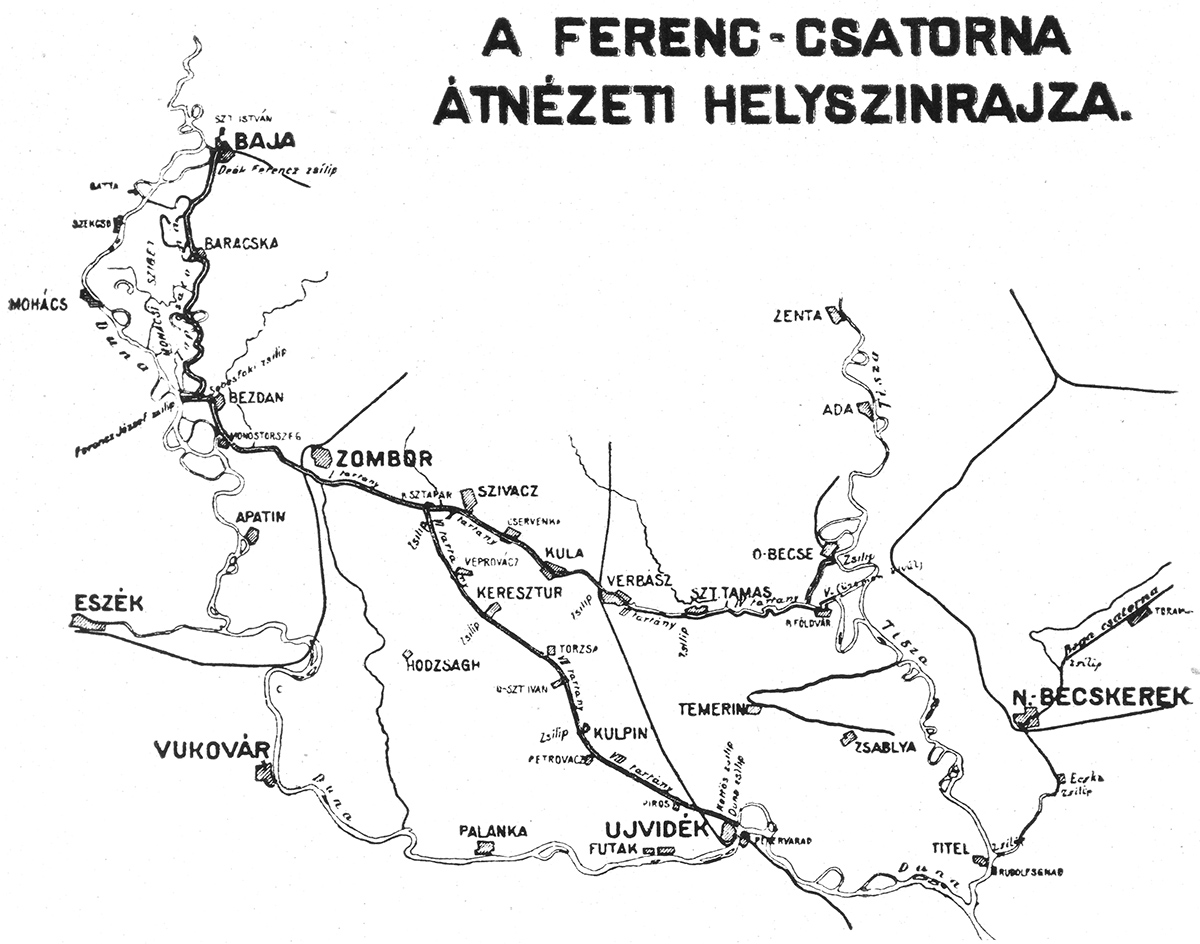
Plan of the Franz Canal from the 19th century

== See also ==
- Little Bačka Canal
- Danube-Tisa-Danube Canal
- List of most-polluted rivers
