= Little Bačka Canal =

Canal in Serbia

Coordinates: 45.2672°N 19.8675°E

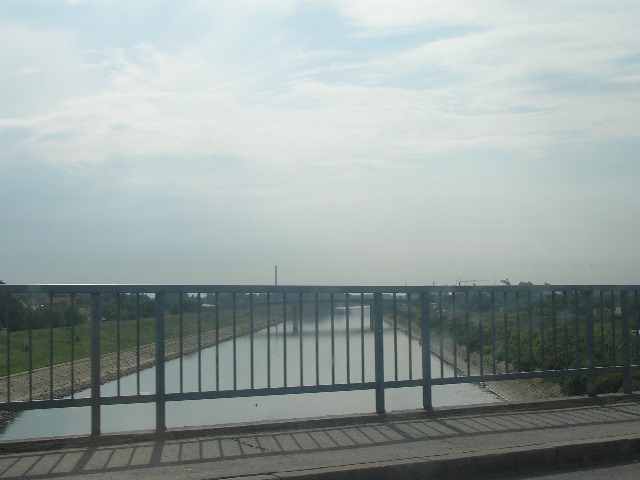
Little Bačka Canal in Novi Sad

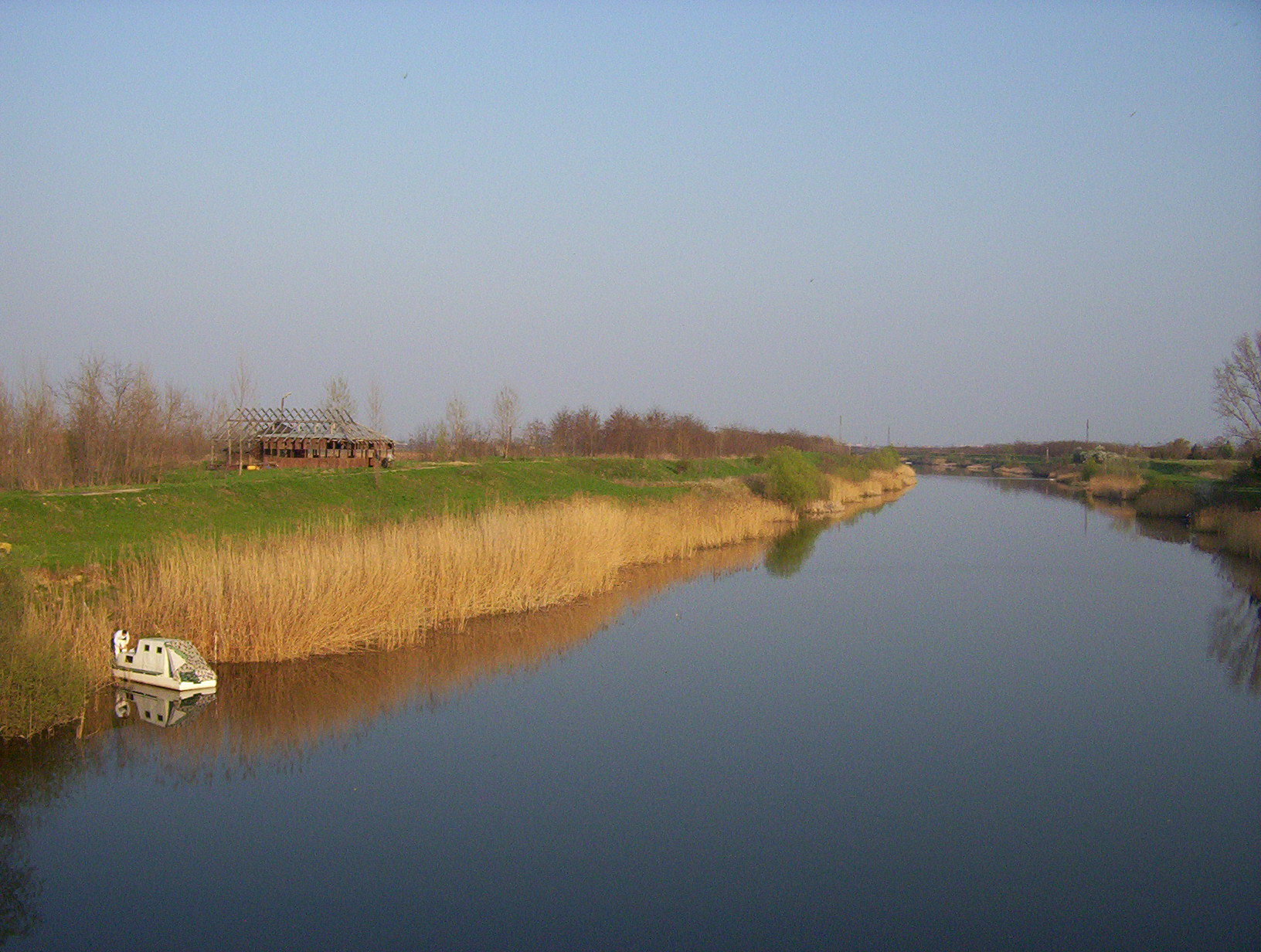
Little Bačka Canal near Rumenka

Little Bačka Canal (Serbian: Мали бачки канал/Mali bački kanal), (Hungarian: Ferenc József-csatorna) is a canal in Serbia which runs from Mali Stapar (on Great Bačka Canal) to Novi Sad (on Danube). The canal is 66 km long and it is part of Danube-Tisa-Danube Canal system. The canal shortens waterway from Bezdan to Novi Sad by 75 km. Little Bačka Canal has 4 sluices. In the past, the canal was named after emperor Franz Josef (during Austrian rule) and king Alexander (during Kingdom of Yugoslavia).

== See also ==
- Great Bačka Canal
- Danube-Tisa-Danube Canal
