= Millerand letter =

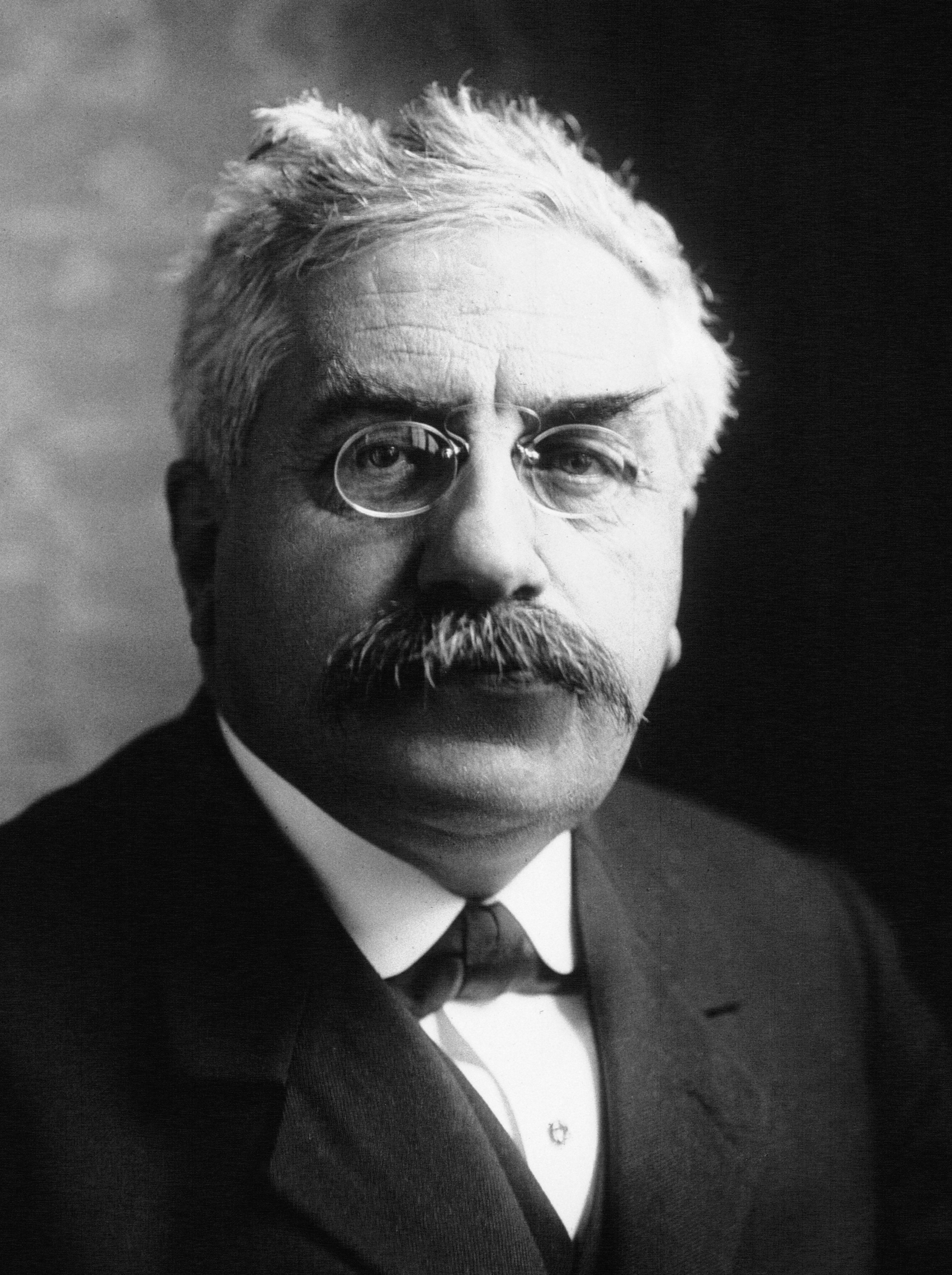
Alexandre Millerand (1859-1943) in 1914

The Alexandre Millerand Letter was written by French Prime Minister Alexandre Millerand and was an annex to the Trianon Treaty. It stated that the border amendments made by the Trianon Treaty were not final, and could be reviewed in the future. This gave the Hungarian government the false impression that the treaty itself was only temporary, and so the delegation signed the treaty on June 4, 1920.

== Background ==
On March 8, 1920, the Council of Foreign Ministers and Ambassadors, whose chairman was Alexandre Millerand, discussed the new borders of Hungary for the last time in London. David Lloyd George questioned the viability of such border modifications, but Philippe Berthelot refused any last-minute adjustment. As a compromise, the council produced the Millerand letter as an annex to the treaty.

The letter stated that the border issue would be a matter for the boundary committees to decide "in accordance with the same conditions".

It also stated, "Examinations are to be done locally, and in some cases, it might be necessary to move the borders stated in the treaty... if the border committees ... come to the conclusion... that the declarations of the treaty are unfair, then they will have the possibility to report it to the Council of the League of Nations. In that case, the Entente Powers agree to that on request to one party involved, the League of Nations will offer its services to retain the original border, with the same conditions, in a peaceful way in locations that the Council decides".

== Aftermath ==
The consequences of the letter were adverse for Hungary by feeding Hungarian revisionism and helping the signing and the ratification of the treaty in Hungary, the United Kingdom and France.

Léon Blum, a politician in the French Socialist Party, stated in the party newspaper Le Populaire that the cost for Millerand's would be to rent the Hungarian State Railways to a French investment fund. It also stated that if the railway was controlled by the fund, Millerand would modify the borders for Hungary.

Millerand did not respond to that allegation, which cannot be verified. However, Millerand failed to do anything for Hungary afterward.

The Trianon borders were later revised during the Munich Agreement (1938) the First Vienna Award (1938), the Second Vienna Award (1940) and the reconquest of areas from Yugoslavia (1941). All of those modifications were undone in 1947 to the Trianon Treaty.

== See also ==
- Historical revisionism (negationism)
- Greater Hungary
- Little Entente
