= Treaty of Trianon =

1920 peace treaty on Hungary after World War I

Treaty of Peace between the Allied and Associated Powers and Hungary
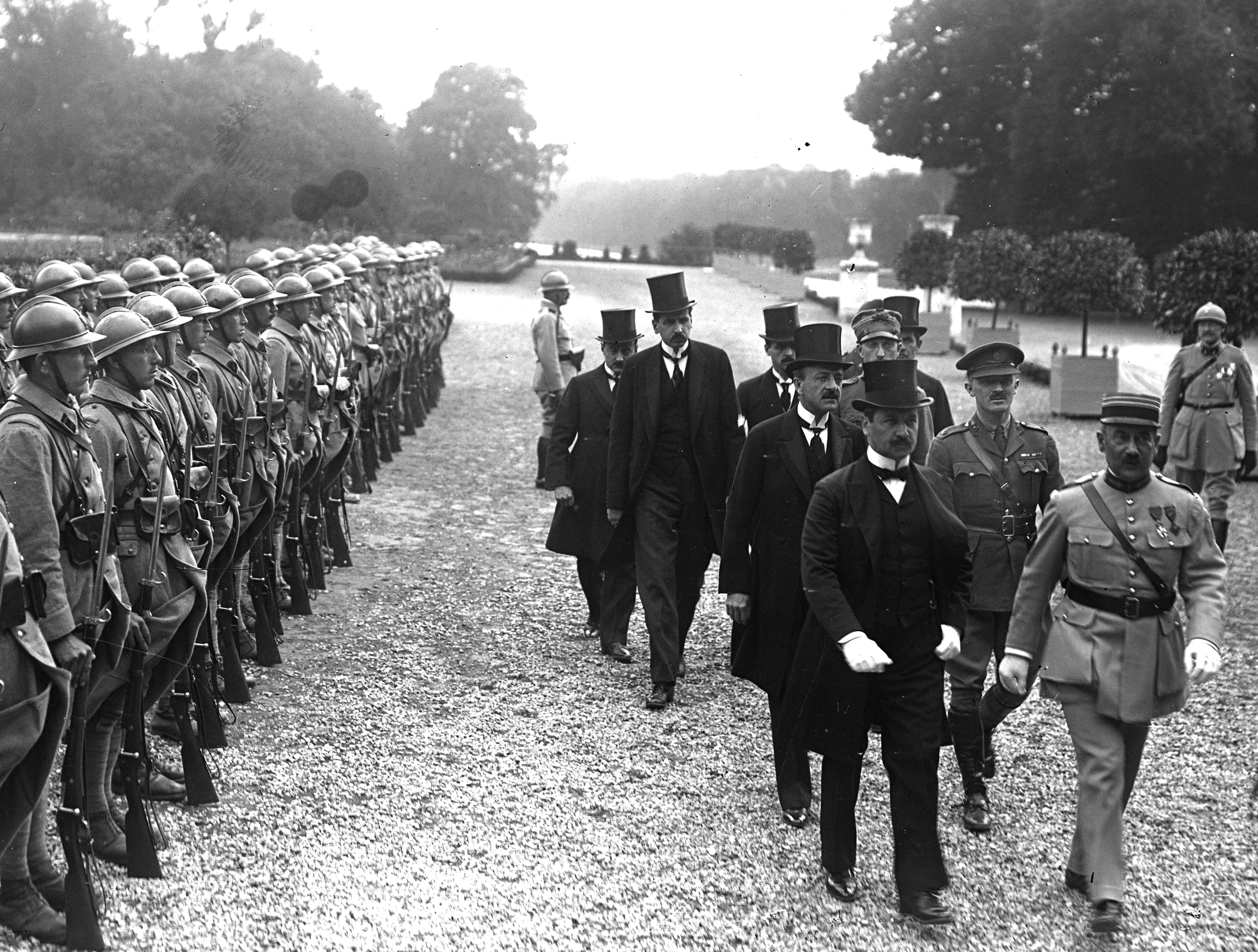
- Arrival of the two Hungarian signatories, Ágost Benárd and Alfréd Drasche-Lázár, on 4 June 1920 at the Grand Trianon in Versailles
- Signed: 4 June 1920
- Location: Grand Trianon, Versailles, France
- Effective: 26 July 1921
- Parties: Principal Allied and Associated Powers: Principal Allied and Associated Powers; United States (Note: The United States ended its state of war with the U.S.–Hungarian Peace Treaty (1921).); British Empire; • United Kingdom; • Canada; • Australia; • New Zealand; • South Africa; • India; France; Italy; Japan; Allied and Associated Powers: Belgium; (Republic of China (1912–1949)) China; Cuba; Greece; Nicaragua; Panama; Poland; Portugal; Romania; Kingdom of Serbs, Croats and Slovenes; Siam; Czechoslovakia; Central Power; Hungary
- Depositary: French Government
- Languages: French, English, Italian

Full text
- Treaty of Trianon at Wikisource

President Mihály Károlyi's speech after the proclamation of the First Hungarian Republic on 16 November 1918

Béla Linder's pacifist speech for military officers, and declaration of Hungarian self-disarmament on 2 November 1918.

Protest of the Transylvanian National Council against the occupation of Transylvania by Romania on 22 December 1918

Newsreel about Treaty of Trianon, 1920

The Treaty of Trianon (French: Traité de Trianon; Hungarian: Trianoni békediktátum; Italian: Trattato del Trianon; Romanian: Tratatul de la Trianon), often referred to in Hungary as the Peace Dictate of Trianon or Dictate of Trianon, was prepared at the Paris Peace Conference. It was signed in the Grand Trianon at Versailles on 4 June 1920, and formally terminated World War I between most of the Allies of World War I and the Kingdom of Hungary. The treaty is known for the territorial changes imposed on Hungary and recognition of its new borders after World War I.

As part of the Austro-Hungarian Empire, Hungary had been involved in World War I since August 1914. After its allies signed armistices with the Entente, the political elite in Budapest also opted to end the war. On 31 October 1918, the Budapest government declared independence of Hungary from Austria and began peace talks with the Allies which led to an armistice on 13 November 1918. Hungary demobilised its army and granted the Allies the right to occupy the country's south and east until a peace treaty was signed. In December 1918, Budapest allowed Czechoslovak troops to occupy the country's north. In exchange, Budapest hoped to reopen trade and a supply of coal. Despite the end of hostilities, Hungary's neighbours Czechoslovakia, Romania, and The Kingdom of Serbs, Croats, and Slovenes blockaded the country, preventing it from importing food, fuel, and other important goods. Successive Hungarian governments pleaded with the Entente to lift the blockade. In April 1919, Romania and Czechoslovakia moved their armies further into Hungary, provoking a renewal of hostilities. In June, the Entente ordered them to cease fighting and accept new demarcation lines that would be guaranteed as the future borders of Hungary. Romania ignored the order, however the Entente orchestrated the formation of a new government which was invited to attend the Paris Peace Conference. The treaty, received in January 1920, legalized the existing demarcation lines as the new borders, guaranteed the end of the blockade and restoration of trade between the former Habsburg lands, as well as importing of coal into Hungary.

The treaty was dictated by the Allies rather than negotiated, and Hungary faced a decision to accept or reject it in full. The Hungarian delegation signed the treaty under protest; agitation for its revision began immediately. While the government in Budapest welcomed the restoration of peace and trade, it continued to protest the cession of its former territories without plebiscites. The treaty was signed on 4 June 1920, ratified by Hungary on 16 November 1920 and came into force on 26 July 1921. The boundaries of Hungary have remained mostly the same since then, with minor modifications in 1921–24 and 1947, excepting the short-lived aggrandizement that Hungary undertook in 1938–1941. One of the treaty's elements was the "self-determination of peoples" doctrine, an attempt to give non-Hungarians of the former empire their own states. However, the Allies refused to organise plebiscites as the basis for drawing new borders which they explained in the Millerand letter accompanying the treaty. The letter explained that the lack of plebiscites was due to the belief that "a popular consultation ... would not produce significantly different results". The letter suggested that the Council of the League of Nations might offer its mediation to rectify the new borders amicably if suggested by the delimitation commission. Hungarian diplomats pointed to the letter as a Great Powers promise of territorial revisions in favour of Hungary. In 1921, one plebiscite was permitted settling a small territorial dispute between the First Austrian Republic and Kingdom of Hungary.

The post-1920 Hungary became a landlocked state of 93,073 square kilometres (35,936 sq mi) and 7.6 million people, 28% of the land and 36% of the population in the pre-war Kingdom of Hungary. The areas allocated to neighbouring countries had 3.3 million Hungarians which became minorities in the new jurisdictions. The treaty limited Hungary's army to 35,000 men, and the Austro-Hungarian Navy ceased to exist. It required Hungary to pay war reparations to its neighbours. These decisions and their consequences have caused resentment in Hungary ever since. Hungary's neighbours were the treaty's primary beneficiaries. The treaty led to international recognition of Hungary, and its sovereignty while granting Hungarian citizens abroad right of protection of their property from nationalization.

== Background ==
=== First World War and Austro-Hungarian Armistice ===
On 28 June 1914, the heir to the throne of Austria-Hungary, the Archduke Franz Ferdinand of Austria, was assassinated by a Serbian nationalist. This caused a rapidly escalating July Crisis resulting in Austria-Hungary declaring war on Serbia, followed quickly by the entry of most European powers into the First World War. Two alliances faced off, the Central Powers (led by Germany) and the Triple Entente (led by Britain, France and Russia). In 1918 Germany tried to overwhelm the Allies on the Western Front but failed. Instead the Allies began a successful counteroffensive and forced the Armistice of 11 November 1918 that resembled a surrender by the Central Powers.

On 6 April 1917, the United States entered the war against Germany and in December 1917 against Austria-Hungary. The American war aim was to end aggressive militarism as shown by Berlin and Vienna; the United States never formally joined the Allies. President Woodrow Wilson acted as an independent force, and his Fourteen Points were accepted by Germany as a basis for the armistice of November 1918. It outlined a policy of free trade, open agreements, and democracy. While the term was not used, self-determination was assumed. It called for a negotiated end to the war, international disarmament, the withdrawal of the Central Powers from occupied territories, the creation of a Polish state, the redrawing of Europe's borders along ethnic lines, and the formation of a League of Nations to guarantee the political independence and territorial integrity of all states. It called for a just and democratic peace uncompromised by territorial annexation. Point ten announced Wilson's "wish" that the peoples of Austria-Hungary be given autonomy—a point that Vienna rejected.

The Hungarian Parliament, led by Prime Minister Sándor Wekerle, agreed to the proposal to discuss peace on the basis of Wilson's Fourteen Points. At the same time, it declared that the problem of non-Hungarian nations in Hungary was an internal matter for the state. Wekerle refused to publicly admit that the war was lost. Responding to that, Count Mihály Károlyi said that "We have lost the war. Now the main thing is not to lose the peace" and called for a democratic Hungary to conclude the most advantageous peace with the Entente. Count István Tisza responded that although Károlyi was right that the war was lost, Hungary did not need further democratisation during wartime. The only important task was to preserve the territorial integrity of Hungary, which Tisza claimed did not go against Wilson's points. (Tisza was bitterly unpopular among ethnic Hungarian voters and therefore his party National Party of Work drew most of his votes from ethnic minorities during the parliamentary elections.) The non-Hungarian ethnic groups of Hungary would receive only small concession. The sole Slovak member of the parliament, Ferdinand Juriga, opened his speech by denying the right of the Hungarian parliament to speak or act in the name of the Slovaks, declared that only the Slovak National Council had the right to represent Slovaks at the peace conference and demanded the right to self-determination for all nations of Hungary. The Hungarian parliament erupted in anger, shouting, "Where is this council!? Where is the Slovak nation!? What county does it live in!? Who is this really!? Stop him speaking!!"

On 18 October Woodrow Wilson responded to the peace offer of the Austro-Hungarian Monarchy, burying the hope that federalization would preserve its territorial integrity. Wilson emphasized that since his Fourteen Points on 8 January the situation has changed, that the USA has recognized the Czechoslovak National Council in Paris as a de facto government, and that the "oppressed nations of Austria-Hungary will themselves assess what will satisfy their aspirations and their rights". In his last political speech to the Hungarian parliament, Tisza bitterly complained about how the Entente powers "negotiated with the internal enemies of the state" which meant that now he was forced to enter talks with "the phantasmagoria of a Czechoslovak state". Wekerle responded that they will negotiate with them "only if they first give up on the idea of turning Hungary into Eastern Switzerland". Wekerle promised the parliament that they will tell Wilson that "we know of no Czechoslovak union, only of a Czech union". The Hungarian government agreed to begin negotiations with the nationalities, promise them some minor concessions and if these were not accepted, they would hold a plebiscite and make sure its resolution was favorable to Hungarians and the integrity of Hungary. They would inform President Wilson of the results and the conditions for peace would be fulfilled. Only a minority of Hungarian politicians, led by Mihály Károlyi, sought preservation in the democratisation of the semi-feudal kingdom, which still lacked universal suffrage. (Similar to Hungary, the most Western European countries did not have universal suffrage before the end of WW1. The UK introduced universal suffrage after WWI with the Representation of the People Act 1918). All feudal privileges of the Hungarian nobility was erased by the April Laws of 1848.

Germany, the major ally of Austria-Hungary in World War I, suffered numerous losses during the Hundred Days Offensive between August and November 1918 and was in negotiation of armistice with Allied Powers from the beginning of October 1918. Between 15 and 29 September 1918, Franchet d'Espèrey, in command of a relative small army of Greeks (9 divisions), French (6 divisions), Serbs (6 divisions), British (4 divisions) and Italians (1 division), staged a successful Vardar offensive in Vardar Macedonia that ended by taking Bulgaria out of the war. That collapse of the Southern (Italian) Front was one of several developments that effectively triggered the November 1918 armistice. By the end of October 1918, the Austro-Hungarian Army was so fatigued that its commanders were forced to seek a ceasefire. Czechoslovakia and the State of Slovenes, Croats and Serbs were proclaimed, and troops started deserting, disobeying orders and retreating. Many Czechoslovak troops, in fact, started working for the Allied cause, and in September 1918, five Czechoslovak Regiments were formed in the Italian Army. The launch of an offensive by 51 Entente divisions along the whole Italian front on 24 October 1918 lead to the destruction of the Austro-Hungarian army. The troops of Austria-Hungary started a chaotic withdrawal during the Battle of Vittorio Veneto, and Austria-Hungary began to negotiate a truce on 28 October, which they signed at Padua on 3 November 1918.

The Hungarian Parliament dissolved on 23 October after learning of a revolution in Rijeka, Croatia, where the 79th Infantry regiment rebelled and occupied the town. Fearing the spread of revolution from Croatia to Hungary, Prime Minister Wekerle resigned under pressure.

=== Aster Revolution and the First Hungarian Republic ===
During the war, Count Mihály Károlyi led a small but very active pacifist anti-war maverick faction in the Hungarian parliament. He even organized covert contacts with British and French diplomats in Switzerland. On 25 October 1918 Károlyi had formed the Hungarian National Council. The Austro-Hungarian monarchy politically collapsed and disintegrated as a result of a defeat in the Italian front. On 31 October 1918, in the midst of armistice negotiations, the Aster Revolution erupted and Charles IV King of Hungary appointed the liberal Károlyi as prime minister. The revolution in Budapest occurred in parallel to the disintegration of the Austria-Hungary trade network. The heaviest blow to the government was caused by the stop of coal imports from Silesia, which assured the functioning of most of transport, industry and heating in cities. By 5 November, Károlyi learnt that the national coal stocks would be empty in 2 days. The energy crisis in Hungary, caused by a shortage of coal, weakened the Budapest government to such an extent that it felt compelled to seek a compromise with Czechoslovakia, which was blocking the coal road to Silesia.

The collapse of the Austro-Hungarian army on the Italian front also affected the rear units in Hungary. By the beginning of November 1918, the collapsing statehood was experiencing "disturbances" or "looting". On the 1st of November, the pacifist and pro-Entente Károlyi's new Hungarian government decided to recall all of the troops, who were conscripted from the territory of Kingdom of Hungary, which was a major blow for the Habsburg's armies. Károlyi's new government insisted on preserving the historic borders of Hungary, but it was in no position to comply with the urgent demands for forcible intervention, demanded by military commanders. Károlyi intended to conclude an armistice independently in the name of Hungary, without regard for its German and Austrian allies. By this, alongside his pacifist views, he sought to distance Hungary from those mainly responsible for the war, and convince the victorious Entente that his government already represented a democratic country, and so should not be punished for the warlike actions of preceding governments, as Slovak historian Marián Hronský considered.

=== Unilaterial self-disarmament of the Hungarian army ===
Károlyi yielded to President Wilson's demand for pacifism by ordering the unilateral self-disarmament of the Hungarian army. The Hungarian Royal Honvéd army still had more than 1,400,000 soldiers, when Károlyi was announced as prime minister. This happened under the direction of Minister of War Béla Linder on 2 November 1918. On the request of the Austro-Hungarian government, an armistice was granted to Austria-Hungary on 3 November 1918 by the Allies. Disarmament of its army meant that Hungary was to remain without a national defence at a time of particular vulnerability. The unilateral self-disarmament made the occupation of Hungary directly possible for the relatively small armies of Romania, the Franco-Serbian army, and the armed forces of the newly established Czechoslovakia. Nevertheless, small Hungarian troops were still able to resist the advancement of the Czech army in the North. Only in early December the Budapest government ordered their withdrawal following a political arrangement with Prague which established the first demarcation line between Hungary and Czechoslovakia.

=== International reactions to the Hungarian disarmament ===
Military and political events changed rapidly and drastically after the Hungarian unilateral disarmament:

- On 5 November 1918, the Serbian army, with the help of the French army, crossed the southern borders.
- On 7 November, Hungarian Prime Minister Mihály Károlyi meets General Louis Franchet d'Espèrey in Belgrade. d'Espèrey bluntly informed Károlyi that the Hungarian government "only represents the Magyar people, and not the other nations of Hungary". When the Hungarian side declared the acceptance of an "Independent Czech and Yugoslav states", the French general responded, "Let us say Czechoslovak".
- On 8 November, the Czechoslovak army crossed the northern borders.
- On 10 November d'Espérey's army crossed the Danube River and was poised to enter the Hungarian heartland.
- On 11 November Germany signed an armistice with Allies, under which they had to immediately withdraw all German troops in Romania and in the Ottoman Empire, the Austro-Hungarian Empire and the Russian Empire back to German territory and Allies to have access to these countries.
- On 13 November, the Romanian army crossed the eastern borders of the Kingdom of Hungary.

Károlyi appointed the liberal progressive and pacifist Oszkár Jászi to become Minister without portfolio for nationality questions. Jászi wanted to indicate that the old Hungarian policy towards non-Hungarian nations and nationalities was over and a new democratic course was to begin. According to Jászi, the main aim of his nationality policy was "to defend the plebiscite principle, and so where possible make conditions more favorable for Hungary." The ultimate goal was the creation of a confederative state system, called Danube Confederation, that would preserve the territorial integrity of the Kingdom of Hungary. Jászi immediately offered democratic referendums about the disputed borders for minorities; however, the political leaders of those minorities refused the very idea of democratic referendums regarding disputed territories at the Paris peace conference. In spite of this, Hungarian government still possessed forces strong enough to resist the encroaching Entente troops, and on 13 November declared the mobilization of the five youngest year groups (1896–1900). This was presaged by Károlyi's proclamation, in which he declared the entrance of Czechoslovak troops a "Czech invasion and occupation".

"The Czechoslovak state was recognized by the Allies, and the Allies recognized the Czechoslovak army as Allied. The Czechoslovak state is entitled to occupy the territory of Slovakia, already because the Czechoslovak state as an Allied participant in the war, is participating in the armistice, in which the former Austro-Hungarian Monarchy was included. As a result of this, I am authorized to call on the Hungarian government to withdraw its army from the territory of Slovakia without delay..." — Supreme Commander of the Allied Armies Marshal Ferdinand Foch, 3 December 1918

The Armistice of 3 November was completed as regards Hungary on 13 November, when Károlyi signed the Armistice of Belgrade with the Allied nations, in order that a Treaty of Peace might be concluded. The terms of the armistice were harsh and without compromise. The Hungarian government had to withdraw its troops behind a line deep into Hungary. The army had to disarm, except for its six infantry and two cavalry divisions. Demarcation lines defining the territory to remain under Hungarian control were made. The lines would apply until definitive borders could be established. The Entente was allowed to occupy strategically important places and its forces were allowed free movement inside Hungary. Under the terms of the armistice, Serbian and French troops advanced from the south, taking control of the Banat and Croatia. Romanian forces were permitted to advance to the River Mureș (Maros). However, on 14 November, Serbia occupied Pécs. General Franchet d'Espèrey followed up the victory by overrunning much of the Balkans, and by the war's end his troops had penetrated well into Hungary. In mid-November 1918, the Czechoslovak troops advanced into the northern parts of the collapsing kingdom (i.e. future Slovakia), but on 14 November Károlyi ordered the Hungarian forces to repulse the "Czech invasion" back. After King Charles IV's withdrawal from government on 16 November 1918, Károlyi proclaimed the First Hungarian Republic, with himself as provisional president of the republic. On the same day the Slovak National Council dispatched Pavel Fábry to Budapest on an official mission to discuss public security and police order in their respective areas. Fábry reported back that the Károlyi government considered the fight against Yugoslavs and Romanians to be lost, and instead aimed to send all of their military forces to the northern front, in order to at least retain "Upper Hungary". Fábry entered talks with Károlyi and Jászi, agreeing to nothing while stalling for time, until the Entente could act. On 6 December, following a note from 3 December sent to Budapest by French Marshal Ferdinand Foch, the Hungarian government agreed to retreat behind temporary boundaries drawn by Milan Hodža, who led a delegation of the Slovak National Council in Budapest. Hodža stipulated that the line he drew "would be valid only until new instructions concerning the demarcation line come from Paris." On 24 December 1918, the French Minister of Foreign Affairs Stephen Pichon informed Budapest of a new demarcation line, and the Hungarian government agreed to extend the Czechoslovak zone of occupation to Pozsony (Bratislava), Komárom (Komárno), Kassa (Košice) and Ungvár (Užhorod). By late January 1919, the Czechoslovak troops advanced into these areas. The Budapest approval for the Czechoslovak advancement was largely explained by the Hungarian desire to reopen trade with Czech lands and to obtain crucially needed coal amidst an energy crisis. As a result, by 4 February 1919, the Czechoslovak Ministry moved its headquarters from Zsolna (Žilina) to newly renamed Bratislava (formerly Pozsony). During the rule of Károlyi's pacifist cabinet, Hungary rapidly lost control over approximately 75% of its former pre-WWI territories (325,411 km^{2} (125,642 sq mi)) without a fight and was subject to foreign occupation.

=== Fall of the liberal First Hungarian Republic and communist coup d'état ===
The Károlyi government failed to manage both domestic and military issues and lost popular support. On 20 March 1919, Béla Kun, who had been imprisoned in the Markó Street prison, was released. On 21 March, he led a successful communist coup d'état; Károlyi was deposed and arrested. Kun formed a social democratic, communist coalition government and proclaimed the Hungarian Soviet Republic. Days later the communists purged the social democrats from the government. The Hungarian Soviet Republic was a small communist rump state. When the Republic of Councils in Hungary was established, it controlled only approximately 23% of Hungary's historic territory. After the Communist takeover, the Allies sent a new diplomatic mission to Budapest, led by General Jan Smuts. During these talks with Smuts, Kun insisted that his government would abide by the Belgrade ceasefire and recognise the right to self-determination of the various ethnic groups living in Hungary. In return, Kun urged an end to the Allied trade blockade, particularly by the Czechs, and to allow fuel and food to be imported into Hungary.

The communists remained bitterly unpopular in the Hungarian countryside, where the authority of that government was often nonexistent. Rather than divide the big estates among the peasants – which might have gained their support for the government, but would have created a class of small-holding farmers the communist government proclaimed the nationalization of the estates. But having no skilled people to manage the estates, the communists had no choice but to leave the existing estate managers in place. These, while formally accepting their new government bosses, in practice retained their loyalty to the deposed aristocratic owners. The peasants felt that the revolution had no real effect on their lives and thus had no reason to support it. The communist party and communist policies only had real popular support among the proletarian masses of large industrial centers—especially in Budapest—where the working class represented a high proportion of the inhabitants. The communist government followed the Soviet model: the party established its terror groups (like the infamous Lenin Boys) to "overcome the obstacles" in the Hungarian countryside. This was later known as the Red Terror in Hungary.

In late May, after the Entente military representative demanded more territorial concessions from Hungary, Kun attempted to "fulfill" his promise to adhere to Hungary's historical borders. The men of the Hungarian Red Army were recruited mainly from the volunteers of the Budapest proletariat. On 20 May 1919, a force under Colonel Aurél Stromfeld attacked and routed Czechoslovak troops from Miskolc. The Romanian Army attacked the Hungarian flank with troops from the 16th Infantry Division and the Second Vânători Division, aiming to maintain contact with the Czechoslovak Army. Hungarian troops prevailed, and the Romanian Army retreated to its bridgehead at Tokaj. There, between 25 and 30 May, Romanian forces were required to defend their position against Hungarian attacks. On 3 June, Romania was forced into further retreat but extended its line of defence along the Tisza River and reinforced its position with the 8th Division, which had been moving forward from Bukovina since 22 May. Hungary then controlled the territory almost to its old borders; regained control of industrial areas around Miskolc, Salgótarján, Selmecbánya (Banská Štiavnica), Kassa (Košice).

In June, the Hungarian Red Army invaded the eastern part of the so-called Upper Hungary, now claimed by the newly forming Czechoslovak state. The Hungarian Red Army achieved some military success early on: under the leadership of Colonel Aurél Stromfeld, it ousted Czechoslovak troops from the north and planned to march against the Romanian Army in the east. Kun ordered the preparation of an offensive against Czechoslovakia, which would increase his domestic support by making good on his promise to restore Hungary's borders. The Hungarian Red Army recruited men between 19 and 25 years of age. Industrial workers from Budapest volunteered. Many former Austro-Hungarian officers re-enlisted for patriotic reasons. The Hungarian Red Army moved its 1st and 5th artillery divisions—40 battalions—to Upper Hungary.

Despite promises for the restoration of the former borders of Hungary, the communists declared the establishment of the Slovak Soviet Republic in Prešov (Eperjes) on 16 June 1919. After the proclamation of the Slovak Soviet Republic, the Hungarian nationalists and patriots soon realized that the new communist government had no intentions to recapture the lost territories, only to spread communist ideology and establish other communist states in Europe, thus sacrificing Hungarian national interests. The Hungarian patriots and professional military officers in the Red Army saw the establishment of the Slovak Soviet Republic as a betrayal, and their support for the government began to erode. Despite a series of military victories against the Czechoslovak army, the Hungarian Red Army started to disintegrate due to tension between nationalists and communists during the establishment of the Slovak Soviet Republic. The concession eroded support of the communist government among professional military officers and nationalists in the Hungarian Red Army; even the chief of the general staff Aurél Stromfeld, resigned his post in protest.

When the French promised the Hungarian government that Romanian forces would withdraw from the Tiszántúl, Kun withdrew from Czechoslovakia his remaining military units who had remained loyal after the political fiasco with the Slovak Soviet Republic. Kun then unsuccessfully tried to turn the remaining units of the demoralized Hungarian Red Army on the Romanians.

=== Treaty preparation and Conference at Trianon in Paris ===
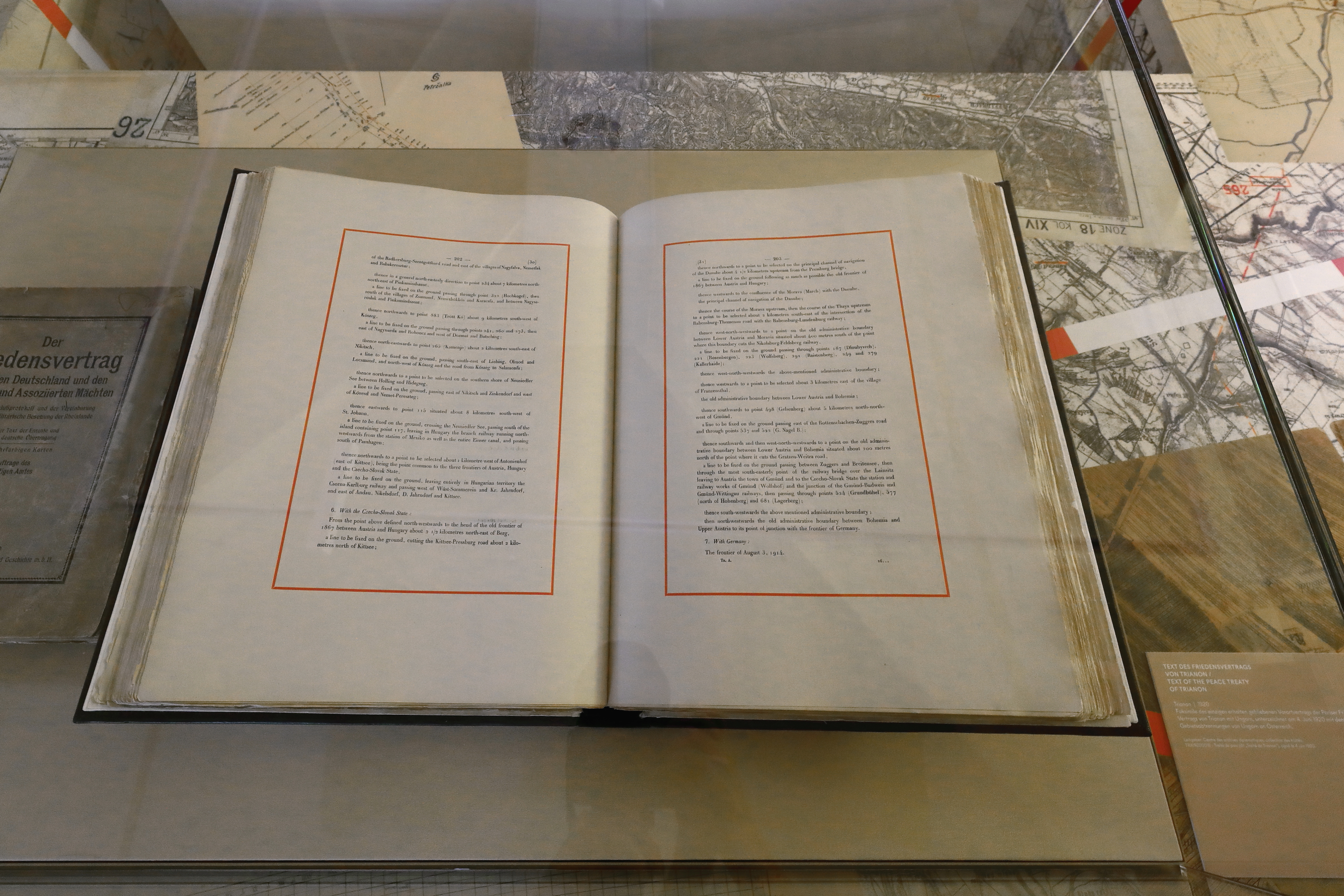
Treaty of Trianon

After the fall of the communist regime of Béla Kun, the instability of the Hungarian state delayed the sending of a Hungarian delegation to the Peace conference in Paris. On 16 November 1919, Admiral Miklós Horthy entered Budapest, taking over the running of the country for a long time and thus bringing to an end the period of unstable Hungarian governments. By December 1919, text of the proposed Peace Treaty with Hungary was fully prepared in Paris. Thereafter, the Károly Huszár government, which received the international recognition of the Entente, was invited to participate in the Paris Peace Conference on 2 December. The notable pre-WW1 politician and diplomat Count Albert Apponyi was appointed to lead the Hungarian delegation to the Paris Peace Conference to represent the Hungarian interests. Simultaneously, Horthy entrusted Count Pál Teleki with collecting and preparing all the material necessary for the peace conference. Nevertheless it was Apponyi who took over the conceptual leadership of all the works connected with the peace talk. The Czechoslovak President Tomáš Masaryk, knowing that the Hungarian delegation to Paris would be eventually headed by Apponyi, proposed to compile statistics on Hungarian education, where it would be emphasized that it was precisely Apponyi, who in his role as Minister for Education, suppressed the education of minorities in their native languages. The Czechoslovak delegation would be headed by the Slovak ambassador Štefan Osuský, who was given the task to monitor and study Hungarian counter-proposals.

The result of the common work of Apponyi and Teleki was the so-called Memoirs: a huge amount of written material containing 346 memoirs supplemented with 4000 pages of large office format with 100 maps and many other statistical and graphical supplements. Copies of the basic set of Memoirs were sent to Paris in January 1920, and further supplements, protest notes and demands were added in the following months. The Memoir intended to present a harmonious life of the nations and nationalities inside the Kingdom of Hungary while denying their oppression, marginalization and systematic assimilation. But its massive size also turned to be its greatest weakness, as it made it easy for the Paris peace commission to point out any contradiction. Apponyi's claims on the question of education were likewise pointed out to be contradictory to what he claimed and what he passed while in office as Minister of Education (1906–1910), which the Czechoslovak side exploited with great effect. The lack of unity and contradictions of the Hungarian Memoirs was because they failed to consistently pursue a single fact. Instead, they argued in favor of four different positions:

- The complete integrity and indivisibility of the historic Kingdom of Hungary, without a plebiscite
- A plebiscite on the territories separated from Hungary
- Adjustments of the borders in favor of Hungary without a plebiscite
- Cultural, economical, transportation and ecclesiastical concessions in the separated territories

The Hungarian representatives placed the blame for the Great War on the former Austrian government. The war was directed centrally from Vienna and Hungarians took no responsibility for its origin or continuation. Hungarians committed no sin other than fighting bravely in the war that was forced on them. Hungarian representatives also claimed credit for ending the war, when they laid down arms after Wilson promulgated his Fourteen Points, only to be rewarded with occupation and robbery of its territory by the Entente. The Bolshevik revolution in Hungary was also blamed on the Entente. The French representatives countered that the Hungarian parliament was in a political alliance with the Prussians since 1867 and continuously supported German imperialism. Apponyi was reminded of how he himself notoriously welcomed the proclamation of the war against Serbia by shouting "Hát végre!" ("At last!") at the Hungarian Parliament in 1914, and how he proceeded to make territorial demands against Serbia. The Hungarian delegation claimed that a diminished Hungary would not be capable of independent economic life and would only be a burden to the Entente. What's worse, all the lost natural wealth and energy would be in the hands of "less cultured nations", unable to use it. The alleged cultural inferiority of Romanians, Slovaks and Yugoslavs would not only lead to economic decline, but would also have a destructive effect on spiritual and moral life, on science, arts, literature, religion (especially European Catholicism), social development and political organization. This is why these nations did not deserve self-realization and should remain under the leadership of Hungarians "who represented a highly developed and state-forming element in the Carpathian basin". This racially colored mentality of a "ruling nation" was used thorough the Memoirs submitted by the Hungarian representatives, and was also used to justify Magyarization. All the non-Hungarian nations and nationalities (with the exception of the Germans and Saxons) had "a much less developed civilization than the Hungarians", which the Hungarian state blamed on their inferior languages. The Slovaks, Romanians and Jews "willingly" magyarized themselves, because they realized that "the Magyar race was the bearer of a thousand years of civilization".

Before World War I, only three European countries declared ethnic minority rights, and enacted minority-protecting laws: the first was Hungary (1849 and 1868), the second was Austria (1867), and the third was Belgium (1898). In contrast, the legal systems of other pre-WW1 era European countries did not allow the use of European minority languages in primary schools, in cultural institutions, in offices of public administration and at the legal courts.

"In the name of the great principle so happily phrased by President Wilson, namely that no group of people, no population, may be transferred from one State to the other without being first consulted – as though they were a herd of cattle with no will of their own – in the name of this great principle, an axiom of good sense and public morals, we request and demand a plebiscite in those parts of Hungary which are now on the point of being severed from us. I declare that we are willing to bow to the decision of a plebiscite, whatever it should be".
[...]
"Gentlemen! From the point of view of the great interests of humanity I think the fact of national hegemony falling into the hands of races who, while offering the best hopes for the future, are yet today on a low level of civilisation, can be looked upon neither with indifference nor with satisfaction." — Details from the closing speech of Count Albert Apponyi, head of the Hungarian delegation on 16 January 1920

The arguments used by Hungary concentrated on proving the historical, geographical, economic and spiritual unity of the old Kingdom of Hungary. Yet, the Memoirs mixed them all in a confusing way. Hungary also demanded plebiscites as a means to restore the former multi-national Kingdom of Hungary, and not to create a majority Hungarian nation state. The Supreme Council of the Peace Conference, when drawing the Czechoslovak–Hungarian border, applied the principle of mutual balance of minorities in the two states, since, as they claimed, creating a clean and precise ethnic border was impossible. The Supreme Council rejected the maximum demands of the Czechoslovak side, nor did it apply a purely geographical or ethnic principle, but combined them with economical, historical, transportation, military strategical, and other geopolitical factors. The Supreme Council accepted Czechoslovak arguments that showed that post-war Hungary was self-sufficient in coal, crude oil, grain, cattle and other areas of agriculture, railways and transport.

"The Hungarian reply [at the Trianon conference] showed us our neighbors in a true light... Hungarian cunning and hypocrisy, their slithering smarminess towards the stronger, their brutal imperiousness towards the weak, and inflated scorn for those they consider inferior. The greatest source of their shortcomings and errors is blind and uncritical self-love. These vices, in which they excelled during the war, are still the leading principles of their politics and their whole life. We have a vital interest in carefully following all their movements, but especially in avoiding similar errors." — Ing. Štefan Janšák, Slovak archeologist, historian and publicist, speaking after the conclusion of the 1920 Paris Peace conference at Trianon

The Hungarian delegation, led by Count Apponyi, arrived in Paris on 7 January 1920 and was informed that the peace conditions would be submitted to him on 15 January. On 14 January, Apponyi publicly protested in the press against the conditions for peace, despite still not knowing their official text. His demand to talk directly with the leading representatives of the Entente before officially receiving the text further irritated the Supreme Council and was declined. It would have meant preferential treatment for the Hungarians, as no other delegation from a defeated state had been given the same advantage. On 15 January, Apponyi received the text of the proposed Peace Treaty in the "Red Hall", and the next day Apponyi made his prepared speech to the Supreme Council. He called for the right of self-determination of Hungarians, denied that other nations were oppressed in the old Kingdom of Hungary, claimed that Hungary had a historic mission, emphasized the geographical and economic unity of the country, condemned that many Hungarians were now living under the "hegemony of races with lower cultures" and declared that the torso of the historic Hungarian kingdom could not live without the lost regions, without its mineral wealth, water energy and labor force. Hungary would never accept these borders and would follow a policy aimed at its revision. The lengthy negotiation process was recorded on a daily basis by János Wettstein, deputy first secretary of the Hungarian delegation. According to Hronský, it turned out to be a mistake on Hungary's part when it appointed Apponyi to lead the Hungarian delegation. Count Apponyi, though popular in Hungary, had a negative reputation in the neighboring countries. His education acts (1907), his pro-German policy during the war and negative relations with the non-Hungarian nationalities of Hungary made him an easy target for the international press. Štefan Osuský, the Czechoslovak ambassador in Paris, did not bother to hide his glee at Hungary choosing Apponyi of all people. "The choice of Apponyi was very welcome to me", wrote Osuský back to Prague, "In the former Kingdom of Hungary, he embodied the spirit of disregard and oppression of the Slovaks, and as such I would grant to him that he should be the one to sign the sentence of condemnation not only of his life". The Czechoslovak, Romanian and Yugoslavian delegation decided on a joint approach when replying to the Hungarian memorandums. On 26 February, the Hungarian newspaper Pesti Hírlap ridiculed this cooperation as some kind of "Little Entente".

The treaty of peace in its final form was submitted to the Hungarians on 6 May and signed by them in Grand Trianon on 4 June 1920, entering into force on 26 July 1921. An extensive accompanying letter, written by the Chairman of the Peace Conference Alexandre Millerand, was sent along with the Peace Treaty to Hungary. The letter emphasized that the Great Powers studied the notes provided by the Hungarian delegation, but "could not ignore the partial responsibility which falls on Hungary for the outbreak of the World War and in general for the imperialist policy pursued by the Dual Monarchy." It also mentioned that the "territorial clauses in the peace conditions would not be changed at all, because any change of the frontiers which the Hungarian delegation demanded would have very unfortunate results." Examination of Hungarian counter-proposals only confirmed to them that the borders should remain as they were drafted in 1919, because "the nationality situation in Central Europe is such that it is not possible to ensure that political borders fully agree with ethnic borders," and thus the Great Powers were forced to leave some populations under the sovereignty of other states. In spite of this, the Great Powers rejected the Hungarian claim "that it would be better to not change the historic borders: The continuation of a situation, even if it is a thousand years old, is not justified if it is against justice." The belated Hungarian offers for Slovak autonomy within Hungary were dismissed as a diplomatic trick, since "the basic historic fact was that for many years all the efforts of the Hungarian political elite were directed towards silencing the voices of the national minorities." At the end, Millerand's letter categorically emphasized, that "The conditions for peace, which were presented to you today, are, however, definitive."

The United States did not ratify the Treaty of Trianon. Instead it negotiated a separate peace treaty that did not contradict the terms of the Trianon treaty.

"Today it is possible to say that Hungarian or Magyar imperialism will be broken. Although we risk angering Hungarian patriots, whose propaganda reaches as far as Switzerland, we do not hesitate to declare that this strictness appears to us to be justified, since the former frontiers of Hungary gave the Hungarian or Magyar minority of 9 million headed by the nobility the position ... to exploit 12 million people of other nationalities. The French Government did not always speak to the Hungarians in the language they deserved, and the English aristocracy agreed with the Hungarian oligarchy even in the course of the war. However, it appears that the Hungarian nobility went too far: by evoking Bolshevism and installing a white terror, they destroyed the good will of their sympathizers in London and Paris. We hope that the Hungarians or Magyars will be satisfied with a national, non-imperial state, and that they will give up their almost Asiatic institutions and accept new principles." – Swiss newspaper Gazette de Lausanne, reacting to the signing of the Treat of Trianon

=== Coal shortage in Hungary and the peace-making ===
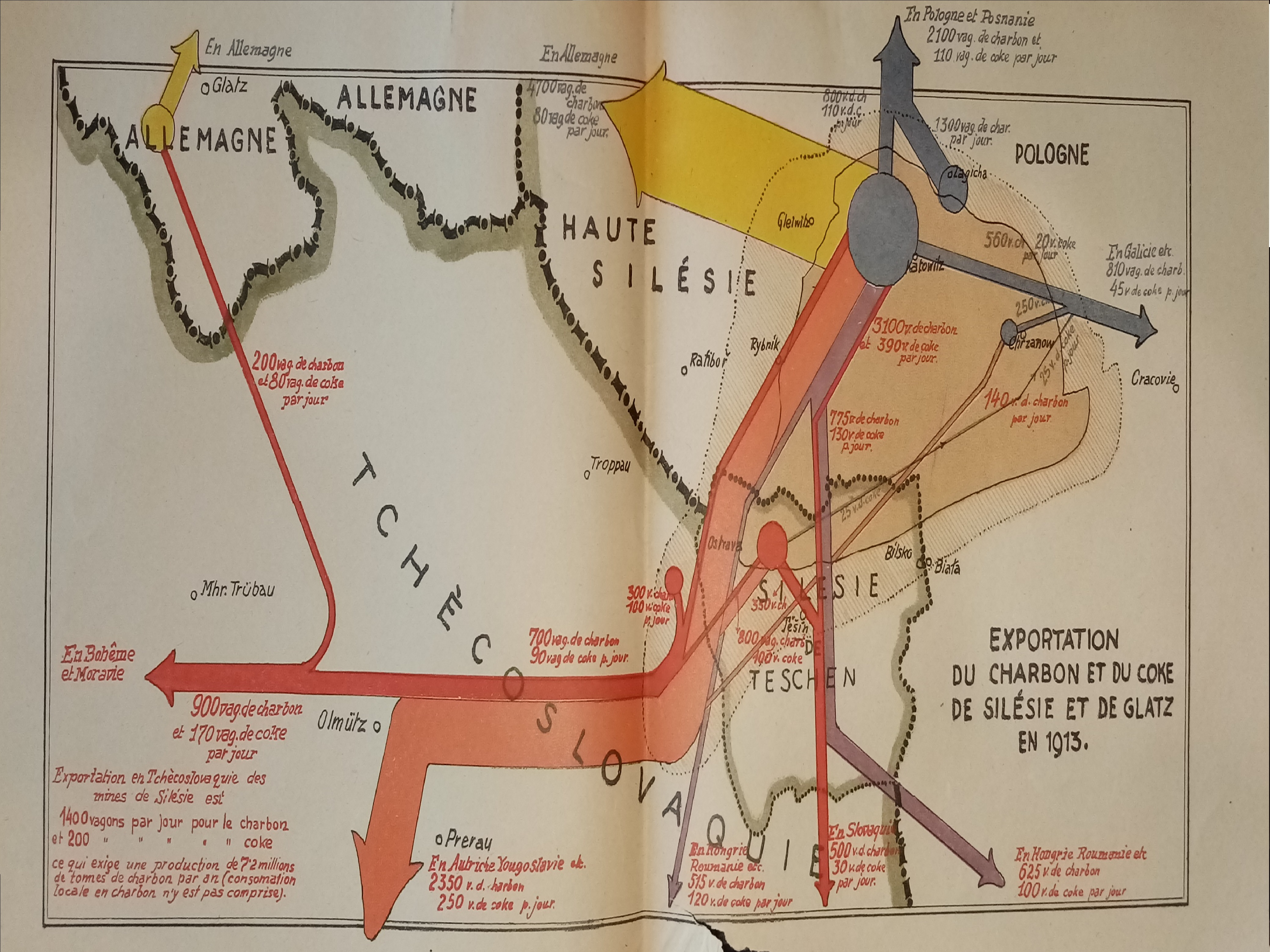
Coal exports from Silesia to neighboring regions in 1913. The map was produced by the Czechoslovak map-makers in early 1919.

The Treaty of Trianon not only redrew Hungary's borders but also laid down rules for the restoration of economic relations between Hungary and foreign countries, including its neighbors – the Entente allies: Czechoslovakia, Romania and Yugoslavia. The peace treaty de facto ended the Allied blockade of Hungary and de jure ordered the resumption of regional trade and the supply of coal to Hungary from Czechoslovakia and Poland. Together with other international agreements signed at the Paris Peace Conference, such as the Saint-Germain Peace Treaty of 1919 and the Teschen Settlement of July 1920, it provided the legal framework for overcoming the economic chaos in Central Europe caused by the First World War and exacerbated by the disintegration of the Austro-Hungarian common market in late 1918.

The critical element of the economic paralysis in Hungary and other Danubian countries was the shortage of coal, which had been aggravating since 1914, but became critical in 1918–1920. While coal production in the Habsburg Monarchy had been declining after 1914, the disappearance of imperial unity at the end of 1918 halted the distribution of coal from the Silesian mines to various consuming regions, including Hungary. Coal production in Hungary fell from 10 million tonnes in 1913 to 3 million tonnes in 1919, but the most drastic blow came from the cessation of imports of 5 million tonnes of rich Silesian bituminous coal. The stoppage of coal imports was mainly due to the blockade imposed by the Czechoslovak government over Hungary at the end of 1918. In fact, Czechs gained control over a significant part of the Silesian mines, such as in Teschen, and over the transit railways from Silesia to Vienna and Budapest. From November–December 1918, Prague made the resumption of coal supplies to Vienna and Budapest conditional on the acceptance of its territorial claims to former Austrian and Hungarian territories.

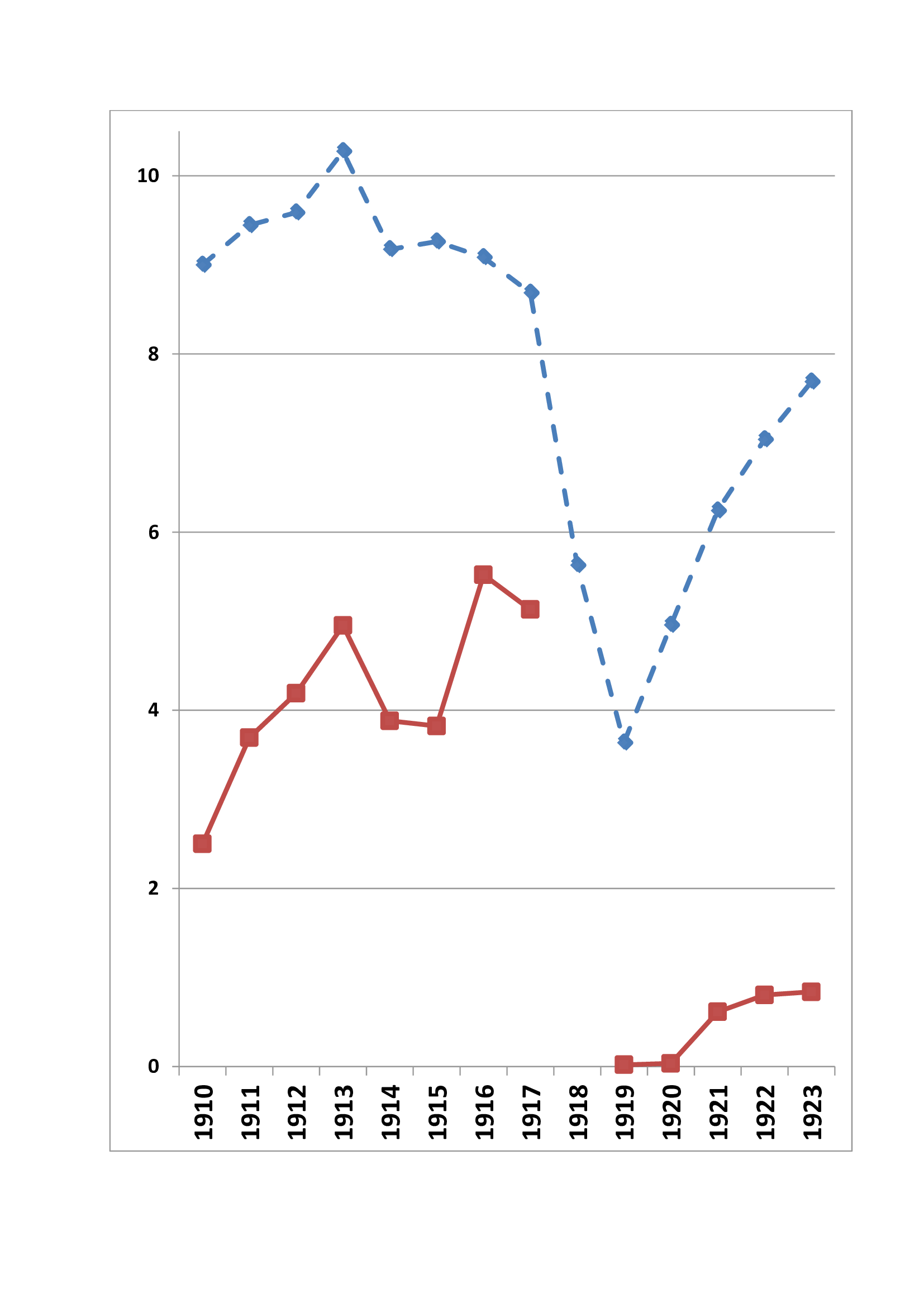
Coal Production (up; blue rhombus) and Coal Import (down; red square) in Hungary in million tons

As the Hungarian revolutionary leader Vilmos Böhm recalled about the Hungarian-Czech coal talks, "every wagon of coal should be paid for with territorial concessions". Despite the withdrawal of Hungarian troops from the Upper Hungarian territories claimed by Prague (Slovakia in December 1918 – January 1919 and Subcarpathian Ruthenia in April–July 1919), Czechoslovakia maintained a blockade on coal exports to Hungary until the signing of the Trianon Peace Treaty in June 1920.

The acute coal shortage had a profound effect on Hungary's economy and infrastructure. Industrial production and transport were severely hampered. The shortage led to desperate diplomatic efforts by the government in Budapest to secure coal supplies and stabilise the economy. In November 1918, the Hungarian government began negotiations with Czechoslovakia and the Entente powers to alleviate the coal crisis. Hungary's desperate need for coal influenced its diplomatic strategy and led it to make concessions. Hungary also sought help from the Entente, recognising that cooperation with its neighbours and the victorious powers was essential for economic recovery.

Czechoslovakia and the Entente powers strategically used coal supplies as leverage to force Hungary to make territorial and political concessions. The negotiated peace treaty project included passages, which stipulated the obligation of Czechoslovakia and Poland to provide coal to Hungary in necessary quantities, but also assured that the two important coal-mining centers of Hungary – surrounding towns of Pécs and of Salgótarján – would be freed from the occupying Czech and Serbian troops and remain inside Hungary. The great powers understood that Hungary's desperate need for coal and trade with neighbouring countries, particularly Czechoslovakia, would force Budapest to accept the heavy territorial losses in favour of Prague. After the ratification of the Trianon Treaty by the Hungarian Parliament in November 1920, Hungary started receiving increasing quantities of coal via Czechoslovakia. During the 1920s, Czechoslovakia became the most important trading partner of Hungary.

== Borders of Hungary ==
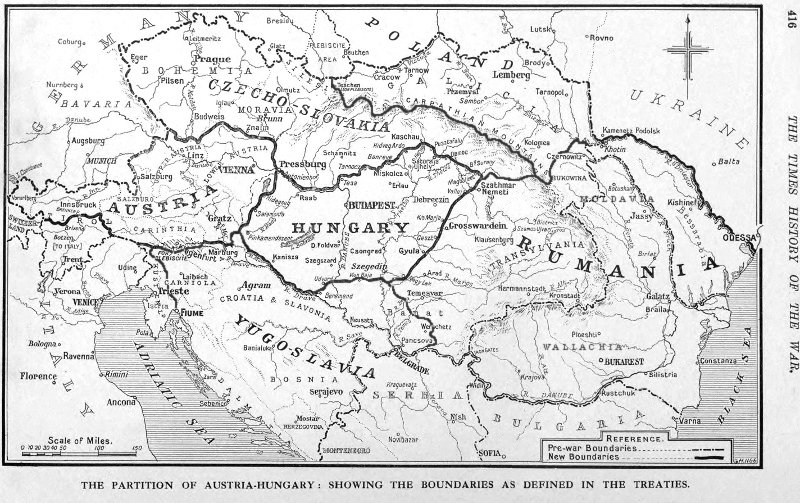
Drafted borders of Austria-Hungary in the treaties of Trianon and Saint Germain

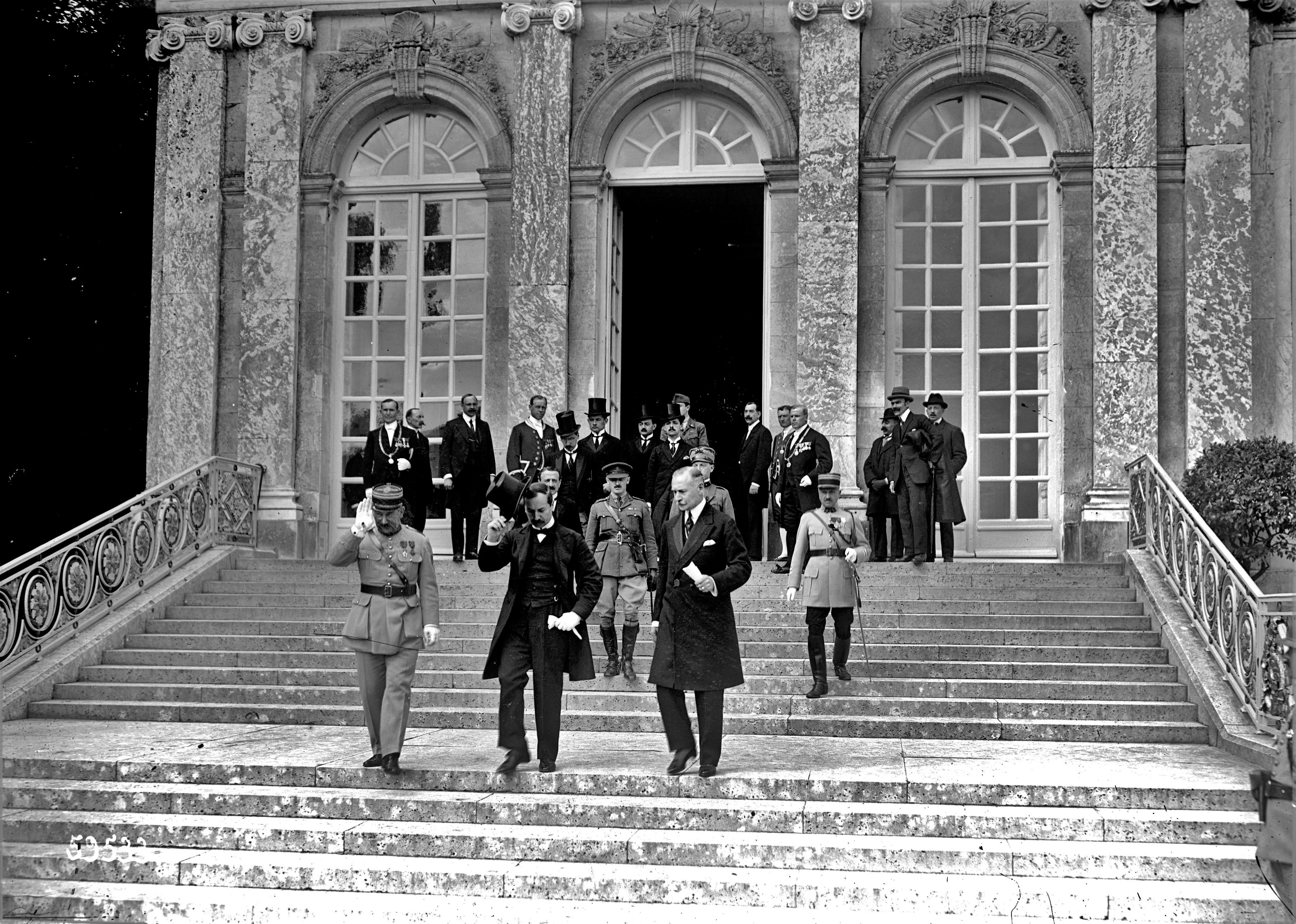
The Hungarian delegation leaving Grand Trianon Palace at Versailles, after the treaty was signed, 1920.

The Hungarian government terminated its union with Austria on 31 October 1918, officially dissolving the Austro-Hungarian dual monarchy. The de facto temporary borders of independent Hungary were defined by the ceasefire lines in November–December 1918. Compared with the pre-war Kingdom of Hungary, these temporary borders did not include:

- Part of Transylvania south of the Mureș River and east of the Someș River, which came under the control of Romania (cease-fire agreement of Belgrade signed on 13 November 1918).
- The General Council of the Saxons in Nagyszeben (now Sibiu in Romania) decided in question of Transylvania to choose clear neutrality, without committing themselves either to the Hungarian or the Romanian side on 25 November 1918.
- The Romanian Army occupied Marosvásárhely (now Târgu Mureș in Romania), the most important town of Székely Land in Transylvania. On the same day the National Assembly of Székelys in Marosvásárhely reaffirms their support to the territorial integrity of Hungary on 25 November 1918.
- On 1 December 1918, the Great National Assembly of Alba Iulia declared union with the Kingdom of Romania.
- In response, a Hungarian General Assembly in Kolozsvár (now Cluj in Romania), the most important Hungarian town in Transylvania, reaffirms the loyalty of Hungarians from Transylvania to Hungary on 22 December 1918.
- Slovakia was proclaimed as part of Czechoslovakia (status quo set by the Czechoslovak legions and accepted by the Entente on 25 November 1918). Afterwards, the Slovak politician Milan Hodža discussed with the Hungarian Minister of Defence, Albert Bartha, a temporary demarcation line that left between 650,000 and 886,000 Hungarians in the newly formed Czechoslovakia and between 142,000 and 399,000 Slovaks in the remainder of Hungary (the discrepancy was caused by the different way census was collected in Hungary and Czechoslovakia). That was signed on 6 December 1918.
- South Slavic lands, which, after the war, were organised into two political formations – the State of Slovenes, Croats and Serbs and Banat, Bačka and Baranja, which both came under control of South Slavs, according to the ceasefire agreement of Belgrade signed on 13 November 1918. Previously, on 29 October 1918, the Kingdom of Croatia-Slavonia parliament, an autonomous kingdom within Transleithania, terminated the union with the Kingdom of Hungary and on 30 October 1918 the Hungarian diet adopted a motion declaring that the constitutional relations between the two states had ended. Croatia-Slavonia was included in a newly formed State of Slovenes, Croats, and Serbs (which also included some other South Slavic territories, formerly administered by Austria-Hungary) on 29 October 1918. This state and the Kingdom of Serbia formed the Kingdom of Serbs, Croats and Slovenes (Yugoslavia) on 1 December 1918.

The territories of Banat, Bačka and Baranja (which included most of the pre-war Hungarian counties of Baranya, Bács-Bodrog, Torontál, and Temes) came under military control by the Kingdom of Serbia and political control by local South Slavs. The Great People's Assembly of Serbs, Bunjevci and other Slavs in Banat, Bačka and Baranja declared union of this region with Serbia on 25 November 1918. The ceasefire line had the character of a temporary international border until the treaty. The central parts of Banat were later assigned to Romania, respecting the wishes of Romanians from this area, which, on 1 December 1918, were present in the National Assembly of Romanians in Alba Iulia, which voted for union with the Kingdom of Romania.

- The city of Rijeka was occupied by the Italian nationalists group. Its affiliation was a matter of international dispute between the Kingdom of Italy and Yugoslavia.
- Croatian-populated territories in modern Međimurje remained under Hungarian control after the Armistice of Belgrade of 13 November 1918. After the Međimurje was occupied by forces led by Slavko Kvaternik on 24 December 1918, this region declared separation from Hungary and entry into Yugoslavia at the popular assembly of 9 January 1919.

After the Romanian Army advanced beyond this cease-fire line, the Entente powers asked Hungary (Vix Note) to acknowledge the new Romanian territorial gains by a new line set along the Tisza river. Unable to reject these terms and unwilling to accept them, the leaders of the Hungarian Democratic Republic resigned and the Communists seized power. In spite of the country being under Allied blockade, the Hungarian Soviet Republic was formed and the Hungarian Red Army was rapidly set up. This army was initially successful against the Czechoslovak Legions, due to covert food and arms aid from Italy. This made it possible for Hungary to reach nearly the former Galician (Polish) border, thus separating the Czechoslovak and Romanian troops from each other.

After a Hungarian-Czechoslovak cease-fire signed on 1 July 1919, the Hungarian Red Army left parts of Slovakia by 4 July, as the Entente powers promised to invite a Hungarian delegation to the Versailles Peace Conference. In the end, this particular invitation was not issued. Béla Kun, leader of the Hungarian Soviet Republic, then turned the Hungarian Red Army on the Romanian Army and attacked at the Tisza river on 20 July 1919. After fierce fighting that lasted some five days, the Hungarian Red Army collapsed. The Royal Romanian Army marched into Budapest on 4 August 1919.

The Hungarian state was restored by the Entente powers, helping Admiral Horthy into power in November 1919. On 1 December 1919, the Hungarian delegation was officially invited to the Versailles Peace Conference; however, the newly defined borders of Hungary were nearly concluded without the presence of the Hungarians. During prior negotiations, the Hungarian party, along with the Austrian, advocated the American principle of self-determination: that the population of disputed territories should decide by free plebiscite to which country they wished to belong. This view did not prevail for long, as it was disregarded by the decisive French and British delegates. According to some opinions, the Allies drafted the outline of the new frontiers with little or no regard to the historical, cultural, ethnic, geographic, economic and strategic aspects of the region. The Allies assigned territories that were mostly populated by non-Hungarian ethnicities to successor states, but also allowed these states to absorb sizeable territories that were mainly inhabited by Hungarian-speaking populations. For instance, Romania gained all of Transylvania, which was home to 2,800,000 Romanians, but also contained a significant minority of 1,600,000 Hungarians and about 250,000 Germans. The intent of the Allies was principally to strengthen these successor states at the expense of Hungary. Although the countries that were the main beneficiaries of the treaty partially noted the issues, the Hungarian delegates tried to draw attention to them. Their views were disregarded by the Allied representatives.

Some predominantly Hungarian settlements, consisting of more than two million people, were situated in a typically 20–50 km (12–31 mi) wide strip along the new borders in foreign territory. More concentrated groups were found in Czechoslovakia (parts of southern Slovakia), Yugoslavia (parts of northern Délvidék), and Romania (parts of Transylvania).

The final borders of Hungary were defined by the Treaty of Trianon signed on 4 June 1920. Besides exclusion of the previously mentioned territories, they also did not include:

- the rest of Transylvania, which together with some additional parts of the pre-war Kingdom of Hungary became part of Romania;
- Carpathian Ruthenia, which became part of Czechoslovakia, pursuant to the Treaty of Saint-Germain in 1919;
- most of Burgenland, which became part of Austria, also pursuant to the Treaty of Saint-Germain (the district of Sopron opted to remain within Hungary after a plebiscite held in December 1921, the only place where the result of a plebiscite was a factor in a border decision);
- Međimurje and two-thirds of the Slovene March or Vendvidék (now Prekmurje), which became part of the Kingdom of Serbs, Croats and Slovenes.

By the Treaty of Trianon, the cities of Pécs, Mohács, Baja and Szigetvár, which were under Serb-Croat-Slovene administration after November 1918, were assigned to Hungary. An arbitration committee in 1920 assigned small northern parts of the former Árva and Szepes counties of the Kingdom of Hungary that had Polish majority population to Poland. After 1918, Hungary did not have access to the sea; it formerly had a direct route through the Rijeka coastline and an indirect one through Croatia-Slavonia.

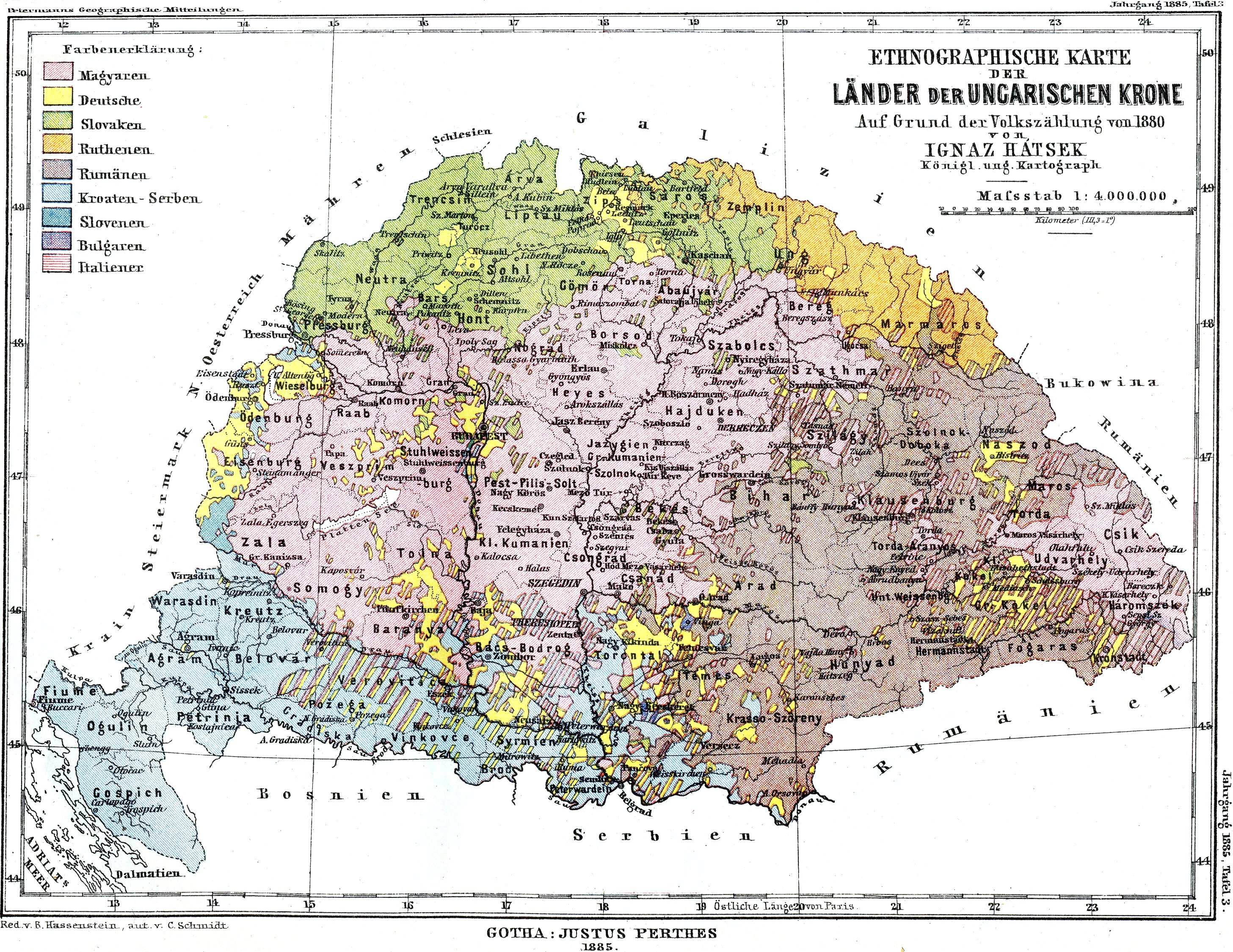
1885 ethnographic map of the Lands of the Crown of Saint Stephen, i.e. Kingdom of Hungary and Croatia-Slavonia according to the 1880 census

Representatives of small nations living in the former Austria-Hungary and active in the Congress of Oppressed Nations regarded the treaty of Trianon as a righting of historical wrongs, and wanted their nations "to be founded and durably assured on the firm basis of world democracy, real and sovereign government by the people, and a universal alliance of the nations vested with the authority of arbitration"; at the same time they called for an end to "the existing unbearable domination of one nation over the other" and "for nations to organize their relations to each other on the basis of equal rights and free conventions". Furthermore, they believed the treaty would help toward a new era of dependence on international law, the fraternity of nations, equal rights, and human liberty as well as aid civilisation in the effort to free humanity from international violence.

== Results and consequences ==
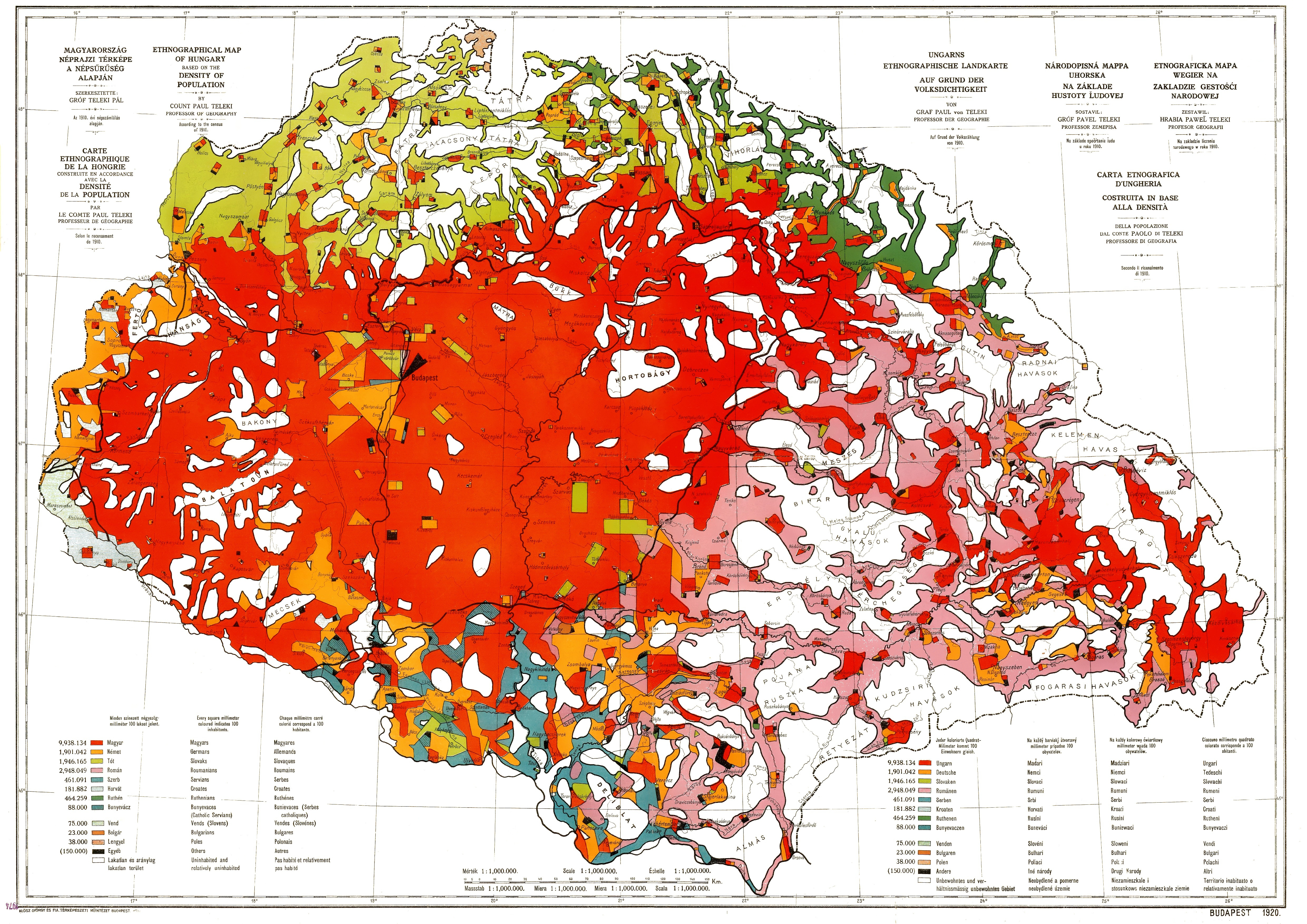
The Red Map, an ethnographic map of "Hungary proper" publicised by the Hungarian delegation. Regions with population density below 20 persons/km^{2} (51.8 persons/sq. mi.) are left blank and the corresponding population is represented in the nearest region with population density above that limit. Hungarian German Slovak Ruthenians Romanian Serbian Regions with fewer than 20 persons/sq km

Irredentism—the demand for reunification of Hungarian peoples—became a central theme of Hungarian politics and diplomacy.

=== 1910 census ===
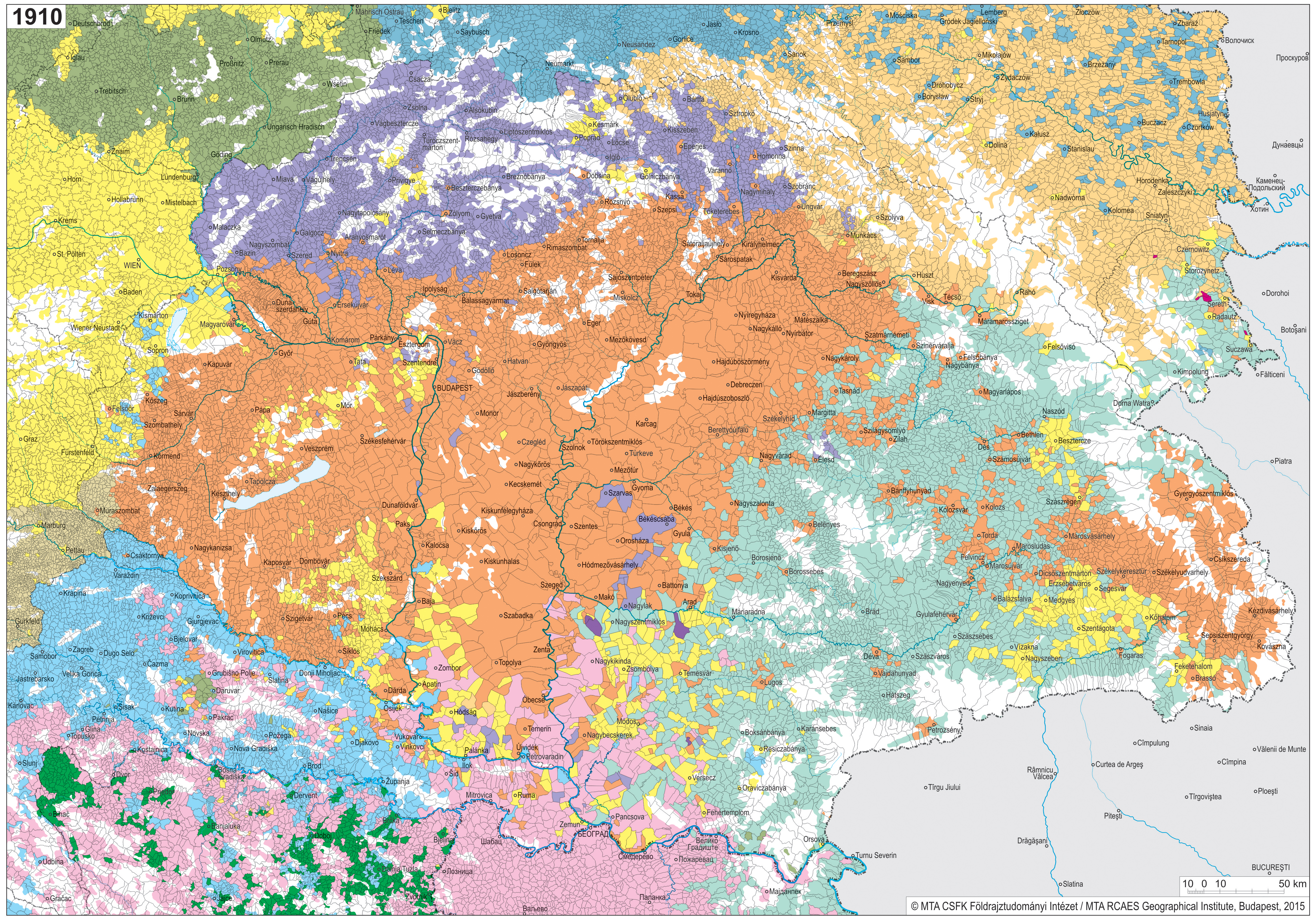
Ethnographic map of the Kingdom of Hungary according to the 1910 census

The last census before the Treaty of Trianon was held in 1910. This census recorded population by language and religion but not by ethnicity. On the other hand, in pre-WW1 era Europe, there were only language censuses in a few countries, but the first ethnic censuses were not implemented in Europe until the interwar period. However, it is generally accepted that the largest ethnic group in the Kingdom of Hungary in this time were the Hungarians. According to the census, speakers of the Hungarian language included approximately 48% of the population of the kingdom (including the autonomous Croatia-Slavonia) and 54% of the population of the territory referred to as "Hungary proper", i.e. excluding Croatia. Within the borders of "Hungary proper" numerous ethnic minorities were present: 16.1% Romanians, 10.5% Slovaks, 10.4% Germans, 2.5% Ruthenians, 2.5% Serbs and 8% others. 5% of the population of "Hungary proper" were Jews, who were included in speakers of the Hungarian language. The population of the autonomous Croatia-Slavonia was mostly composed of Croats and Serbs (who together counted 87% of population).

==== Criticism of the 1910 census ====
The census of 1910 classified the residents of the Kingdom of Hungary by their native languages and religions, so it presents the preferred language of the individual, which may or may not correspond to the individual's ethnic identity. To make the situation even more complex, in the multilingual kingdom there were territories with ethnically mixed populations where people spoke two or even three languages natively. For example, in the territory what is today Slovakia (then part of Upper Hungary) 18% of the Slovaks, 33% of the Hungarians and 65% of the Germans were bilingual. In addition, 21% of the Germans spoke both Slovak and Hungarian beside German. These reasons are ground for debate about the accuracy of the census.

While several demographers (David W. Paul, Peter Hanak, László Katus) state that the outcome of the census is reasonably accurate, others believe that the 1910 census was manipulated by exaggerating the percentage of the speakers of Hungarian, pointing to the discrepancy between an improbably high growth of the Hungarian-speaking population and the decrease of percentual participation of speakers of other languages through Magyarization in the late 19th century. For example, the 1921 census in Czechoslovakia (only one year after the Treaty of Trianon) shows 21% Hungarians in Slovakia, compared to 30% based on 1910 census.

Some Slovak demographers (such as Ján Svetoň and Julius Mesaros) dispute the result of every pre-war census. Owen Johnson, an American historian, accepts the numbers of the earlier censuses up to the one in 1900, according to which the proportion of the Hungarians was 51.4%, but he neglects the 1910 census as he thinks the changes since the last census are too big. It is also argued that there were different results in previous censuses in the Kingdom of Hungary and subsequent censuses in the new states. Considering the size of discrepancies, some demographers are on the opinion that these censuses were somewhat biased in the favour of the respective ruling nation.

==== Distribution of the non-Hungarian and Hungarian populations ====
The number of non-Hungarian and Hungarian communities in the different areas based on the census data of 1910 (in this, people were not directly asked about their ethnicity, but about their native language). The present day location of each area is given in parentheses.

| Region | Main spoken language | Hungarian language | Other languages |
|---|---|---|---|
| Transylvania and parts of Partium, Banat (Romania) | Romanian – 2,819,467 (54%) | 1,658,045 (31.7%) | German – 550,964 (10.5%) |
| Upper Hungary (restricted to the territory of today's Slovakia) | Slovak – 1,688,413 (57.9%) | 881,320 (30.2%) | German – 198,405 (6.8%) |
| Délvidék (Vojvodina, Serbia) | Serbo-Croatian – 601,770 (39.8%); Serbian – 510,754 (33.8%); Croatian, Bunjevac and Šokac – 91,016 (6%) | 425,672 (28.1%) | German – 324,017 (21.4%) |
| Kárpátalja (Ukraine) | Ruthenian – 330,010 (54.5%) | 185,433 (30.6%) | German – 64,257 (10.6%) |
| Kingdom of Croatia-Slavonia and Muraköz and part of Baranya (Croatia) | Croatian – 1,638,350 (62.3%) | 121,000 (3.5%) | Serbian – 644,955 (24.6%); German – 134,078 (5.1%) |
| Fiume (Croatia) | Italian – 24,212 (48.6%) | 6,493 (13%) | Croatian and Serbian – 13,351 (26.8%); Slovene – 2,336 (4.7%); German – 2,315 (4.6%) |
| Őrvidék (Burgenland, Austria) | German – 217,072 (74.4%) | 26,225 (9%) | Croatian – 43,633 (15%) |
| Muravidék (Prekmurje, Slovenia) | Slovene – 74,199 (80.4%) – in 1921 | 14,065 (15.2%) – in 1921 | German – 2,540 (2.8%) – in 1921 |

===== Cities and towns of the Kingdom of Hungary ceded to Austria (1920 Treaty of Trianon) =====
Settlements in historical Burgenland with populations over 2,000 (1910 census)
| Rank | Hungarian name (1910) | Current name | Population (1910) | Hungarian (%) | German (%) | Croatian (%) | Other (%) | Notes |
|---|---|---|---|---|---|---|---|---|
| 1 | Felsőőr | Oberwart | 4,962 | 68.5% | 28.3% | 1.1% | 2.1% | Hungarian majority (ceded anyway) |
| 2 | Kismarton | Eisenstadt | 3,368 | 12.4% | 84.1% | 1.5% | 2.0% | Capital of Burgenland |
| 3 | Léka | Rechnitz | 2,890 | 15.3% | 81.6% | 1.2% | 1.9% | Historic German town |
| 4 | Németújvár | Güssing | 2,817 | 14.2% | 82.1% | 1.3% | 2.4% | German majority |
| 5 | Nagymarton | Mattersburg | 2,312 | 18.9% | 78.3% | 1.0% | 1.8% | Central Burgenland |

===== Cities of the Kingdom of Hungary ceded to Czechoslovakia (1910 census) =====
Major cities in historical Upper Hungary (Felvidék)
| Rank | Hungarian name (1910) | Current name | Population (1910) | Hungarian (%) | Slovak (%) | German (%) | Other (%) | Notes |
|---|---|---|---|---|---|---|---|---|
| 1 | Pozsony | Bratislava | 78,223 | 40.5% | 15.2% | 41.9% | 2.4% | Capital of Upper Hungary |
| 2 | Kassa | Košice | 41,360 | 75.4% | 13.2% | 8.1% | 3.3% | Cultural center of Upper Hungary |
| 3 | Nagyszombat | Trnava | 28,776 | 31.6% | 55.3% | 10.1% | 3.0% | Historic Slovak town |
| 4 | Munkács | Mukachevo | 21,901 | 63.5% | 9.1% | 4.0% | 23.4% | Now in Ukraine (post-1945) |
| 5 | Ungvár | Uzhhorod | 17,275 | 62.2% | 14.8% | 5.3% | 17.7% | Now in Ukraine (post-1945) |
| 6 | Eperjes | Prešov | 16,323 | 48.1% | 38.9% | 9.4% | 3.6% | Šariš region founded as Preschau by Saxons and Zipser Germans |
| 7 | Losonc | Lučenec | 11,006 | 85.3% | 8.7% | 3.2% | 2.8% | Novohrad region |
| 8 | Galánta | Galanta | 10,900 | 91.7% | 5.1% | 1.2% | 2.0% | Agricultural center |
| 9 | Rimaszombat | Rimavská Sobota | 9,162 | 89.4% | 6.1% | 2.0% | 2.5% | Gömör-Kishont County |
| 10 | Selmecbánya | Banská Štiavnica | 8,856 | 36.4% | 52.1% | 8.3% | 3.2% | Mining town |
| 11 | Igló | Spišská Nová Ves | 7,094 | 18.3% | 71.6% | 7.8% | 2.3% | city, founded as Iglau by Zipser Germans |
| 12 | Lőcse | Levoča | 6,507 | 23.8% | 64.1% | 9.5% | 2.6% | A city, founded as Leutschau by Zipser Germans |
| 13 | Zólyom | Zvolen | 5,976 | 22.1% | 69.8% | 5.4% | 2.7% | Central Slovakia |
| 14 | Késmárk | Kežmarok | 5,934 | 13.2% | 78.9% | 6.3% | 1.6% | city founded as Kejsenmark by Zipser Germans |
| 15 | Szepesváralja | Spišské Podhradie | 3,007 | 8.5% | 85.1% | 4.2% | 2.2% | Near Spiš Castle |

===== Cities of the Kingdom of Hungary ceded to Romania (1910 census) =====
Top cities in historical Transylvania, Banat, and Partium regions
| Rank | Hungarian name (1910) | Current name | Population (1910) | Hungarian (%) | Romanian (%) | Saxon/German (%) | Other (%) | Notes |
|---|---|---|---|---|---|---|---|---|
| 1 | Temesvár | Timișoara | 72,555 | 41.5% | 29.3% | 22.4% | 6.8% | Capital of Banat |
| 2 | Nagyvárad | Oradea | 64,169 | 49.3% | 25.9% | 15.1% | 9.7% | Partium region |
| 3 | Arad | Arad | 63,166 | 56.4% | 23.1% | 10.2% | 10.3% | Partium region |
| 4 | Kolozsvár | Cluj-Napoca | 60,808 | 81.6% | 11.4% | 5.2% | 1.8% | Capital of Transylvania |
| 5 | Brassó | Brașov | 41,056 | 26.7% | 17.4% | 43.3% | 12.6% | Saxon cultural center |
| 6 | Nagyszeben | Sibiu | 33,489 | 14.3% | 19.2% | 56.4% | 10.1% | Saxon administrative hub |
| 7 | Szatmárnémeti | Satu Mare | 28,339 | 76.7% | 12.1% | 6.4% | 4.8% | Partium region |
| 8 | Marosvásárhely | Târgu Mureș | 25,517 | 85.2% | 8.7% | 4.3% | 1.8% | Székely-majority city |
| 9 | Nagykároly | Carei | 17,100 | 85.9% | 7.3% | 3.1% | 3.7% | Partium region |
| 10 | Dés | Dej | 12,937 | 77.8% | 18.4% | 1.2% | 2.6% | Transylvania |
| 11 | Sepsiszentgyörgy | Sfântu Gheorghe | 13,838 | 93.5% | 4.2% | 0.9% | 1.4% | Székely cultural center |
| 12 | Nagybánya | Baia Mare | 12,877 | 71.2% | 18.9% | 3.1% | 6.8% | Partium region |
| 13 | Székelyudvarhely | Odorheiu Secuiesc | 12,056 | 97.1% | 1.4% | 0.5% | 1.0% | Székely cultural center |
| 14 | Szászváros | Orăștie | 8,140 | 15.6% | 21.3% | 58.4% | 4.7% | Saxon-majority town |
| 15 | Nagyenyed | Aiud | 7,013 | 89.2% | 6.1% | 3.2% | 1.5% | Historical Hungarian town |

===== Cities of the Kingdom of Hungary ceded to Yugoslavia (1910 census) =====
Major cities in historical Bácska, Banat, and Croatia-Slavonia
| Rank | Hungarian name (1910) | Current name | Population (1910) | Hungarian (%) | Southern Slav (%) | German (%) | Other (%) | Notes |
|---|---|---|---|---|---|---|---|---|
| 1 | Szabadka | Subotica | 63,579 | 56.8% | 17.2% | 18.3% | 7.7% | Largest city in Bácska |
| 2 | Eszék | Osijek | 40,379 | 12.4% | 47.62% | 37.8% | 2.2% | Croatia-Slavonia |
| 3 | Újvidék | Novi Sad | 33,090 | 34.5% | 39.2% | 20.1% | 6.2% | Capital of Bácska |
| 4 | Zombor | Sombor | 32,623 | 58.3% | 23.4% | 12.1% | 6.2% | Bácska region |
| 5 | Nagybecskerek | Zrenjanin | 28,555 | 48.7% | 25.3% | 19.8% | 6.2% | Banat region |
| 6 | Versec | Vršac | 27,370 | 39.1% | 35.2% | 18.7% | 7.0% | Banat region |
| 7 | Pancsova | Pančevo | 20,808 | 45.6% | 28.9% | 18.4% | 7.1% | Banat region |
| 8 | Valkóvár | Vukovar | 10,359 | 15.02% | 59.44% | 20.26% | 5.4% | Croatia-Slavonia |

==== Hungarians outside the newly defined borders ====
Hungary lost 67% of its territory (71% with Croatia), its sea access, half of its 10 biggest cities and all of its precious metal mines; 3,425,000 ethnic Hungarians found themselves separated from their motherland. Based on the 1910 Hungarian census with the Administrative Kingdom of Hungary in green and autonomous Croatia-Slavonia in grey

The territories of the former Hungarian Kingdom that were ceded by the treaty to neighbouring countries in total (and each of them separately) had a majority of non-Hungarian nationals; however, the Hungarian ethnic area was much larger than the newly established territory of Hungary, therefore 30% of the ethnic Hungarians were under foreign authority.

After the treaty, the percentage and the absolute number of all Hungarian populations outside of Hungary decreased in the next decades (although, some of these populations also recorded temporary increase of the absolute population number). There are several reasons for this population decrease, some of which were spontaneous assimilation and certain state policies, like Slovakization, Romanianization, Serbianisation. Other important factors were the Hungarian migration from the neighbouring states to Hungary or to some western countries as well as decreased birth rate of Hungarian populations. According to the National Office for Refugees, the number of Hungarians who immigrated to Hungary from neighbouring countries was about 350,000 between 1918 and 1924.

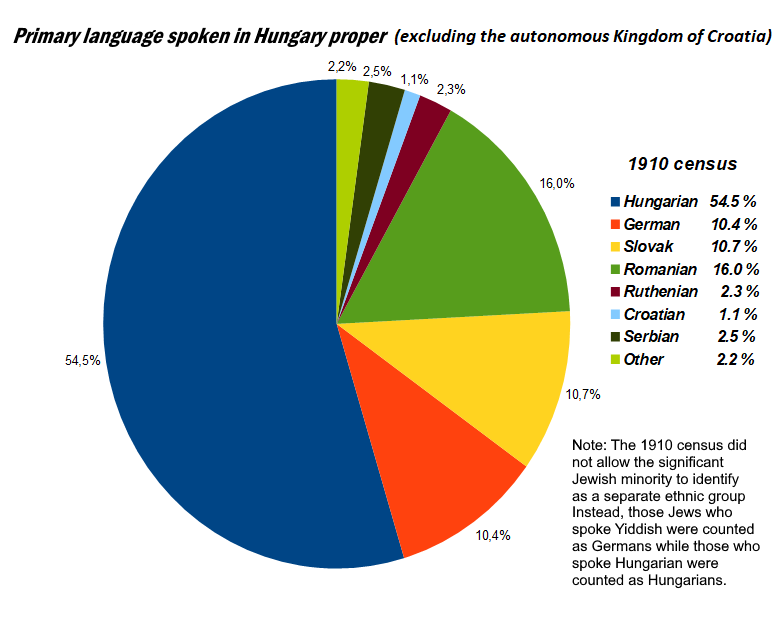
In the Kingdom of Hungary, the 1910 census was based on mother tongue. According to the census, 54.4% of the inhabitants of Hungary were recorded to speak Hungarian as their native language. This number included the Jewish ethnic group (around 5% of the population according to a separate census on religion and about 23% of Budapest's citizenry) who were overwhelmingly Hungarian-speaking (the Jews tending to declare German as mother tongue due to the immigration of Jews of Yiddish/German mother tongue).

==== Minorities in post-Trianon Hungary ====
On the other hand, a considerable number of other nationalities remained within the frontiers of the independent Hungary:

According to the 1920 census 10.4% of the population spoke one of the minority languages as mother language:

- 551,212 German (6.9%)
- 141,882 Slovak (1.8%)
- 36,858 Croatian (0.5%)
- 23,760 Romanian (0.3%)
- 23,228 Bunjevac and Šokac (0.3%)
- 17,131 Serbian (0.2%)
- 7,000 Slovene (0.08%)

The percentage and the absolute number of all non-Hungarian nationalities decreased in the next decades, although the total population of the country increased. Bilingualism was also disappearing. The main reasons of this process were both spontaneous assimilation and the deliberate Magyarization policy of the state. Minorities made up 8% of the total population in 1930 and 7% in 1941 (on the post-Trianon territory).

After World War II approximately 200,000 Germans were deported to Germany, according to the decree of the Potsdam Conference. Under the forced exchange of population between Czechoslovakia and Hungary, approximately 73,000 Slovaks left Hungary and according to different estimations 120,500 or 45,000 Hungarians moved to present day Hungarian territory from Czechoslovakia. After these population movements, Hungary became a nearly ethnically homogeneous country.

=== Political consequences ===
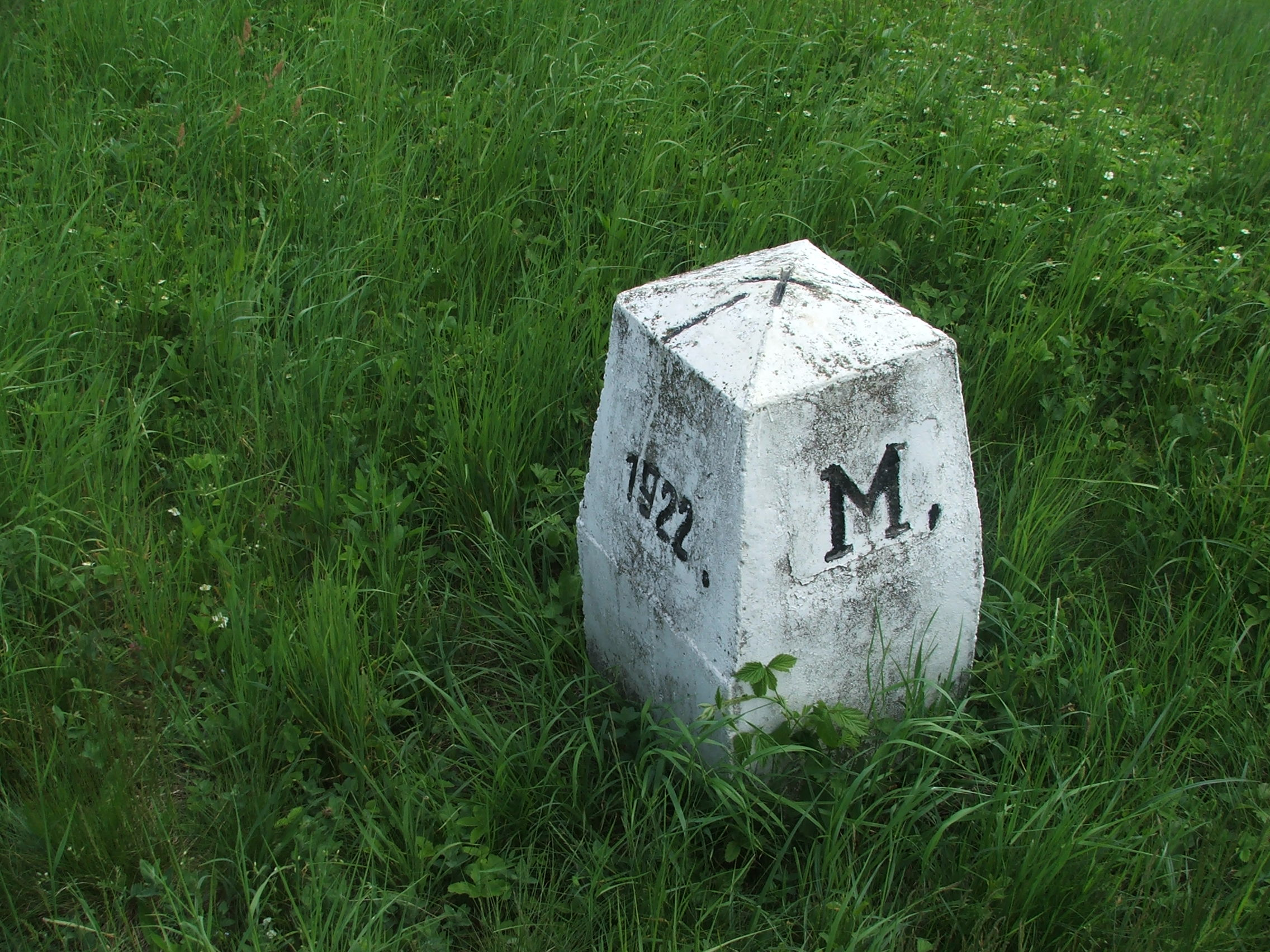
Bordermark on the Hungarian-Romanian border near Csenger

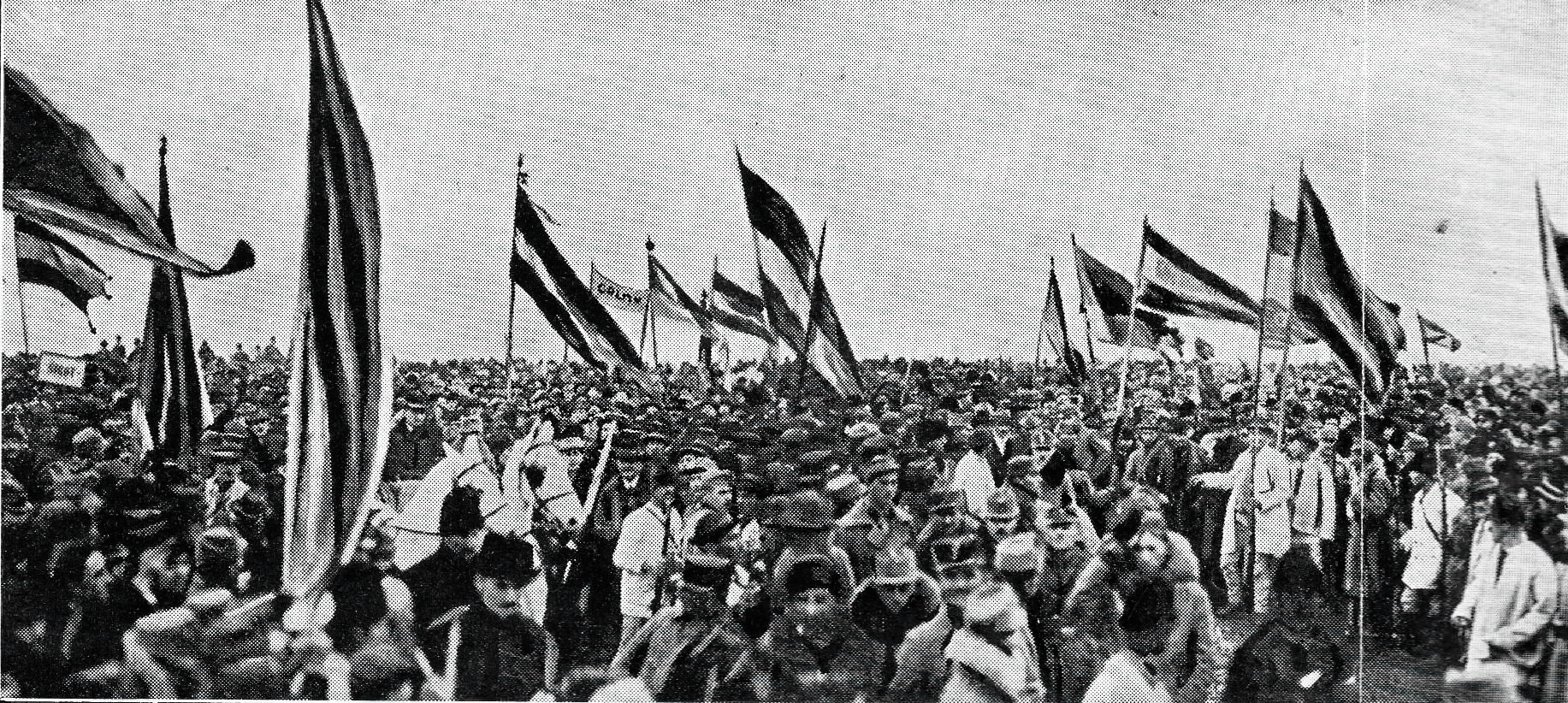
The Great National Assembly of Alba Iulia (1 December 1918) – Union of Transylvania with Romania, seen as an act of national liberation by the Transylvanian Romanians

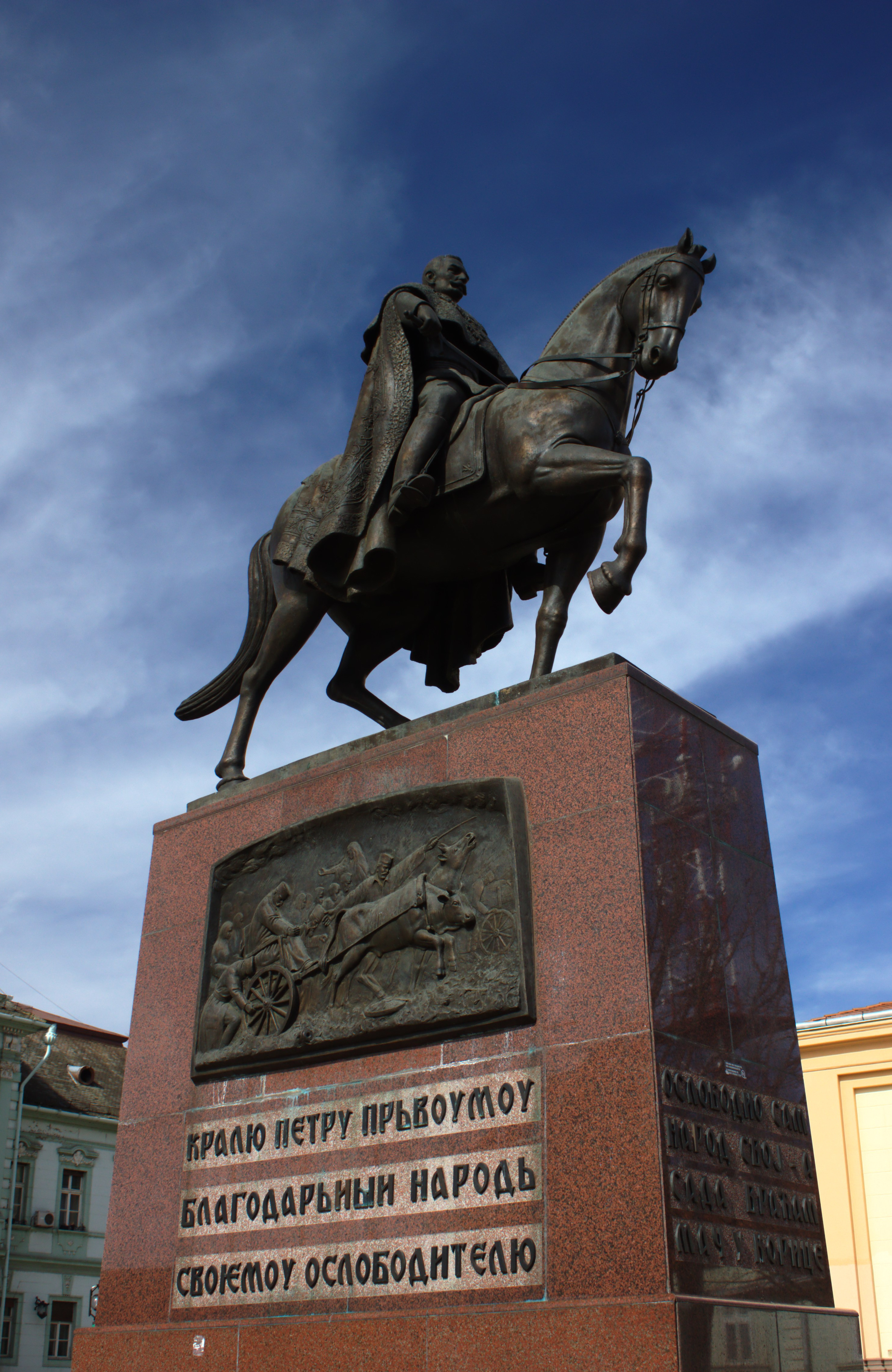
A statue of King Peter I, Karađorđević of Serbia at Freedom Square in Zrenjanin, Serbia. The inscription says: "To the King Peter I, gratious people, to its liberator". Separation from the Kingdom of Hungary and unification with the Kingdom of Serbia was seen as an act of national liberation by the Vojvodinian Serbs.

Officially the treaty was intended to be a confirmation of the right of self-determination for nations and of the concept of nation-states replacing the old multinational Austro-Hungarian empire. Although the treaty addressed some nationality issues, it also sparked some new ones.

The minority ethnic groups of the pre-war kingdom were the major beneficiaries. The Allies had explicitly committed themselves to the causes of the minority peoples of Austria-Hungary late in World War I. For all intents and purposes, the death knell of the Austro-Hungarian empire sounded on 14 October 1918, when United States Secretary of State Robert Lansing informed Austro-Hungarian Foreign Minister István Burián that autonomy for the nationalities was no longer enough. Accordingly, the Allies assumed without question that the minority ethnic groups of the pre-war kingdom wanted to leave Hungary. The Romanians joined their ethnic brethren in Romania, while the Slovaks, Serbs and Croats helped establish states of their own (Czechoslovakia and Yugoslavia). However, these new or enlarged countries also absorbed large slices of territory with a majority of ethnic Hungarians or Hungarian speaking population. As a result, as many as a third of Hungarian language-speakers found themselves outside the borders of the post-Trianon Hungary.

While the territories that were now outside Hungary's borders had non-Hungarian majorities overall, there also existed some sizeable areas with a majority of Hungarians, largely near the newly defined borders. Over the last century, concerns have been raised frequently about the treatment of these ethnic Hungarian communities in the neighbouring states. Areas with significant Hungarian populations included the Székely Land in eastern Transylvania, the area along the newly defined Romanian-Hungarian border (cities of Arad, Oradea), the area north of the newly defined Czechoslovak–Hungarian border (Komárno, Csallóköz), southern parts of Subcarpathia and northern parts of Vojvodina.

The Allies rejected the idea of plebiscites in the disputed areas with the exception of the city of Sopron, which voted in favour of Hungary. The Allies were indifferent as to the exact line of the newly defined border between Austria and Hungary. Furthermore, ethnically diverse Transylvania, with an overall Romanian majority (53.8% – 1910 census data or 57.1% – 1919 census data or 57.3% – 1920 census data), was treated as a single entity at the peace negotiations and was assigned in its entirety to Romania. The option of partition along ethnic lines as an alternative was rejected.

Another reason why the victorious Allies decided to dissolve the Austria-Hungary was to prevent Germany from acquiring substantial influence in the future, since Austria-Hungary was a strong German supporter and fast developing region. The Western powers' main priority was to prevent a resurgence of the German Reich, and they therefore decided that her allies in the region should be "contained" by a ring of states friendly to the Allies, each of which would be bigger than either Austria or Hungary. Compared to the Habsburg Kingdom of Hungary, post-Trianon Hungary had 60% less population, and its political and economic footprint in the region was significantly reduced. Hungary lost connection to strategic military and economic infrastructure because of the concentric layout of the railway and road network, which the borders bisected. In addition, the structure of its economy collapsed because it had relied on other parts of the pre-war kingdom. The country lost access to the Mediterranean and to the important sea port of Rijeka (Fiume) and became landlocked, which had a negative effect on sea trading and strategic naval operations. Many trading routes that went through the newly defined borders from various parts of the pre-war kingdom were abandoned.

With regard to the ethnic issues, the Western powers were aware of the problem posed by the presence of so many Hungarians (and Germans) living outside the newly formed states of Hungary and Austria. The Romanian delegation to Versailles feared in 1919 that the Allies were beginning to favour the partition of Transylvania along ethnic lines to reduce the potential exodus, and Prime Minister Ion I. C. Brătianu even summoned British-born Queen Marie to France to strengthen their case. The Romanians had suffered a higher relative casualty rate in the war than either Britain or France so it was considered that the Western powers had a moral debt to repay. In absolute terms, Romanian troops had considerably fewer casualties than either Britain or France, however. The underlying reason for the decision was a secret pact between The Entente and Romania. In the Treaty of Bucharest (1916) Romania was promised Transylvania and some other territories to the east of river Tisza, provided that she attacked Austria-Hungary from the south-east, where defences were weak. However, after the Central Powers had noticed the military manoeuvre, the attempt was quickly choked off and Bucharest fell in the same year.

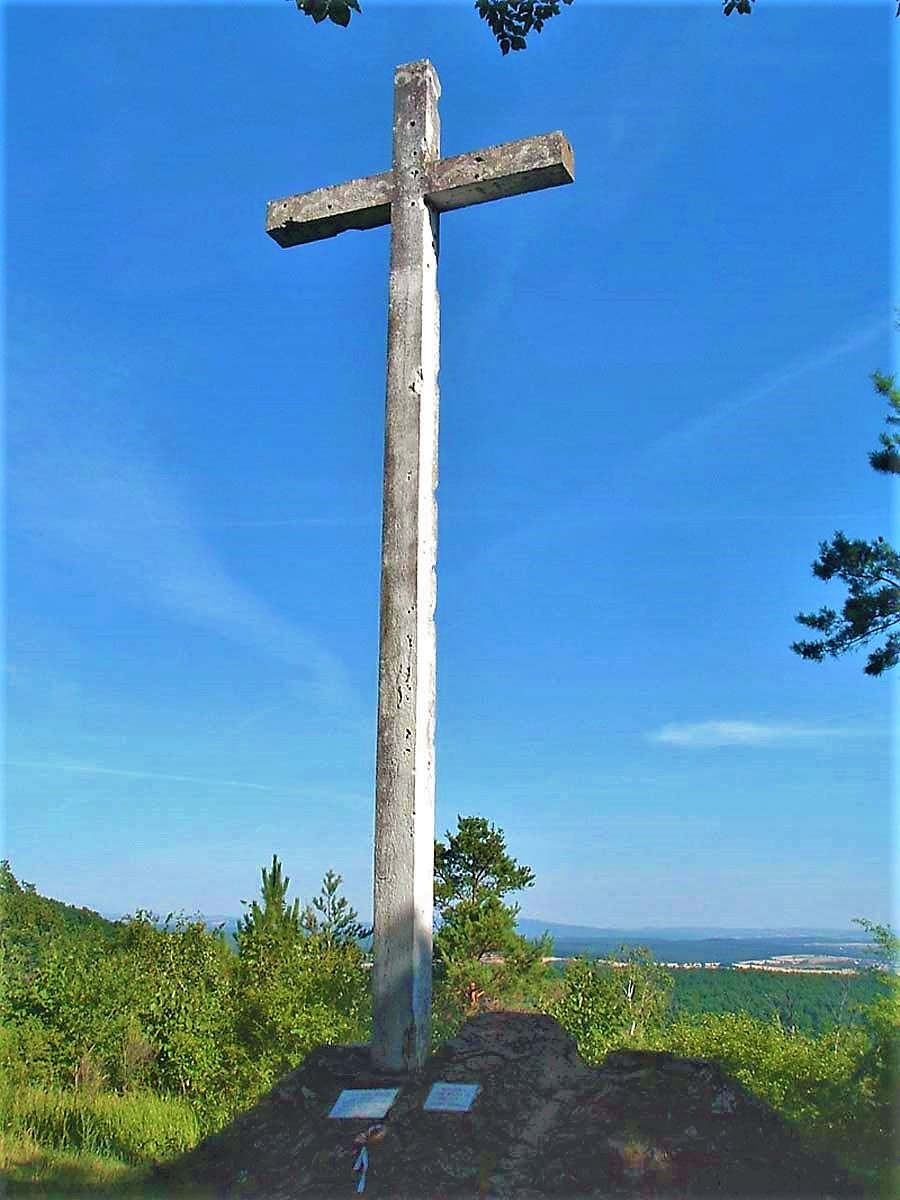
The Trianon cross at Kőszeg is pointing onto the former territories of the pre-war Kingdom of Hungary that were not assigned to post-Trianon Hungary.

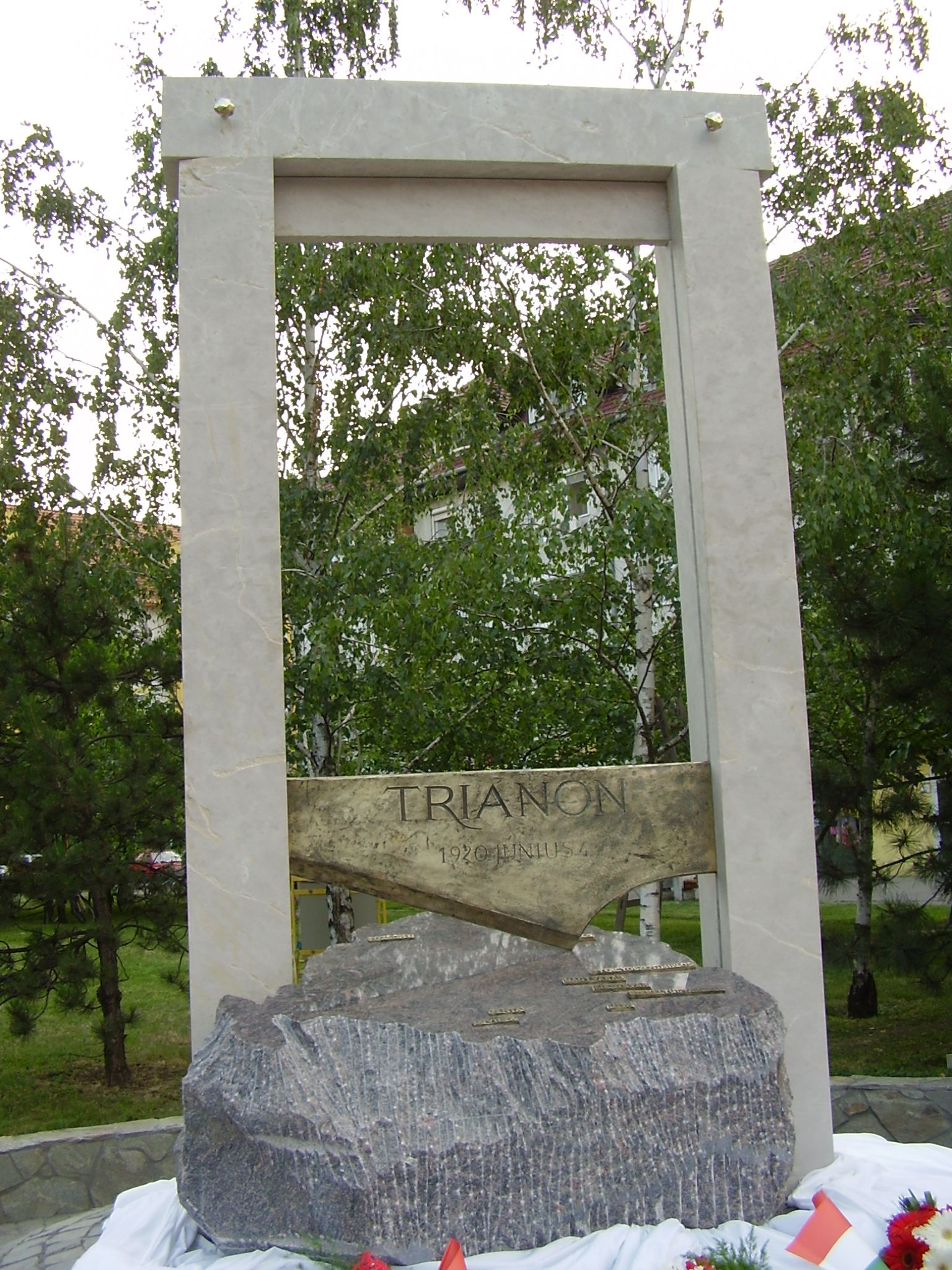
Trianon memorial, Békéscsaba

By the time the victorious Allies arrived in France, the treaty was already settled, which made the outcome inevitable. At the heart of the dispute lay fundamentally different views on the nature of the Hungarian presence in the disputed territories. For Hungarians, the outer territories were not seen as colonial territories but rather part of the core national territory. The non-Hungarians that lived in the Pannonian Basin saw the Hungarians as colonial-style rulers who had oppressed the Slavs and Romanians since 1848, when they introduced laws that the language used in education and in local offices was to be Hungarian. For non-Hungarians from the Pannonian Basin it was a process of decolonisation instead of a punitive dismemberment (as was seen by the Hungarians). The Hungarians did not see it this way because the newly defined borders did not fully respect territorial distribution of ethnic groups, with areas where there were Hungarian majorities outside the new borders. The French sided with their allies the Romanians who had a long policy of cultural ties to France since the country broke from the Ottoman Empire (partly because of the relative ease at which Romanians could learn French) although Clemenceau personally detested Brătianu. President Wilson initially supported the outline of a border that would have more respect to ethnic distribution of population based on the Coolidge Report, led by Archibald Cary Coolidge, a Harvard professor, but later gave in because of changing international politics and as a courtesy to other allies.

For Hungarian public opinion, the fact that almost three-fourths of the pre-war kingdom's territory and a significant number of ethnic Hungarians were assigned to neighbouring countries triggered considerable bitterness. Most Hungarians preferred to maintain the territorial integrity of the pre-war kingdom. The Hungarian politicians claimed that they were ready to give the non-Hungarian ethnicities a great deal of autonomy. Most Hungarians regarded the treaty as an insult to the nation's honour. The Hungarian political attitude towards Trianon was summed up in the phrases Nem, nem, soha! ("No, no, never!") and Mindent vissza! ("Return everything!" or "Everything back!"). The perceived humiliation of the treaty became a dominant theme in inter-war Hungarian politics, analogous with the German reaction to the Treaty of Versailles.

By the arbitrations of Germany and Italy, Hungary expanded its borders towards neighbouring countries before and during World War II. This started by the First Vienna Award, then was continued with the dissolution of Czechoslovakia in 1939 (annexation of the remainder of Carpathian Ruthenia and a small strip from eastern Slovakia), afterwards by the Second Vienna Award in 1940, and finally by the annexations of territories after the breakup of Yugoslavia. This territorial expansion was short-lived, since the post-war Hungarian boundaries in the Paris Peace Treaties, 1947 were nearly identical to those of 1920 (with three villages – Horvátjárfalu, Oroszvár, and Dunacsún – transferred to Czechoslovakia).

==== Legacy ====
Francesco Saverio Nitti served as Prime Minister of Italy between 1919 and 1920. Italy was a member of the Entente and participated in the treaty, he wrote in Peaceless Europe (1922):

Hungary has undergone the greatest occupation of her territories and her wealth. This poor great country, which saved both civilization and Christianity, has been treated with a bitterness which nothing can explain except the desire of greed of those surrounding her, and the fact that the weaker people, seeing the stronger overcome, wish and insist that she shall be reduced to impotence. Nothing, in fact, can justify the measures of violence and the depredations committed in Magyar territory. What was the Rumanian occupation of Hungary: a systematic rapine and the systematic destruction for a long time hidden, and the stern reproach which Lloyd George addressed in London to the Premier of Rumania was perfectly justified. After the War everyone wanted some sacrifice from Hungary, and no one dared to say a word of peace or goodwill for her. When I tried it was too late. The victors hated Hungary for her proud defence. The adherents of Socialism do not love her because she had to resist, under more than difficult conditions, internal and external Bolshevism. The international financiers hate her because of the violences committed against the Jews. So Hungary suffers all the injustices without defence, all the miseries without help, and all the intrigues without resistance. Before the War Hungary had an area almost equal to that of Italy, 282,870 square kilometres, with a population of 18,264,533 inhabitants. The Treaty of Trianon reduced her territory to 91,114 kilometres – that is, 32.3% – and the population to 7,481,954, or 41%. It was not sufficient to cut off from Hungary the populations which were not ethnically Magyar. Without any reason 1,084,447 Magyars have been handed over to Czeko-Slovakia, 457,597 to Jugo-Slavia, 1,704,851 to Rumania. Also other nuclei of population have been detached without reason.

==== In modern historiography ====
The treaty's perceived disproportion has had a lasting impact on Hungarian politics and culture, with some commentators even likening it to a "collective pathology" that places Trianon into a much larger narrative of Hungarian victimhood at the hands of foreign powers. Within Hungary, Trianon is often referred to as a "diktat", "tragedy", and "trauma". According to a study, two-thirds of Hungarians agreed in 2020 that parts of neighbouring countries should belong to them, the highest percentage in any NATO country. Such irredentism was one of the main contributing factors to Hungary's decision to enter World War II as an Axis power as Adolf Hitler had promised to intervene on Hungary's behalf to restore majority-ethnic Hungarian lands lost after Trianon.

Hungarian bitterness at Trianon was also a source of regional tension after the Cold War ended in 1989. For example, Hungary attracted international media attention in 1999 for passing the "status law" concerning estimated three-million ethnic Hungarian minorities in neighbouring Romania, Slovakia, Serbia, Croatia, Slovenia and Ukraine. The law aimed to provide education, health benefits and employment rights to these minorities as a means of providing reparations for Trianon's negative consequences.

Trianon's legacy is similarly implicated in the question of whether to grant extraterritorial ethnic Hungarians citizenship, an important issue in contemporary Hungarian politics. In 2004, a majority of voters approved extending citizenship to ethnic Hungarians in a referendum, which nonetheless failed due to low turnout. In 2011, Viktor Orbán's newly formed government liberalized the nationality law by statute. Although Orbán depicted the new law as redressing Trianon, many commentators speculated about an additional political motivation; the law granted voting rights to extraterritorial Hungarians, who were seen as a reliable base of support for Orbán's national-conservative Fidesz party.

=== Economic consequences ===
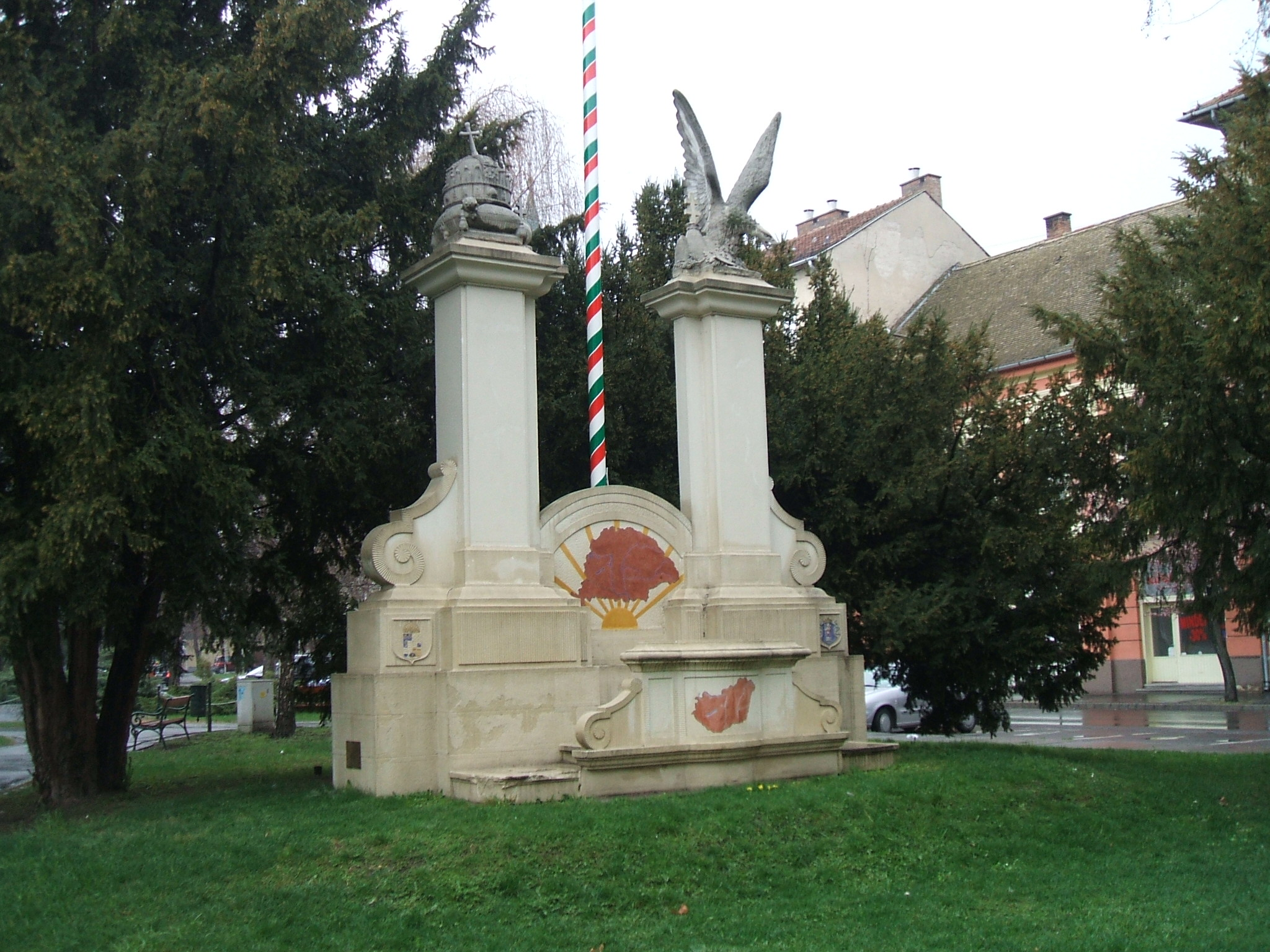
Trianon memorial, Kiskunhalas

The Austro-Hungarian Empire was one economic unit with autarkic characteristics during its golden age and therefore achieved rapid growth, especially in the early 20th century when GNP grew by 1.46%. This level of growth compared very favourably to that of other European states such as Britain (1.00%), France (1.06%), and Germany (1.51%). There was also a division of labour present throughout the empire: that is, in the Austrian part of the monarchy manufacturing industries were highly advanced, while in the Kingdom of Hungary an agro-industrial economy had emerged. By the late 19th century, economic growth of the eastern regions consistently surpassed that of western, thus discrepancies eventually began to diminish. The key success of fast development was specialisation of each region in fields that they were best.

The Kingdom of Hungary was the main supplier of wheat, rye, barley and other various goods in the empire, and these comprised a large portion of the empire's exports. Meanwhile, the territory of present-day Czech Republic (Kingdom of Bohemia) owned 75% of the whole industrial capacity of former Austria-Hungary. This shows that the various parts of the former monarchy were economically interdependent. As a further illustration of this issue, post-Trianon Hungary produced 5 times more agricultural goods than it needed for itself, and mills around Budapest (some of the largest ones in Europe at the time) operated at 20% capacity. As a consequence of the treaty, all the competitive industries of the former empire were compelled to close doors, as great capacity was met by negligible demand owing to economic barriers presented in the form of the newly defined borders.

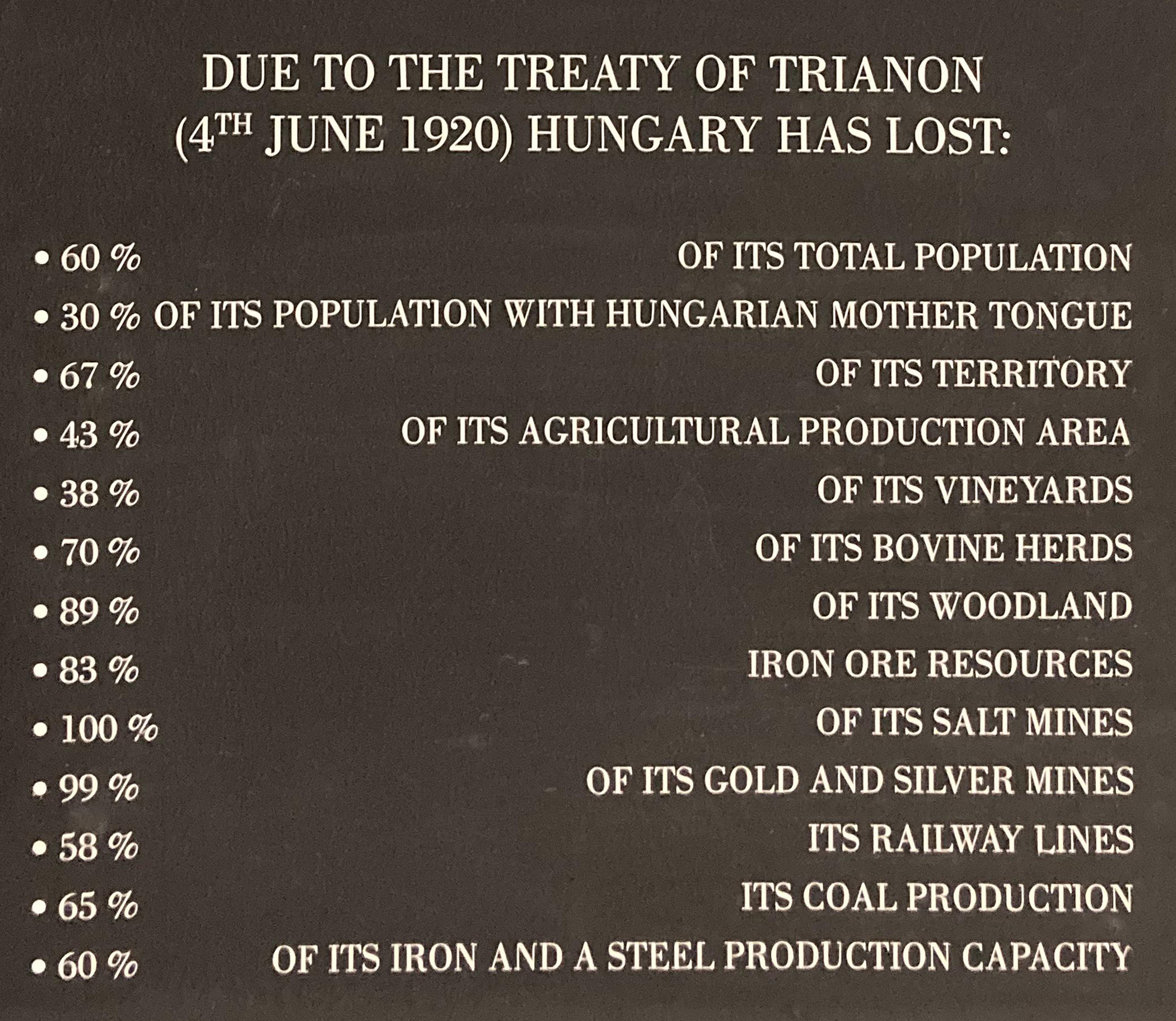
Hungarian economic consequences due to the Treaty of Trianon. "A New World Was Born" permanent exhibition in the Buda Castle. (Kingdom of Hungary without Kingdom of Croatia-Slavonia)

Post-Trianon Hungary possessed 90% of the engineering and printing industry of the pre-war kingdom, while only 11% of timber and 16% of iron was retained. In addition, 61% of arable land, 74% of public roads, 65% of canals, 62% of railroads, 64% of hard surface roads, 83% of pig iron output, 55% of industrial plants, and 67% of credit and banking institutions of the former Kingdom of Hungary lay within the territory of Hungary's neighbours. These statistics correspond to post-Trianon Hungary retaining only around a third of the kingdom's territory before the war and around 60% of its population. The new borders also bisected transport links – in the Kingdom of Hungary the road and railway network had a radial structure, with Budapest in the centre. Many roads and railways, running along the newly defined borders and interlinking radial transport lines, ended up in different, highly introvert countries. Hence, much of the rail cargo traffic of the emergent states was virtually paralysed. These factors all combined created some imbalances in the now separated economic regions of the former monarchy.

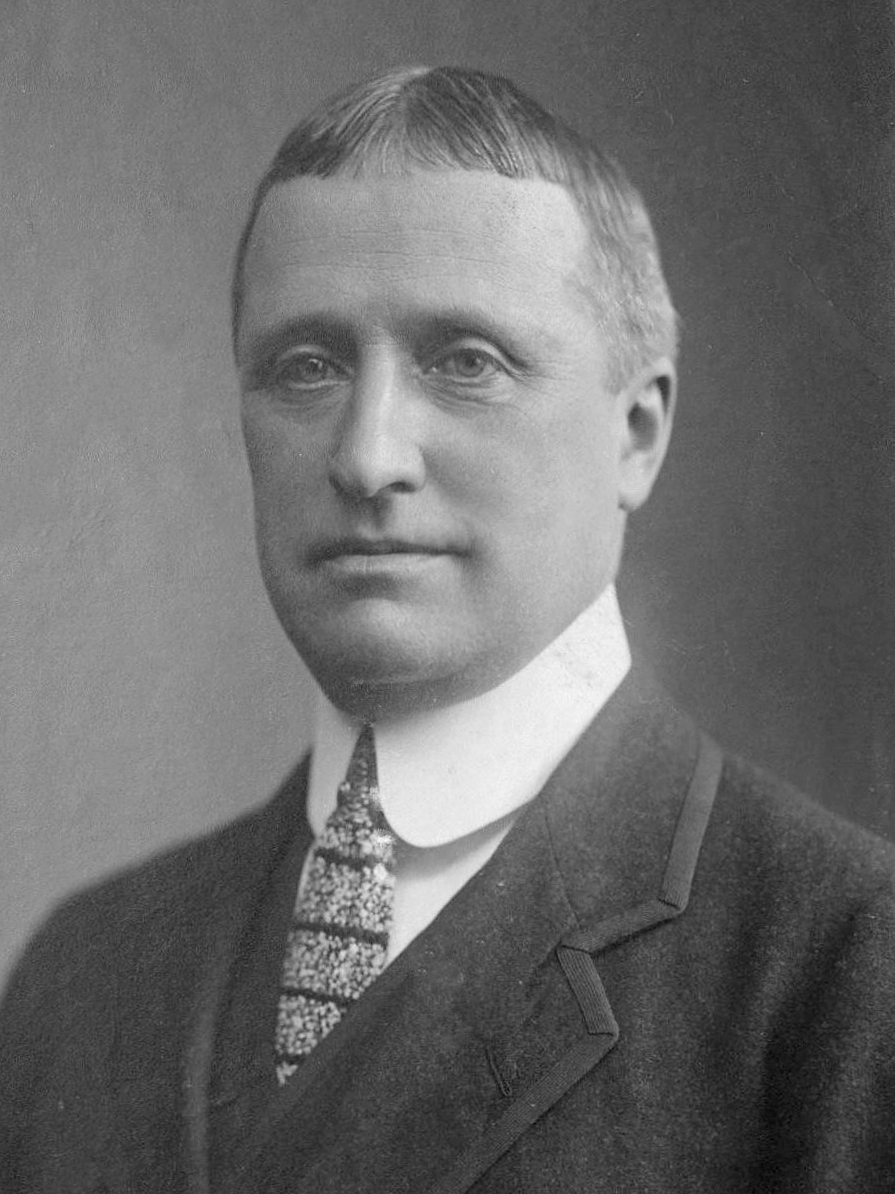
Archibald Cary Coolidge

The disseminating economic problems had been also noted in the Coolidge Report as a serious potential aftermath of the treaty. This opinion was not taken into account during the negotiations. Thus, the resulting uneasiness and despondency of one part of the concerned population was later one of the main antecedents of World War II. Unemployment levels in Austria, as well as in Hungary, were dangerously high, and industrial output dropped by 65%. What happened to Austria in industry happened to Hungary in agriculture where production of grain declined by more than 70%. Austria, especially the imperial capital Vienna, was a leading investor of development projects throughout the empire with more than 2.2 billion crown capital. This sum sunk to a mere 8.6 million crowns after the treaty took effect and resulted in a starving of capital in other regions of the former empire.

The disintegration of the multinational state conversely impacted neighbouring countries, too: In Poland, Romania, Yugoslavia, and Bulgaria a fifth to a third of the rural population could find no work, and industry was in no position to absorb them. In comparison, by 1921 the new Czechoslovak state reached 75% of its pre-war production owing to their favourable position among the victors and greater associated access to international rehabilitation resources.

With the creation of customs barriers and fragmented protective economies, the economic growth and outlook in the region sharply declined, ultimately culminating in a deep recession. It proved to be immensely challenging for the successor states to successfully transform their economies to adapt to the new circumstances. All the formal districts of Austria-Hungary used to rely on each other's exports for growth and welfare; by contrast, 5 years after the treaty, traffic of goods between the countries dropped to less than 5% of its former value. This could be attributed to the introduction of aggressive nationalistic policies by local political leaders.

The drastic shift in economic climate forced the countries to re-evaluate their situation and to promote industries where they had fallen short. Austria and Czechoslovakia subsidised the mill, sugar and brewing industries, while Hungary attempted to increase the efficiency of iron, steel, glass and chemical industries. The stated objective was that all countries should become self-sufficient. This tendency, however, led to uniform economies and competitive economic advantage of long well-established industries and research fields evaporated. The lack of specialisation adversely affected the whole Danube-Carpathian region and caused a distinct setback of growth and development compared to western and northern European regions as well as high financial vulnerability and instability.

=== Other consequences ===
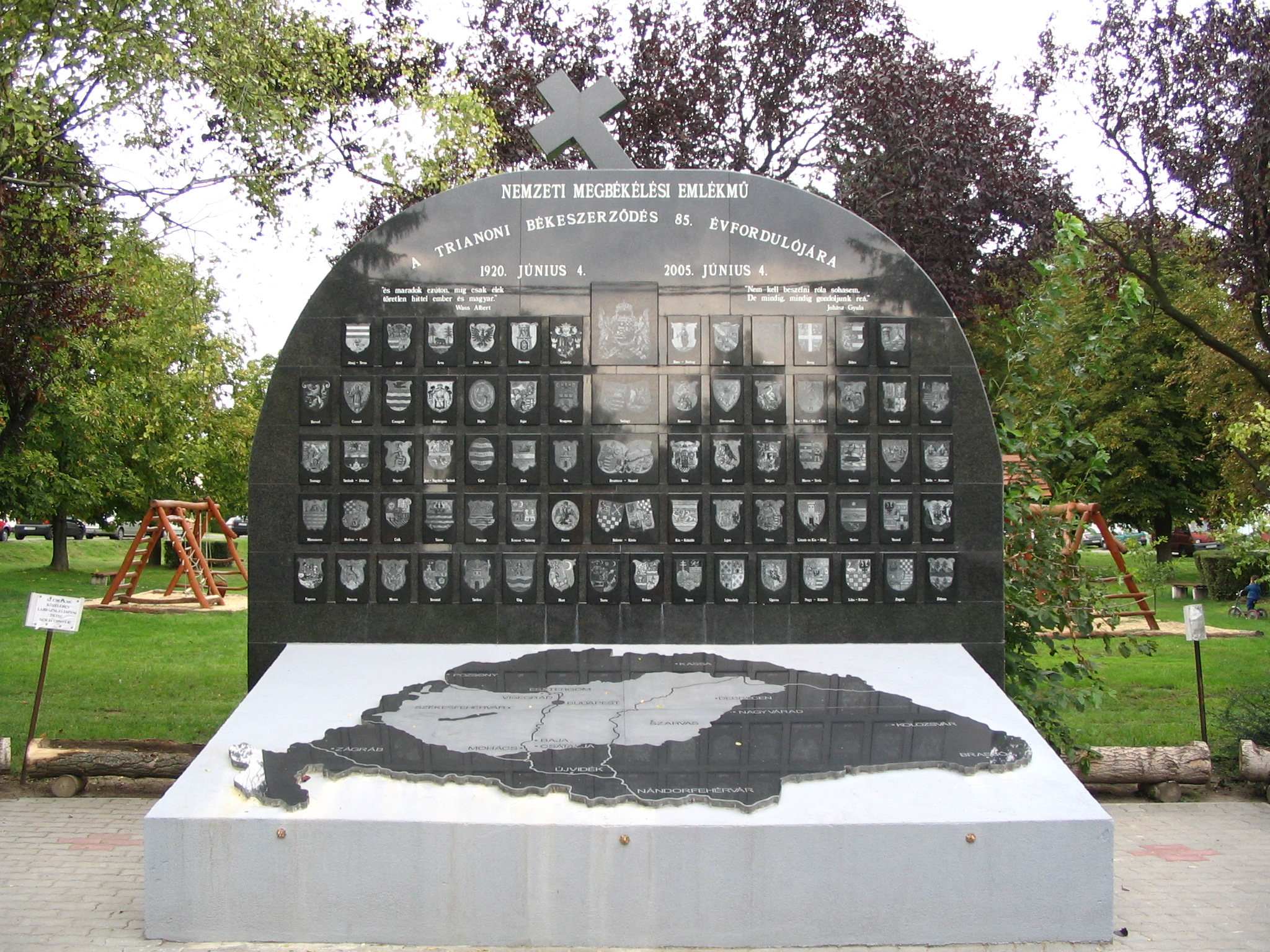
Memorial in Csátalja

Romania, Yugoslavia and Czechoslovakia had to assume part of the financial obligations of the former Kingdom of Hungary on account of the parts of its former territory that were assigned under their sovereignty. Some conditions of the treaty were similar to those imposed on Germany by the Treaty of Versailles. After the war, the Austro-Hungarian navy, air force and army were disbanded. The army of post-Trianon Hungary was to be restricted to 35,000 men, and there was to be no conscription. Heavy artillery, tanks and air force were prohibited. No railway was to be built with more than one track, because at that time railways held substantial strategic importance economically and militarily.

Articles 54–60 of the treaty required Hungary to recognise various rights of national minorities within its borders. Articles 61–66 state that all former citizens of the Kingdom of Hungary living outside the newly defined frontiers of Hungary were to ipso facto lose their Hungarian citizenship in one year. Under articles 79 to 101 Hungary renounced all privileges of the former Austro-Hungarian monarchy in territories outside Europe, including Morocco, Egypt, Siam and China.

== See also ==
- Union of Hungary and Romania
- Millerand letter
- Aftermath of World War I
- Minority Treaties
- Banat Republic
- Republic of Prekmurje
- Serbian–Hungarian Baranya–Baja Republic
- Trianon Syndrome
- Trianon Treaty Day

== Sources ==
- Taylor, A.J.P. (1948). The Habsburg Monarchy 1809–1918 – A History of the Austrian Empire and Austria-Hungary. London: Hamish Hamilton.

== Bibliography ==
- Deak, Francis (1942). Hungary at the Paris Peace Conference: The Diplomatic History of the Treaty of Trianon. Howard Fertig.
- Frucht, Richard C. (2004). Eastern Europe: An Introduction to the People, Lands, and Culture. ABC-CLIO. ISBN 978-1-57607-800-6.
- Hronský, Marián (2001). The Struggle for Slovakia and the Treaty of Trianon. VEDA Publishing House of the Slovak Academy of Sciences. ISBN 80-224-0677-5.
- Kocsis, Károly; Kocsis-Hodosi, Eszter (1998). Ethnic Geography of the Hungarian Minorities in the Carpathian Basin. Geographical Research Institute, Research Centre and Earth Sciences. ISBN 978-963-7395-84-0.
- Brass, Paul R. (1985). Ethnic Groups and the State. Taylor & Francis. ISBN 978-0-7099-3272-7.
- Szilassy, Sándor (1971). Revolutionary Hungary 1918–1921. Aston Park, Florida: Danubian Press. ISBN 978-08-79-34005-6.
- Tucker, Spencer; Roberts, Priscilla Mary (2005). Encyclopedia of World War I (1 ed.). ABC-CLIO. ISBN 978-1-85109-420-2.
