= Otto Roth =

Hungarian-Romanian lawyer and politician (1884–1956)

Dr. Otto Roth
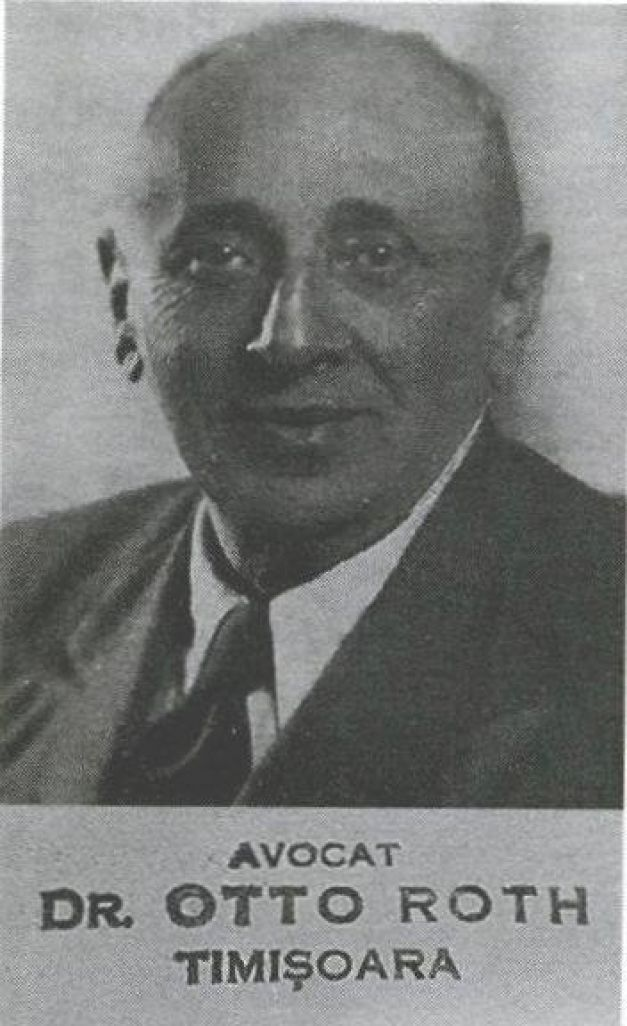
- Portrait photograph, c. 1930

Commissioner-in-Chief of the Banat Republic
- In office 31 October 1918 – 17 January 1919
- Preceded by: György Kórossy (as Alispán)
- Succeeded by: Martin Filipon (as Župan)

Personal details
- Born: December 6, 1884 Nagy-Mutnik, Transleithania, Austria-Hungary
- Died: April 22, 1956 (aged 71) Timișoara, Romanian People's Republic
- Party: Social Democratic Party of Hungary
- Other political affiliations: Romanian Social Democratic Party
- Spouse: Rozalia Singer
- Children: 3
- Education: Eötvös Loránd University; Leipzig University; Franz Joseph University
- Occupation: Lawyer, journalist, trade unionist, civil servant
- Nickname: R. Otto Lippai

Otto Roth, occasionally rendered as Willy Otto Roth or Dr. Rot (Hungarian: Róth Ottó; 6 December 1884 – 22 April 1956), was a Hungarian and Romanian lawyer, journalist and politician who served as the only Commissioner-in-Chief of the Banat Republic, between October 1918 and January 1919. Born a subject of the Kingdom of Hungary, Jewish but non-religious, he was thirteen when he debuted as a literary journalist and magazine editor, with Viribus Unitis. In his twenties, he put out publications and founded literary circles, frequenting Endre Ady, Gyula Juhász, and Zoltán Franyó. Roth entered politics with the Hungarian Social Democratic Party (MSZDP), and was a local councilor in Timișoara during most of World War I, emerging as a regional leader of the MSZDP before and during the Aster Revolution.

Roth is credited with proclaiming the Banat Republic on 31 October 1918—though the initiative was also attributed to Albert Bartha, who briefly served as its military leader. The state was an autonomous extension of the Hungarian Republic, set up in order to prevent invasion by the French Danube Army, but also aiming to preserve regional integrity against rival nationalisms. It was generally rejected by Romanians and Serbs, who organized their own representative institutions. Unlike Bartha, Roth acknowledged the terms of the Hungarian armistice, and was subsequently allowed to maintain his executive position by the Kingdom of Serbia, which occupied Timișoara in November. His post became largely symbolic, as the Kingdom of Serbs, Croats and Slovenes (also referred to as Yugoslavia), proclaimed that December, actively pursued an annexation of the Banat; the Commissioner's importance was revived once French forces intervened as peacekeepers. With Swabian support, Roth made an attempt at consolidating his Republic, but was ultimately chased out by Yugoslav soldiers in February 1919. Attempting to prevent the Banat's partition between Yugoslavia and the Kingdom of Romania, he formed alliances with the French and the Hungarian Soviet Republic during the subsequent Hungarian–Romanian War.

This episode ended with Roth's arrest by the new conservative republic in early 1920, though the Hungarian Regency cleared him of all charges, and released him. He was again imprisoned by Romanian troops, and released after promises to keep out of politics. He resumed his law practice in Timișoara, which remained on the Romanian side of the Banat partitions. His earlier activity was a subject of repeated criticism by Romanian nationalists, and became a topic of litigation. As reported by his friend Nicolae Brînzeu, Roth eventually went back on his pledge to remain apolitical; campaigning for Banat autonomy, he embraced "anti-Bolshevik communism" and anti-fascism, and supported another friend, Petru Groza, who was emerging as an important figure on the Romanian far-left. During the early stages of World War II, politician Constantin Argetoianu employed Roth as his contact with the Romanian left-wing circles. According to Brînzeu, Roth also sought to prevent clashes between Romania and Regency Hungary, and especially the rapprochement between Hungarian revisionists and Nazi Germany.

Defeated in this effort, Roth was also exposed to antisemitic persecution, and reportedly prepared himself and his Jewish community for resettlement in Madagascar. He was publicly defended by Groza during World War II, and also networked to have Groza released from prison in 1944. Following the King Michael Coup, he made a final return to politics, rallying with the Romanian Social Democratic Party. With Groza becoming Prime Minister, Roth received minor roles in either government or state-owned business, and continued to be involved in cultural affairs. He remained critical of the Soviet Union and the Romanian Communist Party, objecting to Groza's close relationship with both. Brînzeu and Roth were placed under surveillance by the Securitate.

== Biography ==
=== Early life ===
Otto Roth was born to a Jewish family in Nagy-Mutnik, in the Hungarian division of Austria-Hungary (now Mâtnicu Mare, Romania). His father was Miksa Roth, a well-to-do local liquor merchant. Otto and Árpád Roth were the two sons born from his marriage to Helén Fischer (1853–1939). The Roths were "very distant" relatives of poet Erik Majtényi. By 1930, Otto was no longer an observant Jew, although he was not hostile to religion in general. Various authors describe the German-speaking Roth as belonging to the Swabian community. According to historian Victor Neumann, Roth did not reject Zionism, seeing it as compatible with the socialist platform, but only envisaged emancipation—"an equality of rights was enough." In this, Roth was critical of Jewish assimilation, which had driven most of his correligionists to declare themselves Hungarian. Neumann also views Roth as representative for the "diversity of the Jews' condition": while some "struggle[d] for a social position and implicitly for equality of rights", Roth advanced into mainstream society to hold some "key positions".

Young Roth was educated at Kun Calvinist High School (now Aurel Vlaicu Lyceum) in Szászváros (Orăștie), where he met and befriended Groza and the future Greek Catholic priest Nicolae Brînzeu, who remained Roth's lifelong friends. When their math teacher Aladár Tokaji hit a colleague on the head, Groza and Roth, already showing his "revolutionary tendencies", organized a student strike. All members of the class walked out of the school, finally obtaining Tokaji's removal. In 1897–1898, Roth, together with Brînzeu and another future politician, Nándor Hegedűs, edited a student magazine called Viribus Unitis (Latin for "With United Forces"). The expression, used as a motto by the House of Habsburg-Lorraine, "was intended as a symbol of the unity between young people of different nationalities." As noted by Groza, their class of 1903 was educated by adherents of Liberal Christianity, giving students "opportunities to express our sense of belonging, regardless of race, religion, or nationality."

According to Groza's recollections, Roth went on to graduate in Law and Economics from the Budapest University, before furthering his studies in Berlin and at the Leipzig University. Poet Béla Serestély, who was himself a graduate of the Kun, recalls that Roth was a student in Pest; in 1903, together with another fellow graduate, András Jakab, and with Kázmér Konkoly Thege, he put out Előre ("Forward"), a "university youth newspaper". Serestély joined the writing staff, alongside philosophy students Gyula Juhász and Béla Vágó. For this enterprise, Roth used the pen name R. Otto Lippai; other contributors included Lux Terka, Renée Erdős (with fragments of her short story "Kleopátra"), and the "proletarian poet" Sándor Csizmadia.

Another account suggests that Roth took a doctorate in law at the Franz Joseph University (today Babeș-Bolyai University in Cluj-Napoca), in 1909. Having moved to Temes County in 1907, Roth was already politically active within the Hungarian Social Democratic Party (MSZDP). With its socialist platform and implicit support for emancipation, that group was unusually strong in the Banat, absorbing a large portion of the Jewish vote. Journalist Jenő Nádor recalled for the party newspaper Népszava that Roth and József Gábriel where the two main MSZDP leaders in Temes. The movement they created was "limited only to the workers", preparing them for "militant revolution"—in 1908, a more intellectual streak was added by the arrival of Zsigmond Kunfi, who gave his sociological readings in Hungarian literature. Upon returning to the Banat, Roth himself continued to involve himself in literary life, primarily be encouraging poets Zoltán Franyó and Ernő Vermes to form a literary society called Dél ("South"), which gravitated around the Symbolist doyen, Endre Ady. In 1908–1909, he and Juhász were active with both Dél and a similar club, Holnap ("Tomorrow"). Together, these groups created an Ady Festschrift and Franyó assigned it, in the original, to the local girl Rózsi Stróbl. His contribution was a short note: "We are. — Poets, fools all of them. We imagine an age when everyone will be happy. That is our wildest obsession. Do we need a greater poet?!" Later in life, Roth joked about being the only writer to whom the thrifty Ady had sent money—no more than five Austrian crowns.

=== MSZDP agitation ===
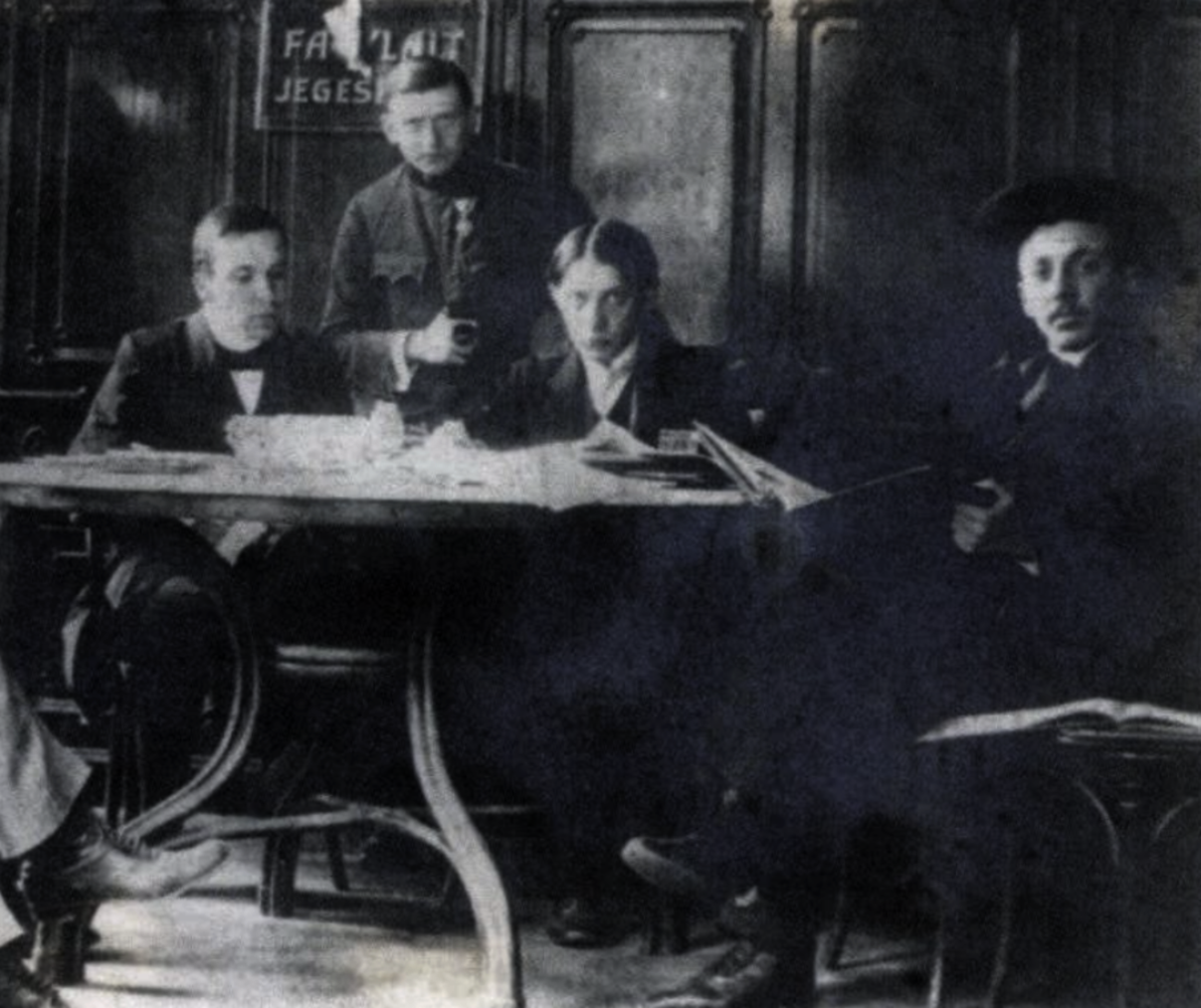
From the left: writers Gyula Juhász, Zoltán Franyó, Emőd Tamás, and Roth in Temesvár (Timișoara), ca. 1909

Roth soon created controversy with his public defense of the socialist agenda. In April 1907, he was found guilty of agitation against Hungary's constitutional statutes. He was sentenced to one year in prison and a fine of 300 crowns. On 1 November 1908, while attending a rally of the MSZDP's Southern Hungarian sections, Roth proposed increasing and radicalizing socialist propaganda—engaging in a dispute over this issue with his more moderate colleague, Otton Ossenkop. At a similar meeting in November 1909, he and Kunfi elaborated on the MSZDP's anti-clerical agenda, specifically targeting the "black army" of the Serbian Orthodox Patriarchate. They noted that state subsidies for the latter meant that the Orthodox clergy "supports itself with the starving and oppressed peasantry". Roth was elected to an eight-man organizing committee, which was tasked with overseeing the "political organization of the agricultural proletariat", reaching out to rural Swabians.

During the electoral campaign of 1910, Roth joined a "large number of socialists" who crashed a town hall meeting by the National Party of Work (NMP) for Lajos Návay. He heckled Mayor Carol Telbisz and gave his own impromptu speech, including a generic threat that the MSZDP "will not tolerate any kind of party meeting that does not support the position of universal suffrage." He himself presented himself as a MSZDP candidate in the neighboring Arad County, at Lippa, trying to unseat the NMP's Mihály Niameszny. Also then, Roth allegedly participated in the egging of Albert Apponyi, leader of the rival Party of Independence and '48. He was charged with this misdemeanor and faced trial that September, but the prosecutor dropped all charges in April 1911. Roth registered with the bar association in Temesvár (Timișoara) in June 1913.

The young lawyer served as municipal councilor in Temesvár, wherein he represented Erzsébetváros district. He was first elected to that position on 10 December 1913, along with another MSZDP man, József Terdély. Roth was then present at the May Day rally in 1914, where "a crowd of about 4,000 people" elected Sándor Nagy as leader of the MSZDP's Temesvár chapter. He addressed the crowd about the importance of elections and the socialist press, launching the slogan: "Fight them with ballot papers, not with stones!" At the height of World War I, Roth was a noted philanthropist, collecting funds to assist the families of lawyers who had been killed in combat. As highlighted by Jewish community historian Geta Neumann, the endeavor made Roth into a "very popular" figure. He also entered the city's Chamber of Labor, to 1930. On 7 October 1915, he intervened in favor of cobblers who had gone on strike at Turul Factory—obtaining their release from police custody, as well as a satisfaction of their demands. Over the following months, he also proceeded to investigate a shortage of milk which was affecting Temesvár's children, discovering that the city had signed a faulty contract with dairy farmer Endre Csekonics of Zsombolya.

During mid-1917, when Móric Esterházy took over as Prime Minister of Hungary and introduced reform bills, Roth initiated a city-council resolution saluting these "with patriotic joy." In July, he and Kálmán Jakobi established a local branch of the Hungarian National Association of Private Sector Employees (Magántisztviselők Országos Egyesületének), for which they registered 170 applications by women. In March 1918, Roth visited southern Romania, which was under military occupation by the Central Powers. He was there to collect the military records of his client "Vazul Branka" or "Vasile Branca" (pseudonym of Győző Bircse, originally from Turnu Severin), who was on trial in Austria-Hungary for having deserted to the enemy while on mission to destroy a Russian flotilla on the Danube. In July, Roth was able to prove that Branka was not guilty of treason, though Branka accepted a suspended sentence for draft evasion. In the 1930s, Maximilian Ronge of the Evidenzbureau, who had collected evidence for the prosecution, still maintained that Branka had in fact sabotaged the Danube expedition.

During June 1918, Roth was one of the MSZDP orators who riled up the crowds against Prime Minister Sándor Wekerle, who, they claimed, was sabotaging the effort to enact universal suffrage in Hungary. Shortly before the Aster Revolution of October, he was emerging as the MSZDP's regional leader, presiding upon a caucus that comprised mostly Hungarian and Swabian socialists. Anti-Austrian and anti-war riots began in Temesvár around 6 October, when crowds toppled monuments in honor of Ban Coronini and Anton Scudier; Roth and his colleague Leopold Somló joined the protests, speaking in favor of an immediate separate peace. Within this setting, they began popularizing the notion of autonomy for the reconstructed Banat. On 30 October, immediately after power in Budapest had been handed to the Hungarian National Council (MNT), Roth and Jakobi proceeded to discuss the Banat's future with the still-incumbent authorities. Mandated by the MSZDP, they met with Alispán György Kórossy, and later with Lieutenant colonel Albert Bartha, of the Common Army. They agreed to proclaim the Banat as an autonomous region of Hungarian Republic, in hopes that it would be spared invasion by the French Danube Army.

=== As Commissioner ===
Bartha later reported that he had been searching for his own solution to stalling the French invasion, and that, for this reason, he was the Republic's actual mastermind. That night, Roth also attended a meeting of the national military councils, which had been recognized by the outgoing Austrian military commander, Baron von Hordt; this congress took place inside the Military Casino. Taking the rostrum, Roth informed his public that Charles IV had abdicated as King of Hungary. He then announced the creation of a multi-ethnic legislature, called "People's Council", and ended his speech with a shout of "Long live the Republic". The event also brought a clear split between Roth's followers and ethnic Romanian delegates: taking over leadership of the latter group, Aurel Cosma proclaimed that their allegiance was to a Romanian National State. Roth would later note feeling astonished that Hungarian nationalists and Austrian loyalists were passive witnesses to both proclamations, when any could have used the opportunity to murder Roth and Cosma on the spot. Reportedly, although Cosma rejected Roth's ultimate designs, he assured him that they could still collaborate.

Later on 31 October, the MSZDP convened a rally of supporters in front of Timișoara City Hall. Roth spoke from the balcony, addressing thousands of supporters carrying socialist red flags; he proclaimed himself Commissioner for civilian affairs of the Banat Republic, with Bartha taking over as military Commissioner. Although this is sometimes read as a declaration of independence, Republican officials intended to create a federal Hungary, directly modeled on Swiss cantonalism. Regionally, the result would have meant "limited autonomy within the Magyar state" or a "Republic of Banat within the borders of Hungary." A telegram received by the MNT on 1 November evidenced "a fear that the Banat will secede from Hungary as a result of the proclamation." On 6 November, Népszava summarized the events, noting that the crowds "unanimously took a position in favor of the republican form of government", but at a national-Hungarian level. Népszava dismissed any claims that Roth and his supporters were separatists: "There is no such thing; those who know the mood of the population there can vouch as to the baselessness of this rumor."

The Banat buffer zone, superimposed over the three subsequent partitions of the Banat: Romanian in blue, Serb in red, and Hungarian in green

By 3 November, the cantonal arrangement was inoperable: the Hungarian armistice allowed the Allied Powers to take up positions in various parts of Hungary. This prompted Bartha to resign in protest, leaving Roth as sole leader of the Republic. Sometimes described as a "Socialist regime", the new polity reportedly introduced tax brackets, penalizing the highest earners. Roth's speech on 31 October also doubled as a call to non-violence: "The Revolution came, but it has now been fulfilled. We have shown the world, we have shown to our descendants, that the people of the Banat and Timișoara was able to obtain its republic and a brighter future without any bloodshed." Roth worked closely with an agitatorial poet, Franz Liebhard, whom he invited to lecture at the Timișoara Clerks' Association about the coming downfall of bourgeois regimes.

Despite such messaging, there followed a spread of mutinies and peasant revolts, prompting Republican officials to impose martial law. Looking back on the era in 1960, communist writer Péter Lőrinc described Roth as leader of the "reactionary Republic of the Banat", which, "just one of five days, shot in the head more than one hundred revolutionaries from the 'Red Corner' area of Becskerek!" The Republic was also repudiated by the Romanians and Serbs, who formed pluralities in, respectively, the eastern and western Banat. Independent Councils were created throughout these areas, rejecting Republican rule. While most activists took to Romanian nationalism or Yugoslavism, Serb peasants in Kusić and Zlatica formed a "Soviet republic" of their own. On 17 November, the Royal Serbian Army under Colonel Čolović entered Timișoara. This intervention had backing from all community representatives, including Roth. The Commissioner welcomed Čolović with a formal ceremony, under the slogan of "Long live internationalism". The Banat was not formally annexed to the Kingdom of Serbia, and the Republic continued to exist "on paper". Romanian priest Traian Birăescu, who accuses both Bartha and Čolović of war crimes, stresses the continuity between the two regimes: "It is interesting to note that the Serbs have maintained [Roth] in the function that had been created for him by the Timișoara soviet [sic], just as they have maintained that entire organization, under which Romanians had been cowardly murdered."

Historian Harold Temperley, who visited Timișoara on 7 December, reports that all ethnic communities in the city were temporarily satisfied with the arrangement, noting that "Serb troops have tactfully left the matter alone." However, Roth's National Guard of the Banat was immediately disarmed. Other reports show that various inter-communal tensions could not be contained. On 25 November, Roth issued a statement in which he urged the local press not to report on Serb atrocities, arguing that these accounts were "alarmist"; according to Birăescu, he had been forced to make these claims by direct pressures from Čolović. A day later, members of the Hungarian National Council in Becskerek prepared a list of Serb excesses to be read by Roth. They also put up "posters notifying the town's population not to obey the dispositions of the Serb National Council".

Roth's pacification did not last beyond December. By then, Serbia had joined the Kingdom of Serbs, Croats and Slovenes (or Yugoslavia), which looked to annexing as much of the Banat as possible (see 1918 annexation of Vojvodina). The situation became tense, as the Kingdom of Romania competed with Yugoslavia for seizing territory in the Banat, including Timișoara, put them on a collision course. The looming threat of war between two allies of France was blocked by a French peacekeeping intervention: on 3 December, 15,000 French troops marched into Timișoara, which became the center of a north-to-south buffer zone. Various Serb units remained in the city, and continued to work with Roth. On 17 December, the Commissioner was a guest at celebrations marking the birthday of Serbia's Prince Regent Alexander Karađorđević. In his speech, Roth noted: "This is a day of joy for us because we see that our Serb brothers are happy." An unsigned piece in Budapest newspaper expressed disapproval on behalf of Hungarians: "Boot-licking should have its limits. [...] The Serbs deserve to be treated with sympathy, since Hungarians and Serbs have never been enemies and only bad politics made us so. We also recognize that Serbs behave excellently in most places. But we protest against this type of spinelessness and humble flattery". A review of this episode, published in 1934 by Erdélyi Lapok, suggested that the celebration was "natural", since the Regent had lasting connections with the city—the place where his grandfather, Knez Alexander, had lived and died in the 1880s.

=== Downfall and Hungarian Soviet interval ===
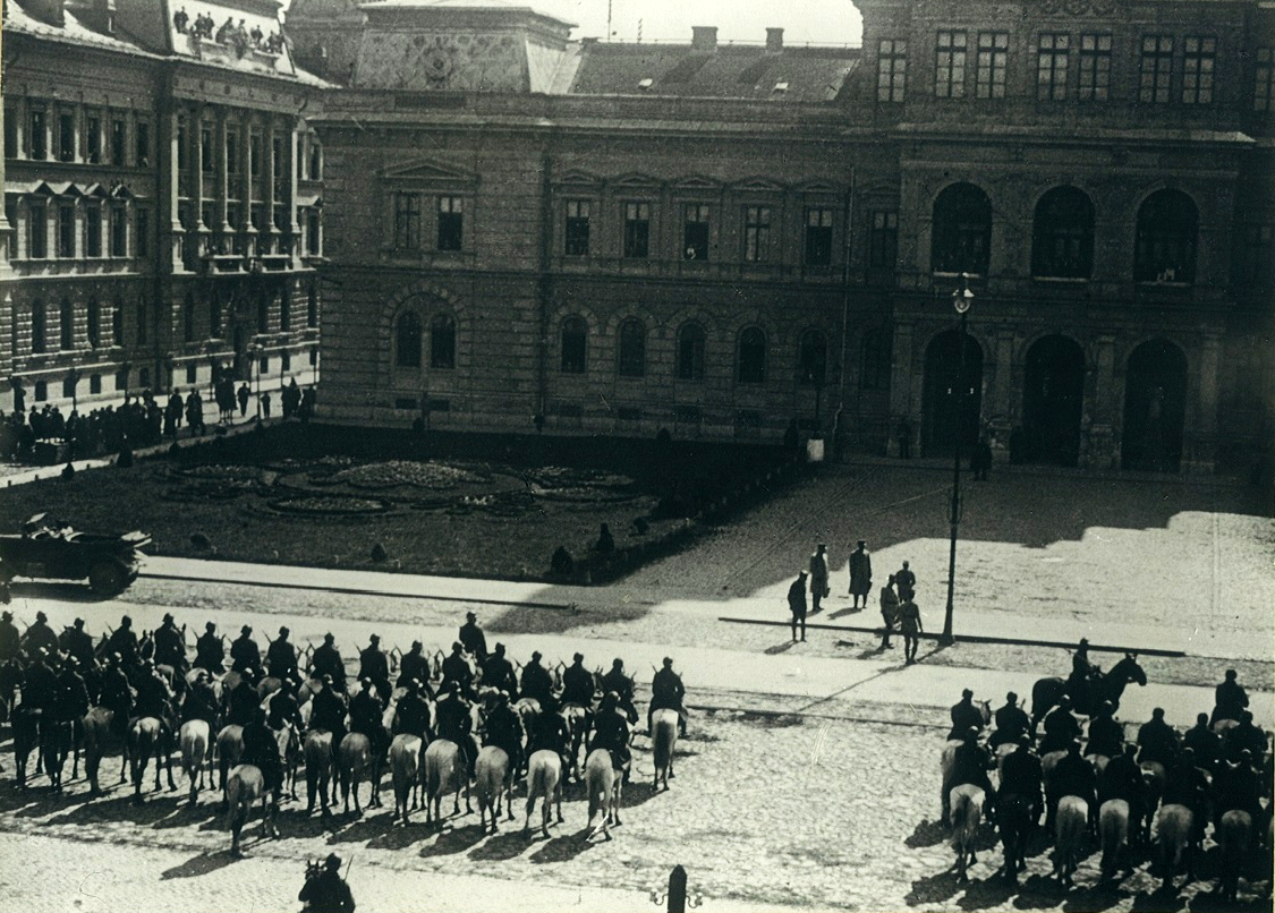
French cavalry in front of the City Hall of Arad, spring or summer 1919

On 28 December, French commander Henri Mathias Berthelot made a stop in Timișoara, and was met by Roth. The latter obtained from Berthelot a pledge that the city's industries would be supplied with coal from Petroșani. As the general acknowledged to Roth: "If there is no coal, and no industry, the unemployed will grow in numbers and this will encourage Bolshevism." Following the regime change, Roth reestablished the National Guard with backing from the Swabians' German National Council. The subsequent period witnessed a row between Roth and the Yugoslavs: the Yugoslavist newspaper Srpski Glasnik referred to him as a "chameleon" and a front for Hungarian nationalism. As noted in 1936 by Adolf Ungár in Brassói Lapok, Roth "was especially active in the direction of preventing the Banat from falling into Serbian hands." Political historian László Kővágó argues that, in January 1919, there began an "operation directed by Ottó Róth in Temesvár, whose aim was to establish the independent Republic of Banat". Kővágó notes that this conspiracy was assisted by Svetozar Mošorinski and Mladen Stanatiev, both of whom had been active in the MSZDP's Agitation Committee for Serbs and Bunjevci.

Serb authorities formally deposed Roth on 17 January 1919, stating in their communiqué that he was a divisive figure, due to his Social Democratic allegiance, and also that he "took a stand against the military authorities, which is incompatible with the need for meaningful cooperation." On 20 February, Republican guards were again disarmed and sent to their homes, allegedly by some of the Serb troops still present in the city, but possibly with French acquiescence. Historian Mária Ormos notes that 20 February was the actual date when Roth was removed from his post. The following day, the Yugoslavs recognized Martin Filipon as both Timișoara's Mayor and the regional Župan. Roth's ouster was met with protests and strikes by Timișoara's German and Hungarian workers. Threatened with arrest by the Royal Yugoslav Army, Roth escaped to Arad, finding refuge with the French garrison. Népszava of 25 February reported: "the leaders of government commissions were taken to Arad in four cars on Saturday night [23–24 February], surrounded by French guards, and with two French protection officers stationed next to them. Government commissioners Dr Otto Roth and Kálmán Jakob[i] are now living with their staff in the White Cross Hotel in Arad, but [...] they will return to Temesvár under French protection."

In March 1919, the Yugoslav authorities were investigating allegations that Roth and his finance minister István Mály had embezzled 24 million crowns from funds set aside for the defunct Banatian polity. With an ongoing Hungarian–Romanian War, the rump Hungarian state had been reestablished as a "Hungarian Soviet Republic", under Béla Kun. According to historian Sándor Kókai, Roth was one of the radicalized MSZDP members who pledged their allegiance to this communist regime. A 1920 report in Az Est newspaper informed readers that: "During the outbreak of the proletarian dictatorship, Dr Ottó Roth was still in Temesvár and stayed there for a while [because] he wanted to proclaim a proletarian dictatorship in Banat region during the foreign occupation"; at the time, Roth categorically denied that this was the case. This allegiance is acknowledged in a 1960 letter by Roth's son, Roland Robert, who refers to Otto as the "general prosecutor for [the Banat] during the Magyar revolution of 1919".

Roth was a party delegate for the 21 March 1919 socialist congress in Budapest, where he voted against an MSZDP absorption by the Hungarian Communist Party. Brînzeu argues that, if Roth took his distance from Kun, it was because Roth's own reading of Marxism shunned communization. Roth is quoted by Brînzeu as arguing that the whole of Eastern Europe still needed to fulfill a capitalist mode of production before going into communism, and therefore that its peoples would inevitably rise up against the Soviets. Similarly, a retrospective note in Amerikai Magyar Népszava describes Roth as belonging to the MSZDP's "most moderate wing", which took its commands from Ernő Garami. Marxist historian Tibor Hajdu believes that Roth actively "weakened the unity of the labor movement" by "serv[ing] Hungarian national aspirations" rather than proletarian internationalism.

During early 1919, Roth continued to seek out peaceful alternatives for the Banat. In his meetings with French representatives, he proposed an "independent Banat under French protection", and suggested its subsequent inclusion into the French colonial empire. Offering to negotiate the release of French captives in Hungary, Roth earned some support from the French general Léon Gaston Jean-Baptiste Farret. In late March, he was allowed to move out of Arad and to Lugoj; he and Farret then traveled to Belgrade, where Roth outlined his plan for Banatian independence. Hajdu and Ormos both see Roth as Kun's personal envoy, whose main mission was to bring about a détente between France and Soviet Hungary; Kun tried to obtain from the French that they rescind their more radical territorial demands, namely those outlined earlier in the Vix Note. The mission was partly successful, in that it settled a two-week truce between the two states. During his stay in Belgrade, Roth colluded with the French general Paul-Joseph de Lobit. He informed de Lobit that Hungarians would topple Kun on their own, if assisted by a 45,000-strong intervention force, and if allowed to hope that Hungary would be allowed to keep some of its traditional territories.

=== Arrests and political hiatus ===
All of Roth's plans for the Banat were vetoed by the French Ambassador to Yugoslavia, Louis Gabriel de Fontenay, who was especially derisive of Roth's claim that Banat Romanians also favored independence. Following Romanian complaints about his dealings with Roth, Farret was recalled to France. From May 1919, the Romanian Army began moving into the eastern Banat. The following weeks saw Romanian troops moving into Hungary-proper; Roth moved back into Hungarian-controlled territory, first in Szeged, and then in Budapest. The Soviet government was toppled by the Romanians that August, eventually giving way to a conservative republic. Roth was hiding with one of his relatives on Aradi Street 22, Terézváros, where he was arrested on 8 February 1920. He was in custody during the proclamation of a Hungarian Regency under Miklós Horthy. In early May 1920, the socialist magazine Előre alleged that Roth was a victim of the White Terror. With a royal prosecutor taking over the investigation in Budapest, Roth proved that he had not been involved in any acts relating to the previous Red Terror, and was released from prison by 15 May. By August 1920, the former Commissioner had returned to Timișoara—where he was again taken prisoner, this time by Romania.

During this interval, the Banat was effectively partitioned between Yugoslavia and Romania, with Timișoara going to the latter. Constantin Argetoianu, who served as Minister of Internal Affairs, publicly accused Roth of maintaining a seditious correspondence with Budapest, and announced that its publication would uncover a ring of Hungarian irredentists in the Banat. This group, Argetoianu claimed, had been instructed to canvass votes for the Socialist Party of Romania. As argued by Brînzeu, Roth's release came once he formally promised to Artur Văitoianu, the Prime Minister of Romania, that he would not engage in any form of politics; this version is also credited by Amerikai Magyar Népszava: "Dr Ottó Róth was briefly imprisoned by a Romanian military tribunal, but after promising to withdraw from politics, he was released by [...] a former Austro-Hungarian staff colonel, Gheorghe Domășneanu."

Argetoianu claimed to have personally decided for setting free the "communist ex-president of Timișoara Republic", whom he had previously called a "Hungarian government commissar". Upon his release, Roth remained Argetoianu's devoted friend for at least two decades. Roth finally returned to settle in Greater Romania, and "completely ceased his political activity". He was present for his high school reunion, held in 1921 in Orăștie: "nine of the seventeen former classmates came. In addition to the dead, those who left for Hungary were also missing." During the interwar, Roth's lawyer's practice, described by Ungár as "successful", was located at No. 29 on Regina Maria Boulevard, which was one of Timișoara's main streets. In early 1921, he was sharing offices with a Romanian lawyer, Emil Doboșan. Later that decade, he helped his friend Franyó recover money owed to him by Mihály Fekete, who had leased the Magyar Theater; this case required that the theater be debt-managed by a veterinarian, Árpád Szekeres.

Although formally withdrawn from active politics, Roth still traveled abroad to give public lectures on "democracy and socialism", and still wrote articles for the Banat press. He played host to Oszkár Jászi, the doyen of Hungarian liberalism in exile, when Jászi visited Timișoara (May 1923). In September 1927, he provided details on his time as Commissioner in an interview for the Temesvarer Zeitung. He was by then married to Rozalia (possibly born Singer), a well-known photographer from Timișoara. From 1926, she owned her own studio; called Pittoni or Pollyphoto, it was located at the Marschall Palace of Erzsébetváros (now designated as "Elisabetin"), then at Carlton Hotel in Cetate area. The couple had three children, all of whom they raised Catholic.

According to scholar Andreea Dăncilă Ineoan, "projects like the Banat Republic of Otto Roth" were still popular with segments of the Hungarian minority during the 1920s. In 1930, a government coalition of the National Peasants' Party and Romanian Social Democrats (PSDR) introduced decentralized bodies in public affairs. In July of that year, PSDR delegates on Timișoara's new municipal council asked Roth to represent them on the union of municipalities in Timiș-Torontal County, but he declined the offer. He did however accept to serve as a city delegate to the "Banat Directorate", alongside Baron Andor Ambrózy, Ioan Baltescu and Ioan Probst. Four years later, he was integrated into the legal department at Timișoara's Chamber of Labor.

=== Political return and World War II ===
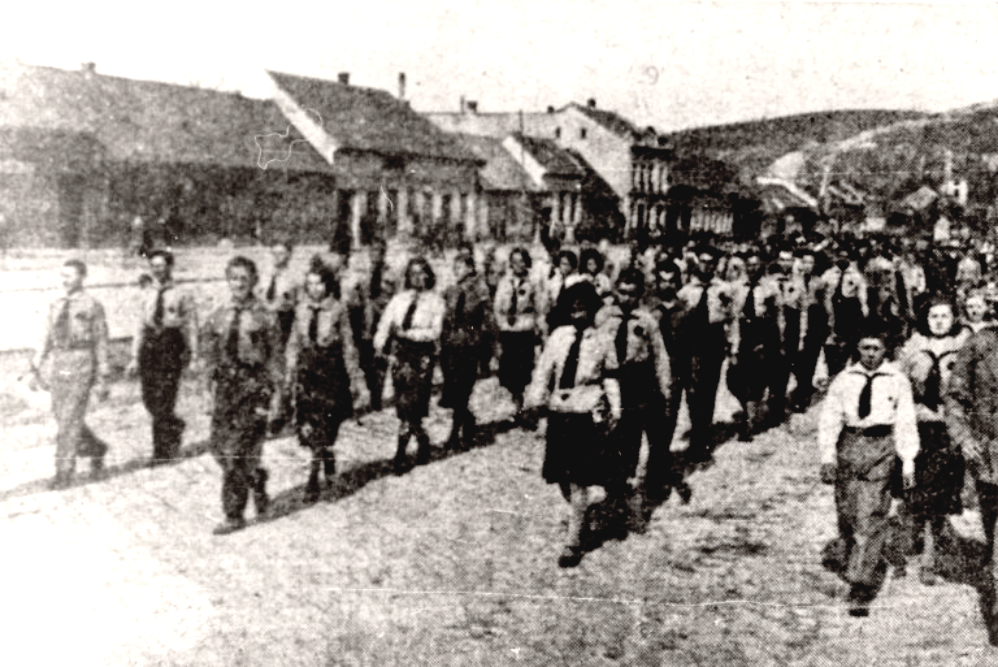
May Day parade of the Social Democratic youth in the Banatian town of Reșița, 1932

By late 1932, Roth had made a discreet return to his autonomist stance, complaining about the centralizing policies of Romanian governments. He attempted to revive this project with help from his Romanian schoolmates Brînzeu and Groza, and also claimed that Văitoianu was approving of this. His initial plan was to gather support for his social critique with a series of conferences at Dimitrie Gusti's Social Institute for the Banat. Brînzeu, who declared himself a right-wing autonomist, notes that Roth was probably an "anti-Bolshevik communist"—albeit one who was well informed about the goings-on in the Romanian Communist Party, including details about the whereabouts of Eugen Rozvan. Brînzeu also records Roth's support for Groza and Adrian Brudariu's far-left Ploughmen's Front, which included attending its 1933 congress in Deva. According to the same diarist, Roth was expecting the Soviet–Japanese border conflicts to explode into a full-scale war, and believed that Romania would prosper as the Red Army's provider of grain.

In the 1930s, Roth's activity as a Commissioner was critically revisited by Romanian nationalists, beginning with a "harsh attack" by Constantin Rabinovici in Unirea Română newspaper. As argued by Ungár, this piece was purposefully leading readers into mistaking the 1918 MNT and the Hungarian Soviet Republic, depicting Roth as a "red commissar". Timișoara's lawyers, including Pompiliu Cioban, further alleged that Roth had been paid for his services with a "truckload of paper" and "five million crowns". In December 1934, a General League of Artisans publicized allegations about irregularities at the Chamber of Labor, noting that these were assisted by "the kike Otto Roth, formerly a commissar of Bela Kun's, who has been tormenting Banatian Romanians around the time of the union, and who has fought by all means against the act of union." Roth resigned his position at the Chamber of Labor in March 1935, but, in 1936, sued both Rabinovici and Cioban for defamation. Already in 1938, Roth made plans to move with his family to French Madagascar, noting that this was a general movement of Jews faced with the rise of antisemitism (see Madagascar Plan). A frequent traveler abroad, he checked himself into a sanitarium in Pest, where he treated a nervous condition.

Brînzeu's diaries record that Roth became similarly preoccupied by the diplomatic conflict between Romania and Hungary. He reportedly had been told by Regency bureaucrats that Hungarian irredentism was merely facade. In June 1939, Roth told Brînzeu that "purebred Hungarians" actually favored a personal union between Hungary and Romania, as the only means of protecting their country from becoming a vassal of Nazi Germany. Roth revisited this stance in early 1940, when he was undergoing surgery in Budapest. He witnessed there the arrival of a large number of Hungarians from Romania, all of whom expected to return to their homes alongside an invading Honvédség. The prospect, he argued, was "crazy". In July 1940, Greater Romania began to crumble as the Soviet Union annexed Bessarabia. This led to a panic among the Romanian Jews, who feared that they would be subjected to retaliation; at the time, Roth resumed his political collaboration with Argetoianu, helping to establish contacts with the Communist Party. His son Roland Robert also recalled that during 1940 he had his first contacts with the Union of Communist Youth (UTC).

During parallel negotiations for the Second Vienna Award, which ended up assigning Northern Transylvania to Hungary, the former Commissioner declared himself shocked by Germany's growing influence. As noted by Brînzeu, Roth saw the possibility of the Banat being made into a German protectorate, but argued that its creation under Nazism would spell disaster for the local Jews. As he informed Brînzeu, this likely scenario had turned all Jews into supporters of the Romanian state, seen by them as the better alternative. On 4 July, Ion Gigurtu was appointed prime minister, with Romania firmly placed under a far-right Party of the Nation. Before this happened, Argetoianu made one attempt to establish a left-wing regime alongside the PSDR; Roth was called upon to assist in the negotiations.

Following Gigurtu's introduction of antisemitic policies, Roth had to close down his legal practice. The rise of the National Legionary State, followed by the Ion Antonescu dictatorship, expanded on the persecutions. In late 1940, the family was threatened with eviction from its home, the Siguranța having reportedly opened a file on Roth's "Bolshevik" activities; Brudariu successfully intervened for his friend. From April 1941, Germany invaded and partitioned Yugoslavia, creating the Yugoslav Banat into a Nazified territorial unit. In 1942, Roth began fearing that all Banat Jews would be deported into Transnistria Governorate, and that the Romanian Banat would be joined up with the occupied west, under Nazi rule. At this stage in his life, he expressed regret at not having exposed his children more closely to Judaism.

In October, as the Antonescu regime pondered allowing Banat Jews to be killed in the German-organized Holocaust, Groza intervened to obtain him a reprieve. His letter to Antonescu described Roth as apolitical and "unwavering in his pro-Romanian sympathies". During January 1944, Roth himself organized an intervention in favor of Groza, who had been arrested following his involvement with a resistance group, called "Union of Patriots". According to Brînzeu, the effort persuaded Antonescu to let Groza walk free; Roth himself referred to the Union of Patriots as a false-flag operation by Antonescu's men. By then, the Allied forces were in a position to systematically bomb Romania; Roth and his family were driven into improvised shelters.

=== In communized Romania ===
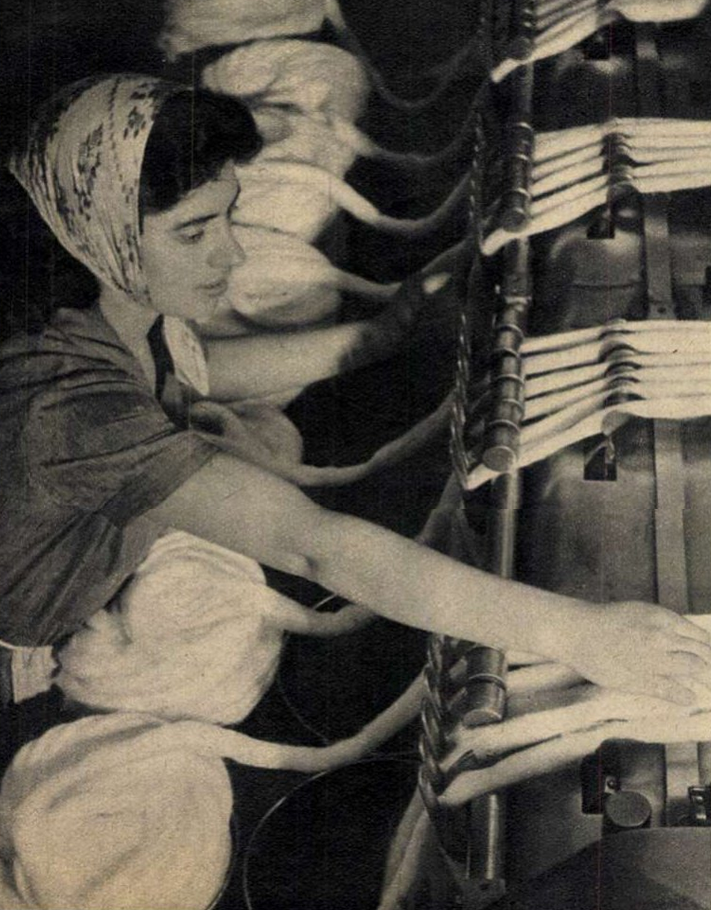
Interior of Romitex in 1961: distinguished worker Ana Măligă operating a cotton rolling machine

The Antonescu regime fell during the King Michael Coup of August 1944, which also brought Romania to the Allied side. In September, the Banat was the scene of skirmishes between the Wehrmacht and various pro-Allied forces. Reportedly, 1,500 Swabian civilians fell on Timișoara, preparing a pogrom of the Jewish population. The Roths and all other Jews in the city escaped to Lugoj. Following the seizure of power, Groza emerged as nominal leader of the Communist-dominated National Democratic Front (FND), and Roth returned as his confidant. However, in private he continued to express his qualms about Soviet policies. He also believed that the Hungary was headed for disaster, meaning that the Banat would still be assigned to Romania upon the war's end. He informed Brînzeu that Groza was ambivalent about his position in the FND, fearing that he was simply being used by Communist agitators, and would end up a Romanian "Kerensky". Around November, Roth made a return as a member of the Banat administration, openly affiliating with the PSDR chapter in Timiș-Torontal County. He was a delegate to the Collaboration Commission, which supplied the Red Army during its passage into Hungary.

In March 1945, following a clash between the FND and the right-wing government of Nicolae Rădescu, Groza took over as prime minister. Roth viewed this development as alarming. He believed that Romania would end up being absorbed by the Soviet Union. As Brînzeu notes, felt "disgusted" by this turn of events, and by Communist "trash making it to the surface"; Brînzeu records his own opinion that Roth had come across as a "decent idealistic soul", having "no ambitions for himself". During August 1945, the former Commissioner used his contacts in the Communist Party to ensure that Brînzeu would not be sent to a concentration camp. In 1946, he encouraged his friend to join Gheorghe Vlădescu-Răcoasa's team at the Ministry for Nationalities.

As recorded by Brînzeu, Roth had come to regard Groza as a "lunatic that should not be disturbed from his dreaming". However, he continued to argue that the Premier could balance British and American interests against the Soviets, and that he was the only pro-Western Romanian not to be tinged by fascist associations; he also recorded instances in which Groza was self-derisive and self-critical. During the process of nationalization, Groza's regime appointed Roth as a caretaker of Romitex (Timișoara's textile factory). He remained formally aligned with the pro-Soviet left, becoming vice president Romanian Society for Friendship with the Soviet Union in Timișoara (April 1946), where he also lectured in Hungarian (January 1947).

In May 1947, shortly after visiting Budapest with Groza and witnessing that city's Romanian Culture Week, Roth gave his impressions in a lecture at Timișoara's PSDR offices. Brînzeu's diary describes Roth as having by then turned against communism, privately expressing his belief that only three people of the Eastern Bloc actually believed in the communist ideology, namely: Stalin, Tito, and Dimitrov. In June, Roth attended a PSDR function which hosted Lotar Rădăceanu, who was organizing that party's leftist wing. Roth was reportedly confrontational, alleging that Rădăceanu was protective toward "Hungarian chauvinists", a category that, in his definition, included the nominally left-wing Hungarian People's Union (MADOSZ). Now calling himself a "Magyarized Jew", he complained that MADOSZ was constantly pressuring him into joining its ranks.

Postwar transition ended with the proclamation of a Romanian communist republic in 1948. During that year, Roth voiced criticism of the regime's decision to marginalize and persecute Brudariu. As reported by Roland Roth, Otto described Brudariu as an asset, someone who could unify the intellectual left around the communist program. Majtényi last saw Roth at his and Groza's 50th high school reunion, which took place in Bucharest rather than Orăștie. Roth was already a sick man, at a time when his family had been stripped of its income by the results of nationalization. As Brînzeu reports, Roth wrote to Groza to ask for advice, but received in a return a "rather indifferent" letter. Groza also rejected Roth's ideas about organizing multicultural events in Orăștie, and would not commit to overseeing a publication of Brînzeu's memoirs. By 1954, Roth and Brînzeu had been placed under surveillance by Securitate agents, who monitored their correspondence. Otto Roth died in Timișoara on 22 April 1956 (rendered in some sources as 20 April). His burial at the Jewish Cemetery was attended by Groza, who was a pallbearer.

== Legacy ==
Rozalia survived her husband by ten years. During that interval, Roland Roth worked as a pediatrician in Bucharest. He and Roth's other two children emigrated to Israel in the 1960s; they later resettled in Canada, where the last surviving one died in 2015. By 1965, Romania had turned to national communism, which frowned upon Roth's legacy: in 1972, some praise of the 1918 Republic was carried in a UTC paper, resulting in intervention by the official censors. In a 1971 issue of Igaz Szó, labor historian László Izsák made a note of Roth's "outstanding role" in Timișoara's socialist movement, on par with Lajos Bebrits. In 1979, Roth's contribution as a "Swabian autonomist" was covered at length by scholar William Marin. According to Geta Neumann, in post-communist Romania, "after decades of oblivion, [Roth's memory] is progressively revisited." Also according to Neumann, his friendship with Groza and Brînzeu, bridging differences between two ethnicities and three religious backgrounds, can be taken as a "shining example of Banatian cohabitation".
