= Aurel Cosma =

Romanian lawyer and politician

Dr. Aurel Cosma
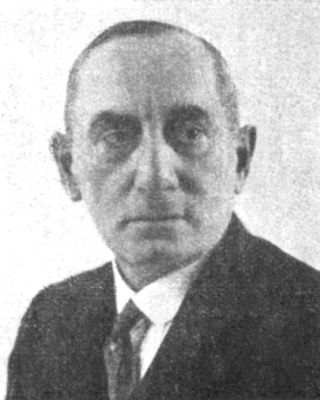

Prefect of Timiș-Torontal County
- In office 27 July 1919 – 4 April 1920
- Prime Minister: Ion I. C. Brătianu; Artur Văitoianu; Alexandru Vaida-Voevod; Alexandru Averescu
- Succeeded by: Corneliu Dragalina

Minister of Public Works
- In office 24 January 1922 – 30 October 1923
- Prime Minister: Ion I. C. Brătianu
- Preceded by: Gheorghe Lucasievici
- Succeeded by: Traian Moșoiu

Personal details
- Born: September 26, 1867 Berekszó, Austria-Hungary (now Beregsău Mare, Săcălaz commune, Romania)
- Died: July 31, 1931 (aged 63) Timișoara, Kingdom of Romania
- Party: Romanian National Party, National Liberal Party
- Education: Eötvös Loránd University
- Occupation: Lawyer, politician
- Known for: First prefect of Timiș-Torontal County, representative of the Banat in the Great National Assembly of Alba Iulia

Military service
- Allegiance: Austria-Hungary
- Branch/service: Austro-Hungarian Army
- Years of service: 1914–1918
- Rank: Captain

Aurel Cosma (September 26, 1867 – July 31, 1931) was a Romanian lawyer and politician. A leader of the National Party in Timișoara before World War I, Cosma was a representative of the Banat in the Great National Assembly of Alba Iulia that voted for the Union of Transylvania with Romania on 1 December 1918.

== Early life ==
Aurel Cosma was born in the village Beregsău Mare in the family of the school teacher Damaschin (1844–1915) and Maria Panaiot. He went to the primary school in Topolovățu Mare. Later (in 1877) Cosma moved to a state school in the Fabric district of Timișoara where he was taught in Hungarian language, which was required in order for him to be able to attend a secondary school ("Gymnasium"). He graduated in 1888 from the Piarist Gymnasium in Timișoara. Afterwards he received an "Emanoil Gojdu" scholarship of 150 florins, enabling him to study Law at Debrecen. In 1890 Cosma was drafted in the army, graduating from the Artillery School in Sibiu after a year. In October 1891 he resumed his law studies at the Eötvös Loránd University in Budapest, earning on 28 April 1894 his PhD degree in Law with the thesis "Death Penalty".

== Professional activity ==
At his parents' insistence, Aurel Cosma returned to Timișoara and started his internship in the office of Pavel Rotariu and Emanuil Ungurianu. On 16 April 1894 he passed his bar examination, being admitted to the Lawyers' Chamber of Timișoara on 7 May 1894. On 7 February 1921 the Lawyer's Chamber decided to become a bar association, electing Aurel Cosma as its chairman. He practiced law for 35 years, also as the lawyer of the "Timişiana" Bank.

== Political activity ==
=== Romanian national movement ===
During his studies Aurel Cosma became a supporter of the Romanian national movement. He compiled a memoir for the rights of the Romanians in Transylvania and the Banat, contesting the immigrationist theories regarding the origins of the Romanians, and he had a major role in spreading the Eugen Brote's political manifesto Cestiunea română din Transilvania şi Ungaria ("The Romanian Question of Transylvania and Hungary"), which was published in the wake of the Transylvanian Memorandum.

In 1902 he was elected chairman of the Romanian National Party in Timișoara.

=== World War I, the Banat Republic and Union of the Banat with Romania ===
During World War I he was conscripted and fought on the Eastern Front at Kraków, however as he reached 50 years of age (in 1917) he was appointed the commander of the Timișoara POW camp.

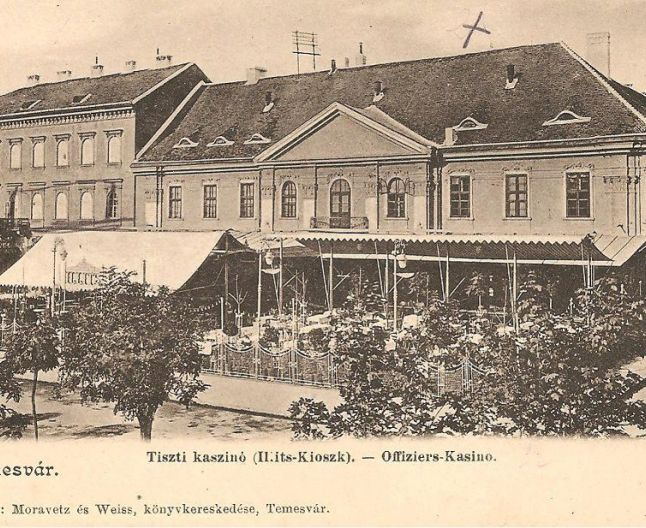
Photo of the Military Casino before the end of World War I

On 31 October 1918, at a meeting of all Austrian-Hungarian officers in the Military Casino, in protest at the proclamation of the Banat Republic by Dr. Otto Roth (who was soon to be elected the Commissioner-in-Chief of the Republic), Cosma established the Romanian National Military Council, composed of commissioned officers only, declaring "We, the Romanians, cannot accept Mr. Otto Roth's proposal. The aspirations of our people urge us to follow a different path". Almost nine years later, Otto Roth recalled on 25 September 1927 in an interview for the Temesvarer Zeitung: "Dr. Aurel Cosma obviously laid [before us] the highest ideal of any Romanian politician: Greater Romania. And he did this at a time and at a place in a very risky way. I gambled with my own life proclaiming the [Banat] Republic at that officers' meeting, on 31 October 1918, and only in hindsight I realized that then, out of 700 present officers, none drew his sword either for the Habsburgs or Count Tisza. Even so they could also have cut Cosma into pieces because he was the only one who jumped to the tribune of the Military Casino hall and thundered: 'Romanians, follow me, long live the Romanian National Council!'". The officers removed the Austro-Hungarian insignia off their uniforms, replacing them with cockades in the Romanian national colors, and proceeded to create the Romanian National Guards. Subsequently, he was elected in the High National Romanian Council (Romanian: Marele Sfat Național Român).

On 12 November 1918 the Royal Serbian Army entered the Banat and a force led by Colonel Čolović took control of Timișoara on 17 November. Serbian garrisons disarmed the remaining Guards of Timișoara and Reșița. A delegation of the Banat Romanians, led by Aurel Cosma, participated at the Great National Assembly of Alba Iulia that declared the union of Transylvania and the Banat with the Kingdom of Romania, despite the opposition of the Serbian administration, which tried to block the departure of the Romanian delegates.

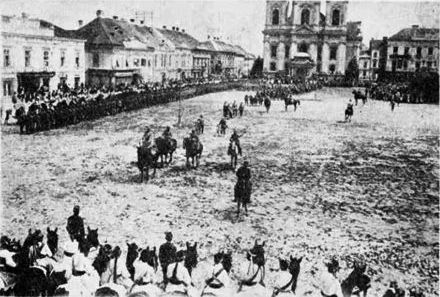
Romanian troops in Timișoara's Domplatz (now Union Square), 3 August 1919

On 28 July 1919, after the withdrawal of the Serbian administration from Timișoara, Aurel Cosma, appointed Prefect by the Directory Council of Transylvania (Romanian: Consiliul Dirigent al Transilvaniei), took over the administration of the Romanian Banat from the Timișoara mayor Josef Geml with the support of the French General Charles de Tournadre. Aurel Cosma signed a proclamation by which he appealed to the ethnic Romanians to "respect without any reserve the rights of the other nationalities, in order to have their rights respected by those in return, and to live together in harmony, like brothers, with all the minorities of the Banatian lands". The Romanian authorities also requested that Josef Geml remain as mayor of the city. Aurel Cosma mentioned that, despite ethnic and sectarian differences, people live well together when united by culture, and he, in his role as prefect, would emphasize this idea and strive to keep this local tradition alive: "we have to dignify each other, we have to respect each other, without taking the ethnicity into account".

=== Later years ===
Although the second Averescu cabinet confirmed him as prefect on 13 March 1920, Aurel Cosma resigned on 4 April 1920, and afterwards created and led the local branch of the National Liberal Party (PNL). Between 24 January 1922 and 30 October 1923 he held the office of Minister of Public Works in the sixth Ion I. C. Brătianu cabinet. In 1927 Cosma was elected deputy on a PNL ticket in the Timiș-Torontal County, and in 1931 he was elected senator.

== Private life ==
On 23 September 1894 he married Lucia, the daughter of Partenie Cosma, former President of the Romanian National Party (1882–1883), former deputy in the Hungarian House of Representatives and director of the Banca Albina, the first bank with private Romanian capital in Transylvania.

== Honors ==
- Order of the Star of Romania, Commander
- Order of the Crown (Romania), Grand Cross
- Order of Ferdinand I, Commander
- Order of St. Sava
- Order of Polonia Restituta
- Order of the Phoenix
- Order of the Holy Sepulchre
- Ordinul "Meritul Industrial şi Comercial", 1st Class
- Honorary citizen of Timișoara
- Bust on the Alley of Timișoara's Personalities
- A street in Timișoara bears his name
