= Military Casino of Timișoara =

Military Casino
- Cazinoul Militar
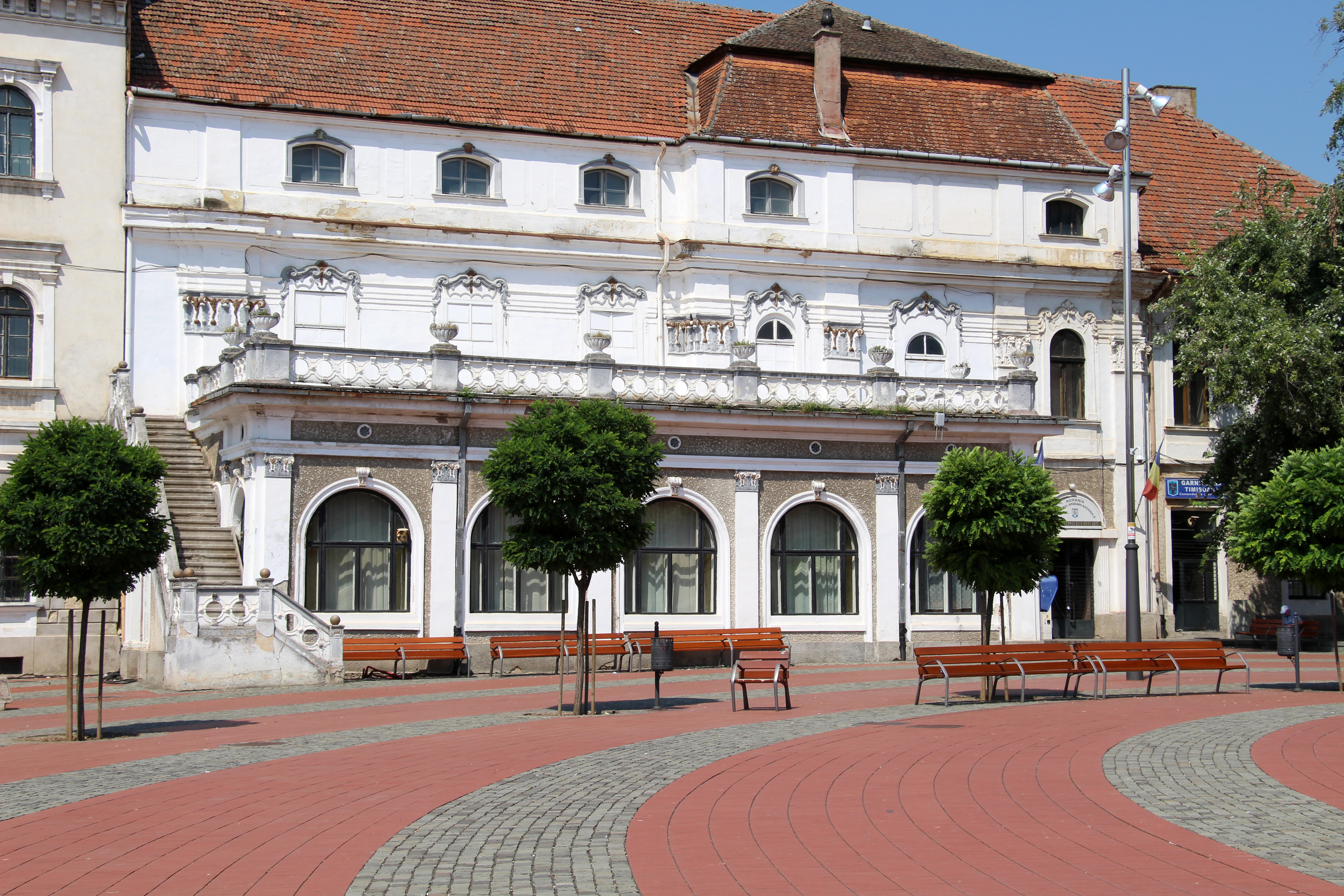
- Interactive map of the Military Casino area
- Former names: Commander's House

General information
- Architectural style: Rococo
- Location: Liberty Square, Timișoara
- Coordinates: 45°45′20.9″N 21°13′35.2″E
- Construction started: 1744
- Completed: 1775
- Renovated: 1910
- Owner: Ministry of National Defence

The Military Casino (Romanian: Cazinoul Militar), one of the oldest buildings of Timișoara, is situated on the west side of the city's Liberty Square. Its construction began in 1744 and was completed in 1775. The building eventually became a casino, although it did not start as one. At present it is listed as a historical monument with the LMI code TM-II-m-A-06143.

The Military Casino is actually the pavilion A of the building complex formally known as Casern 901 (Romanian: Cazarma 901).

== History ==
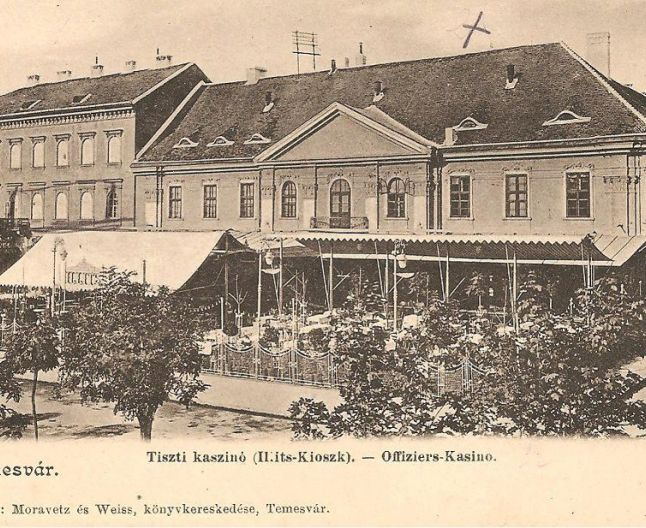
The Military Casino before the end of World War I

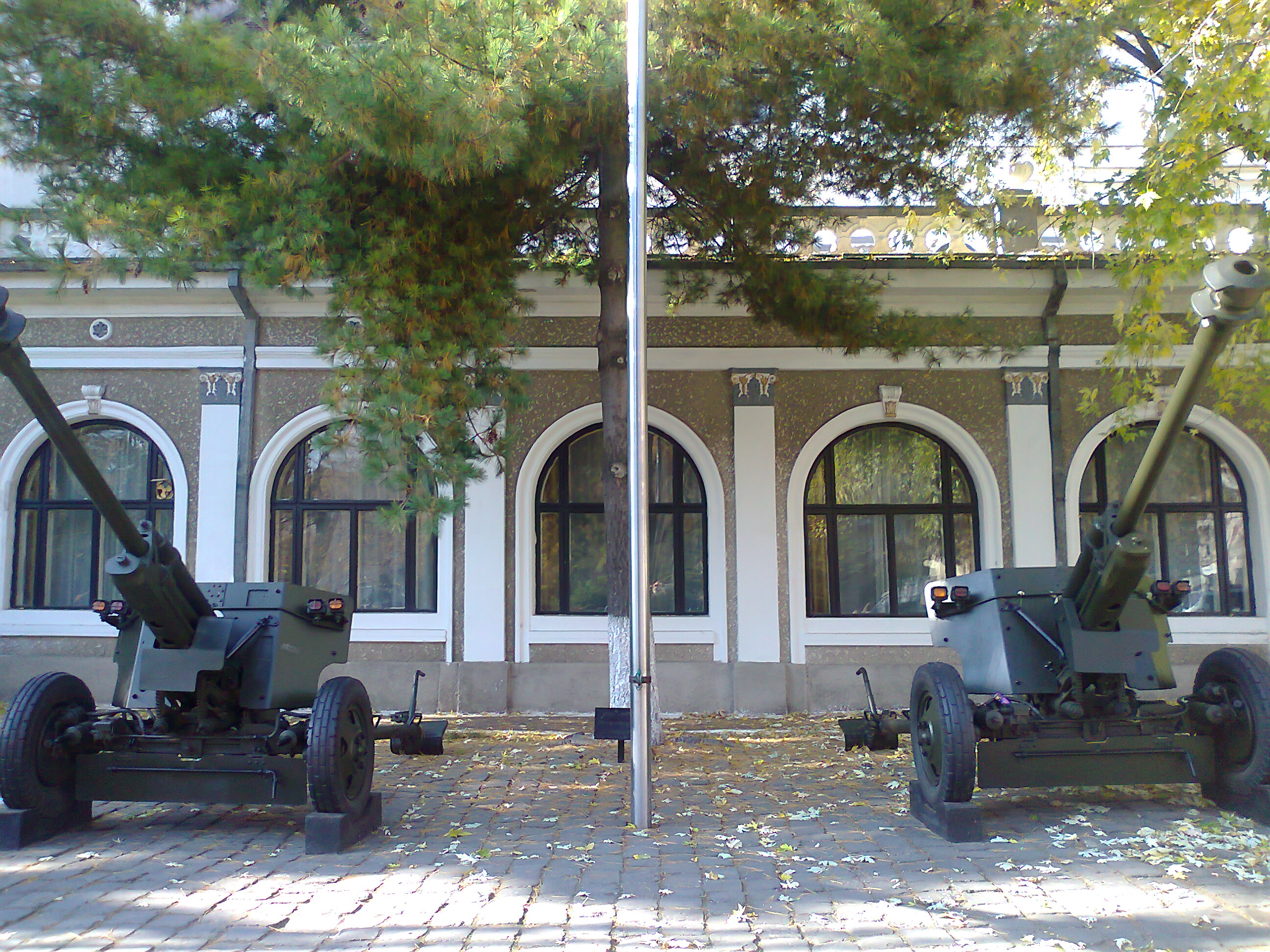
Anti-tank cannons in front of the Military Casino before their removal in 2015

After the Austrians, led by Prince Eugene of Savoy, captured the Timișoara Fortress in 1716, the Turkish fortress was completely destroyed. Almost immediately the rebuilding of the fortress began according to Austrian standards. The surface to be surrounded by walls was enlarged, while the inner, ruined Turkish buildings were demolished. A plan of the fortress with perpendicular streets was drawn up. It had two squares that became Union Square and Liberty Square. Several buildings were built in Parade Square (present-day Liberty Square): the Town Hall (today known as the "Old Town Hall") and some buildings with military designation.

In 1744 the construction of a house for military commander Count Soro was begun in the northwestern corner. In 1746–1747 the Mosque of the Silahdar was in the southern part of the house, on the site of the current façade of the casino. The mosque was later pulled down. In 1754 the house was expanded to the south on the surface of the former mosque. Although the building was completed in 1758, the last refurbishments were finished in 1775. Initially the building had one floor. In 1910 others storeys were added. A hall with stained-glass windows and a terrace above were built to replace the summer terrace. The large ballroom upstairs played an important role in the social life of the young people, as the famous officers' balls were held here.

Otto Roth proclaimed the Banat Republic in this building on 31 October 1918, but Aurel Cosma requested the Romanian officers to leave the casino. They went to the Kronprinz Hotel (in the current building of the Opera House) where they established the National Romanian Military Council.

In the period when Iuliu Illithy administrated the casino it was named Grand Établissement Illithy. From 1921 it was named Prince Carol Military-Civil Casino. After World War II it was known as the Military Casino. Since 1996 it houses the Military Museum and Circle.

In 2002 two 75 mm Reșița Model 1943 anti-tank cannons were placed in front of the terrace, but they were removed after the square was redesigned in 2015.

== Architecture ==
The style of the building is Late Baroque. The double edged pilasters are in the Corinthian order with decorative elements on the façade. A Rococo element is the rounded corner in the northeast of the building.
