= Az Est =

Hungarian evening newspaper (1910–1939)

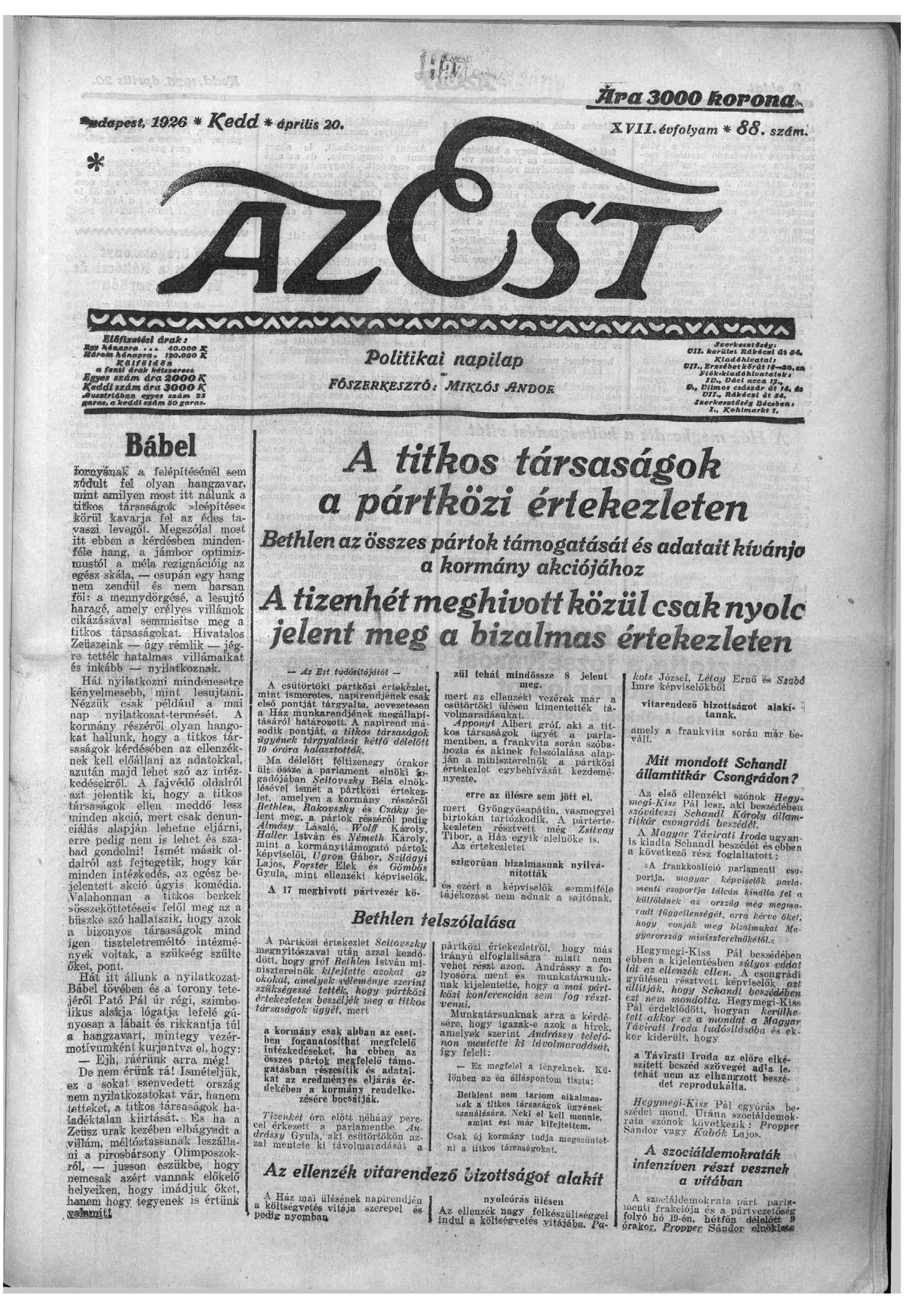
- Type: Evening newspaper
- Founder: Andor Miklós
- Publisher: Az Est Lapkiadó Rt
- Editor-in-chief: Andor Miklos
- Founded: 16 April 1910
- Ceased publication: 1939
- Language: Hungarian
- Headquarters: Budapest
- Sister newspapers: Pesti Napló; Magyarország

Az Est (Hungarian pronunciation: [ˈɒz ˈɛʃt], Hungarian: The Night) was an evening daily newspaper which existed between 1910 and 1939 in Budapest, Hungary. It was one of the earliest boulevard newspapers in the country and enjoyed higher levels of circulation during its lifetime.

== History and profile ==
Az Est was launched by Andor Miklós in 1910. Its first issue appeared on 16 April that year. Miklós was also owner and editor-in-chief of the paper of which subtitle was politikai napilap (Hungarian: political diary). However, it had no clear political stance and was not close to a political party. The paper was headquartered in Budapest and published daily by the Az Est Lapkiadó Rt (Hungarian: Est publishing house) which also published three other newspapers, Pesti Napló and Magyarország. The advertisement posters of these papers were created by Hungarian graphic artist Tibor Pólya.

Az Est featured comprehensive articles on foreign news. For instance, Croatian journalist Marija Jurić Zagorka was among its foreign contributors who published articles on the political news in Yugoslavia. Towards the end of World War I the paper was one of the publications which criticized the alliance between German Empire and Austria-Hungary. In addition to Népszava and Világ it supported the establishment of the revolutionary government after the dissolution of Austria-Hungary. It adopted a much more moderate political stance following the end of the revolutionary government.

Az Est had a circulation of 150,000 copies. Its circulation became very high over time, and it even managed to sold almost half a million copies. The paper folded in 1939 shortly after its nationalization due to the fact that it was owned by a Jew, Imre Salusinszky.
