= Albert Bartha =

Hungarian military officer and politician

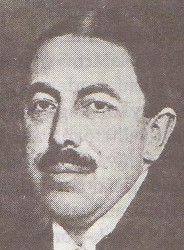
- Born: 12 August 1877; Kolozsvár, Kingdom of Hungary, Austria-Hungary
- Died: 2 December 1960 (aged 83); New York, United States
- Military career
- Allegiance: Austria-Hungary First Hungarian Republic (Hungarian Republic (1946–49)) Second Hungarian Republic
- Service years: 1906–1949
- Rank: Major General
- Conflicts: World War I

Albert Bartha de Nagyborosnyó (12 August 1877 – 2 December 1960) was a Hungarian military officer and politician who served twice as Minister of Defence of Hungary.

Bartha was born in Kolozsvár (now Cluj) and attended the Ludovika Academy in Pest before becoming an instructor at the Theresian Military Academy. He served as a staff officer in the Austro-Hungarian Army on the eastern front of the First World War, becoming Chief of Staff of the Second Army in 1917.

He was appointed Minister of Defence of Hungary from November 9 to December 12, 1918, under the First Hungarian Republic; he also served as the Minister of Defence of the short-lived Banat Republic in 1918. He was forced out by protests against his anti-communist policies, and lived in Turkey from 1922 to 1925. Bartha did not serve under the Horthy government, and took part in anti-Horthy resistance before the German occupation. He returned to Hungary in 1945, joining the Independent Smallholder's Party and serving as Minister of Defense from August 21, 1946, to March 14, 1947.

Forced to flee Hungary in 1948 by the ascendant communists, Bartha first lived in Austria and Belgium before immigrating to the United States in 1951. He died nine years later at the Orleans Hotel in New York City.

== Works ==
- Az aradi 13 vértanú pörének és kivégzésének hiteles története (1930);
- A lég- és gázvédelem kézikönyve (1938).
- Kétszer szemben a kommunizmussal

Political offices
Preceded by Béla Linder	Minister of War; 1918	Succeeded by Sándor Festetics
Preceded by Ferenc Nagy	Minister of Defence; 1946–1947	Succeeded by Lajos Dinnyés
