= Severin County =

Județul Severin
- County (Județ)
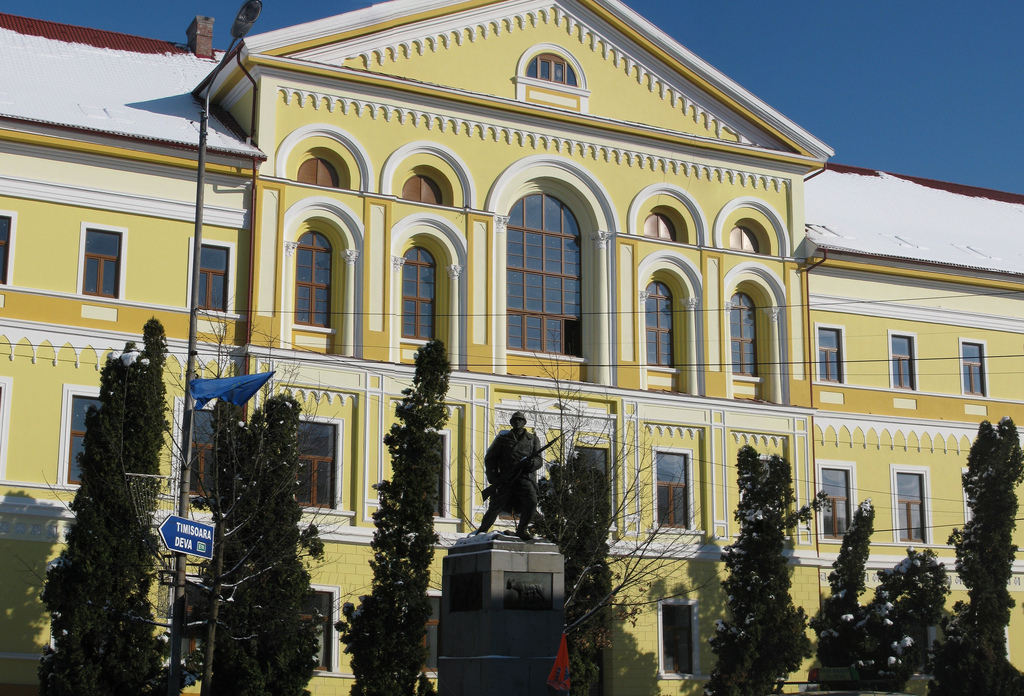
- The Prefecture building of Severin County building of the interwar period.

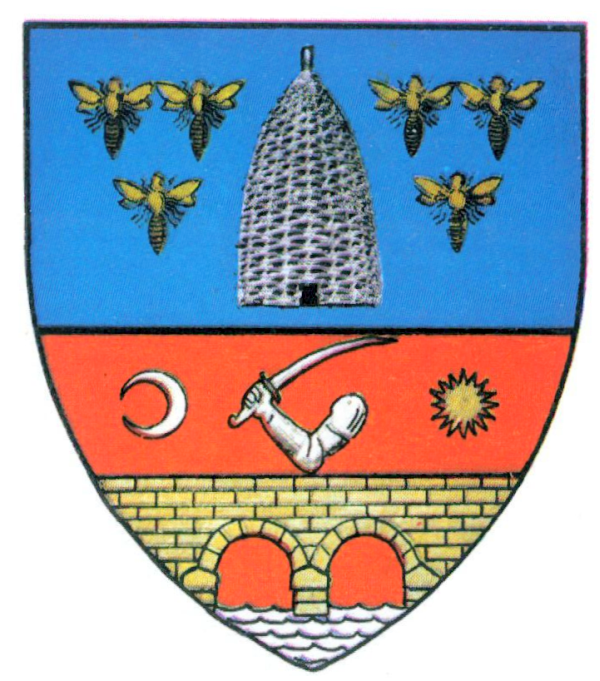
- Coat of arms

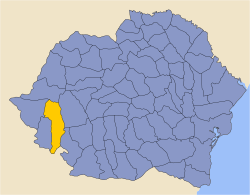
- Country: Romania
- Historic region: Banat
- Capital city (Reședință de județ): Lugoj
- Established: 1926
- Ceased to exist: Administrative and Constitutional Reform in 1950

Area
  - Total: 6,422 km^{2} (2,480 sq mi)

Population (1930)
  - Total: 239,586
  - Density: 37.31/km^{2} (96.62/sq mi)
- Time zone: UTC+2 (EET)
  - Summer (DST): UTC+3 (EEST)

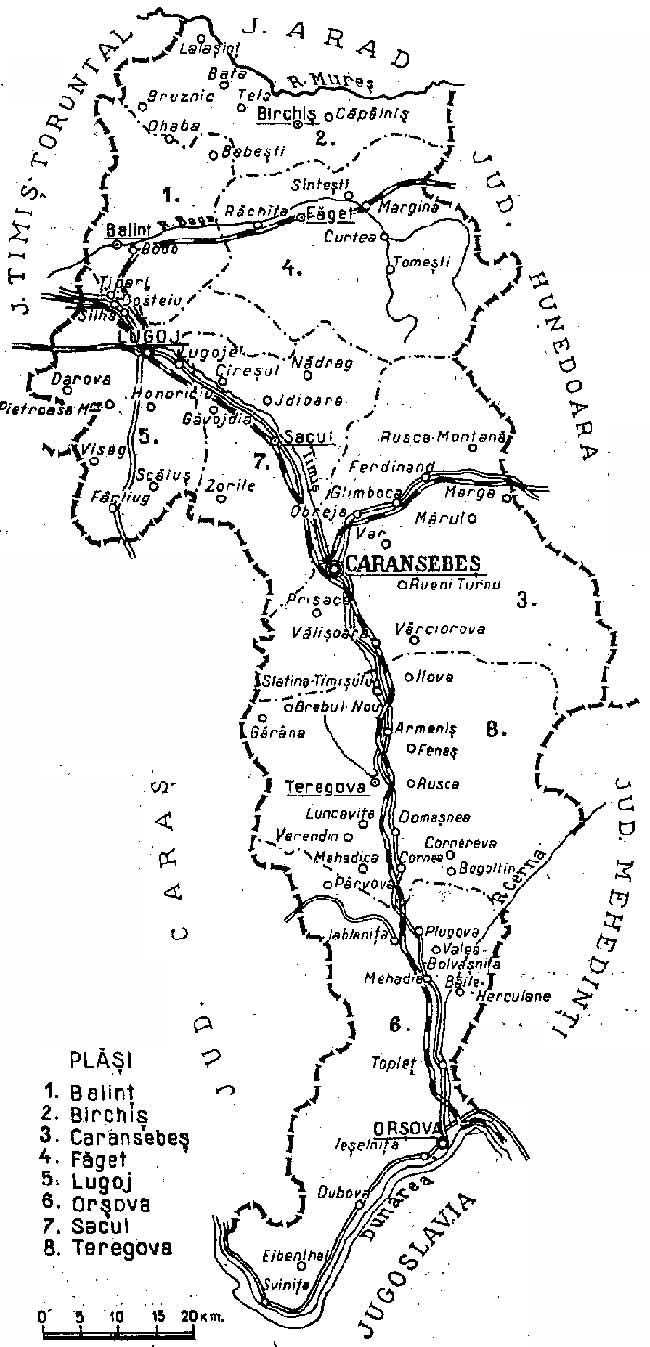
Map of Severin county as constituted in 1938

Severin County was a county (Romanian: județ) in the Kingdom of Romania, in the historical region of the Banat. Its capital was Lugoj. Severin County was established in 1926, disbanded with the administrative reform of 1938, re-created in 1940, and finally disbanded with the administrative reform of 1950.

== Geography ==
Severin County covered 6,422 km^{2} (2,480 sq mi) and was located in the south-western part of Greater Romania, in the eastern part of the Banat. Currently, the territory that comprised Severin County is divided between Timiș, Caraș-Severin, Arad, and Mehedinți counties. In the interwar period, the county neighbored Caraș and Timiș-Torontal counties to the west, Arad County to the north, Hunedoara County to the east, Mehedinți County to the southeast, and the Kingdom of Yugoslavia to the south.

== Administrative organization ==
Administratively, Severin County was originally divided into six districts (plăși):

1. Plasa Birchiș, headquartered at Birchiș
2. Plasa Caransebeș, headquartered at Caransebeș
3. Plasa Făget, headquartered at Făget
4. Plasa Lugoj, headquartered at Lugoj
5. Plasa Orșova, headquartered at Orșova
6. Plasa Teregova, headquartered at Teregova

Subsequently, two more districts were established.

7. Plasa Balinț, headquartered at Balinț
8. Plasa Sacul, headquartered at Sacu

The county had three urban communes (cities): Lugoj (the county's headquarters), Caransebeș, and Orșova.

== Population ==
According to the census data of 1930, the county's population was 239,586, which were ethnically divided as follows: 76.6% Romanians, 9.6% Germans, 6.6% Hungarians, 2.2% Romanies, as well as other minorities. From the religious point of view, the majority of the county population consisted of Eastern Orthodox (75.4%), followed by Roman Catholics (14.9%), Greek Catholics (3.9%), Reformed (3.1%), as well as other minorities.

=== Urban environment ===
In 1930, the county's urban population was 40,456 inhabitants, ethnically 47.3% Romanians, 24.5% Germans, 16.8% Hungarians, 4.6% Jews, 3.1% Romanies, 1.2% Czechs and Slovaks, as well as other minorities. From the religious point of view, the urban population consisted of 46.4% Eastern Orthodox, 36.4% Roman Catholic, 4.9% Reformed, 4.8% Jewish, 4.1% Greek Catholic, 2.3% Lutheran, as well as other minorities.
