= Timiș-Torontal County =

Județul Timiș-Torontal
- County (Județ)
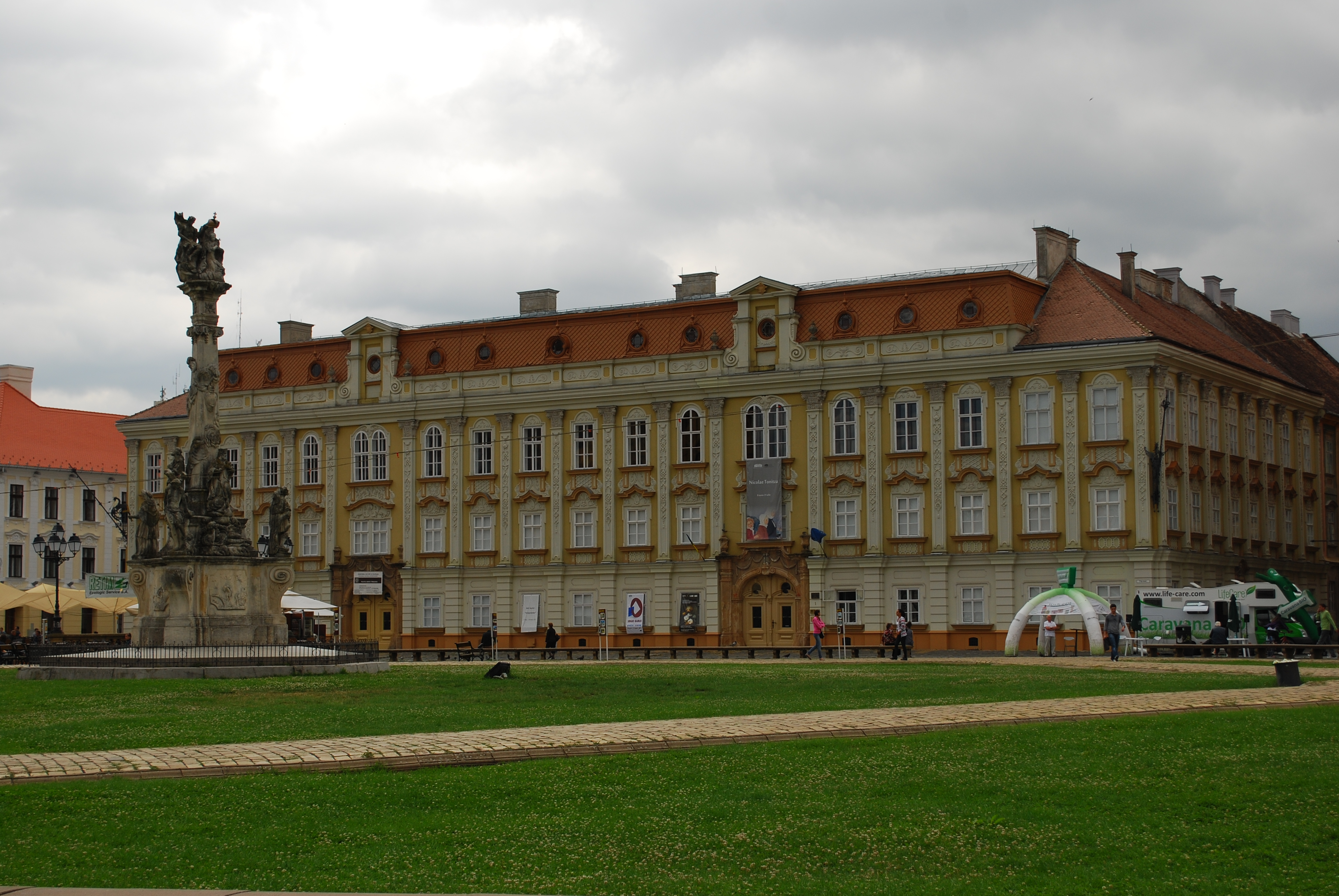
- The Timiș-Torontal Prefecture building from the interwar period, now the Timișoara Art Museum.

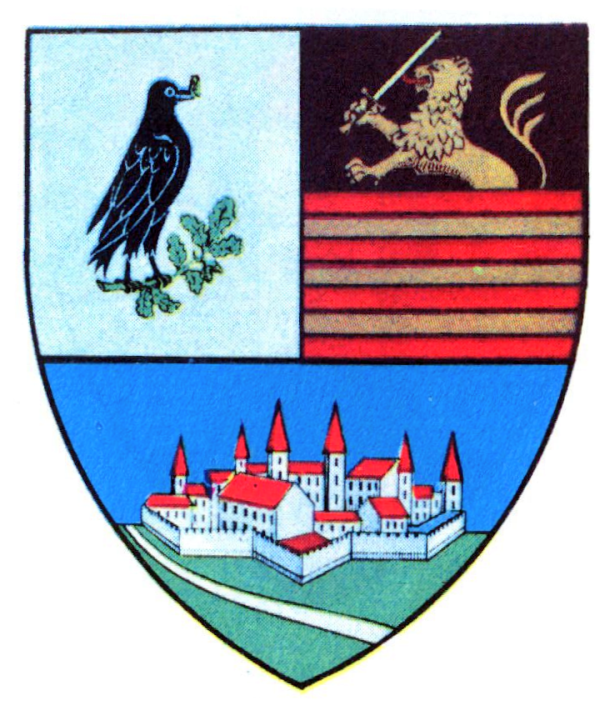
- Coat of arms

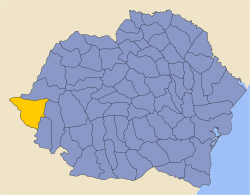
- Country: Romania
- Historic region: Banat
- Capital city (Reședință de județ): Timișoara
- Established: 1925
- Ceased to exist: Administrative reform of 1950

Area
  - Total: 7,600 km^{2} (2,900 sq mi)

Population (1930)
  - Total: 499,443
  - Density: 66/km^{2} (170/sq mi)
- Time zone: UTC+2 (EET)
  - Summer (DST): UTC+3 (EEST)

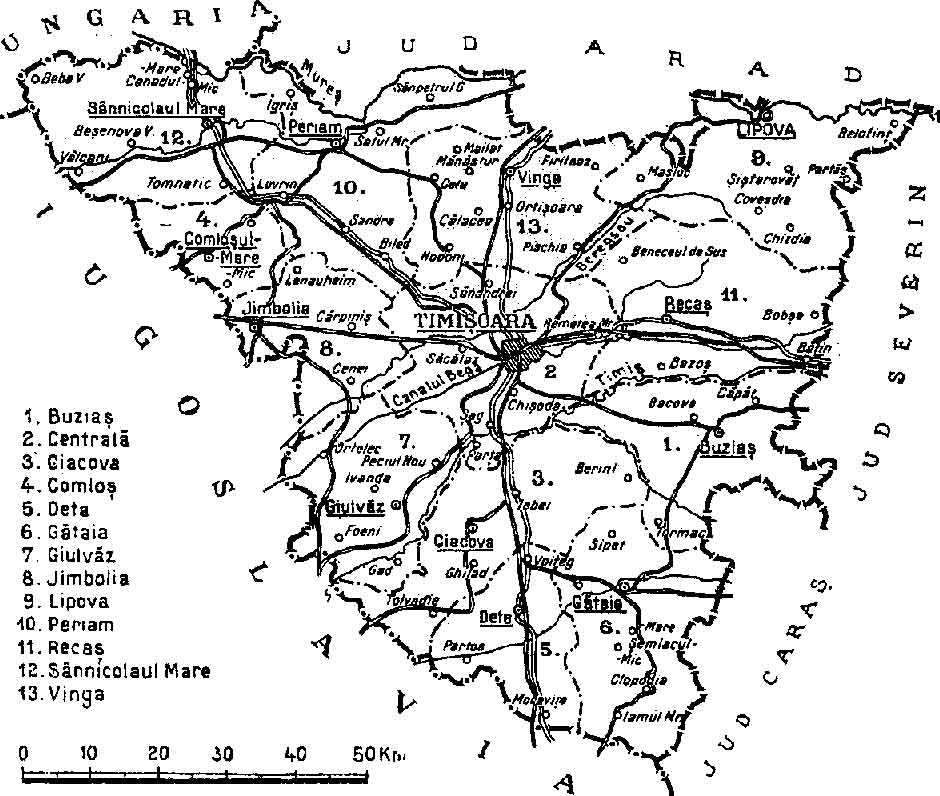
Map of Timiș-Torontal County, as constituted in 1938.

Timiș-Torontal was a county (Romanian: județ) in the Kingdom of Romania. Its capital was Timișoara. The territory of the county had been transferred to Romania in 1920 from the Kingdom of Hungary under the Treaty of Trianon.

== Geography ==
Timiș-Torontal County covered 7,600 km^{2} and was located in western part of Greater Romania, in the Banat. Currently, the territory that comprised Timiș-Torontal County is now mostly part of Timiș County except for the eastern part, the areas around Lugoj and Făget, which are in Arad County.

== History ==
On 27 July 1919, the first prefect of Timiș, appointed by the Royal Romanian authorities, Aurel Cosma, was installed. The Timiş-Torontal County included the parts of the former counties Temes and Torontál which were awarded to the Kingdom of Romania as part of the Banat. The new county was composed, in the first phase, until 1925, the districts (plăși): Buziaş, Centrală (Central), Ciacova, Comloş, Deta, Gătaia, Giulvăz, Jimbolia, Lipova, Periam, Sânnicolaul Mare, and Vinga.

On 24 November 1923, there was a border correction between Romania and the Kingdom of Serbs, Croats and Slovenes (the forerunner of Yugoslavia). The villages Jimbolia (Croatian: Žombolj, Hungarian: Zsombolya), Beba Veche (Stara Beba, Óbéba), Cherestur (Krstur, Pusztakeresztúr), Ciortea (Csorda) and Iam (Jám) were ceded to Romania, and Meda (Međa, Párdány), Modoș (Modoš, Módos), Șurian (Šurjan, Surján), Căptălan (Busenje, Káptalanfalva), Crivobara (Markovićevo, Torontálújfalu) and Gaiu Mare (Veliki Gaj, Nagygáj) were handed over to the Kingdom of Serbs, Croats and Slovenes.

In 1925 the Law of Administrative Unification was promulgated. The Timiş-Torontal District was divided into two urban communes (Timișoara and Lipova) and 246 rural communes grouped in twelve districts. Subsequently, on 12 December 1926, a thirteenth district was established (Comloş or Comloşul Mare). The county neighbored Caraș County to the southeast, Severin County to the east, Arad County to the north, Kingdom of Yugoslavia to the west and southwest and Hungary to the northwest.

In 1929 Timis-Torontal County was integrated into the 7th Ministerial Directorate, led by Sever Bocu. In 1938, Timiş-Torontal, Arad County, Caraș County, Severin County and Hunedoara County were merged into the newly founded Ținutul Timiș. The counties were re-established in the 1940 administrative reform, only for Timiş-Torontal County to be disbanded with the administrative reform of 6 September 1950.

== Administrative organization ==
Administratively, Timiș-Torontal County was originally divided into ten districts (plăși):

1. Plasa Buziaş, with headquarters at Buziaş (with 25 communes)
2. Plasa Centrală, with headquarters at Timișoara (with 23 communes)
3. Plasa Ciacova, with headquarters at Ciacova (with 17 communes)
4. Plasa Deta, with headquarters at Deta (with 16 communes)
5. Plasa Jimbolia, with headquarters at Jimbolia (with 10 communes)
6. Plasa Lipova, with headquarters at Lipova (with 27 communes)
7. Plasa Periam, with headquarters at Periam (with 17 communes)
8. Plasca Recaş, with headquarters at Recaş (with 29 communes)
9. Plasa Sânnicolaul Mare, with headquarters at Sânnicolau Mare (with 13 communes)
10. Plasa Vinga, with headquarters at Vinga (with 18 communes)

Subsequently, three more districts were established:

11. Plastica Comloş, with headquarters at Comloşu Mare (with 9 communes)
12. Plasa Gătaia, with headquarters at Gătaia (with 17 communes)
13. Plasa Giulvăz, with headquarters at Giulvăz (with 16 communes)

== Population ==
According to the 1930 census data, the county's population was 499,443, ethnically divided as follows: 37.6% Romanians, 34.9% Germans, 15.4% Hungarians, 5.8% Serbs and Croats, as well as other minorities. From the religious point of view the inhabitants were Roman Catholic (48.6%), Eastern Orthodox (41.1%), Greek Catholic (2.8%), Reformed (2.5%), as well as other minorities.

=== Urban population ===
In the year 1930, the urban population of the county (the cities of Timișoara and Lipova) was 97,580 inhabitants, ethnically divided as follows: 30.5% Germans, 29.3% Hungarians, 27.7% Romanians, 7.6% Jews, 2.2% Serbs and Croats, as well as other minorities. From the religious point of view, the urban population consisted of 52.1% Roman Catholic, 27.7% Eastern Orthodox, 9.9% Jewish, 5.0% Reformed, 2.8% Greek Catholic, 2.4% Lutheran, as well as other minorities.
