= Bácskai Napló =

Bácskai Napló (lit. Bačka Journal) was a Hungarian language daily political newspaper. The first issue of Bácskai Napló was published on 16 June 1907, with the purpose of serving as the information source for the Magyars and Hungarian language-speaking population in Bács-Bodrog County within the Kingdom of Hungary in Austria-Hungary. It was published in Subotica, today in Serbia. Bácskai Napló was the organ of National Association of Christian Socialists of Bács-Bodrog County. Bácskai Napló survived the World War I and was also published in the Kingdom of Serbs, Croats and Slovenes. From 1917 to 1919, it was published under the name Délvidék. This newspaper was banned in the beginning of 1920, but reappeared in the summer of the same year. Its editors-in-chief were Gyula Veréb, Lajos Kónya, János Völgyi, Gyula Tóth and Kálmán Balás-Piri. Bácsmegyei Napló ceased publication in 1923.

== See also ==
- Hungarians in Vojvodina

== External references ==
- (Hungarian) Kosztolányi Dezső emlékoldal - Bácskai lapok.1 Sajtótörténeti háttér a Forrásjegyzék 2. kötetéhez
- (Hungarian) Születésnapi Újság, születésnapi újságok, régi újság minta ajándék ...
- (Hungarian) Szabadka városfejlődése 1700 és 1910 között
- (Hungarian) LÉTÜNK - TÁRSADALOM, TUDOMÁNY, KULTÚRA, 2002.1-2
