= Jaša Tomić =

Serbian journalist, politician and author

- Јаша Томић
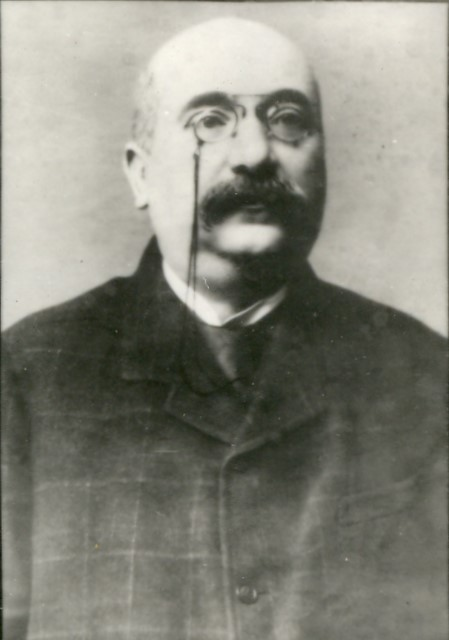
- Jaša Tomić, c. 1920
- Born: Jakov Tomić; 23 October 1856; Vršac, Voivodeship of Serbia and Banat of Temeschwar, Austrian Empire
- Died: 22 October 1922 (aged 65); Novi Sad, Kingdom of Serbs, Croats and Slovenes
- Occupations: Politician, publicist, journalist and man of letters

Jakov Tomić (Serbian Cyrillic: Јаков Томић; 23 October 1856 – 22 October 1922) was a Serbian journalist, politician and author from the Serbian region of Vojvodina, which was part of the Austrian Empire when he was born.

Modoš, a town in the Serbian part of Banat, was renamed in his honor in 1924.

== Biography ==
At the time of his birth in 1856, the town of Vršac was part of the Voivodeship of Serbia and Banat of Temeschwar crown land in the post-1849 Habsburg monarchy. His Serbian Orthodox Christian family had thrived significantly from trade in the region. He attended elementary school in Vršac, then gymnasium in Timișoara and Kecskemét. He was a volunteer in the Herzegovina Uprising, after which he attended medical faculties in Vienna and Prague, but later transferred to the faculty of philosophy and philology. Thereafter, Tomić was involved in Serb politics in Habsburg-controlled parts of present-day Serbia (Serbian Vojvodina). Combining interests in socialism and Serbian national politics as did many of his generation, namely Svetozar Marković, Mihailo Polit-Desančić, and Nikola Pašić, he eventually found himself much less of a socialist than an ardent Serbian patriot.

Tomić was the editor of Srpsko kolo and Zastava magazines and founder of the People's Freethinker Party (Narodna slobodoumna stranka), which in 1891 became the Radical Party (Radikalna stranka). In 1889, following a series of articles regarding nature of his employment at Zastava, in which he implicated his wife Milica Miletić, Tomić stabbed to death a liberal political rival, Miša Dimitrijević, the editor of Branik magazine, in Novi Sad. Dimitrijević alleged that Milica, who was the daughter of famed lawyer and Novi Sad mayor, Svetozar Miletić, who in turn was the founder of Zastava, arranged the position of editor for Tomić as a part of a dowry and mentioned in a daily journal that he was in a possession of a letter that demonstrated this intention and sent the letter in question to Jaša in written correspondence. He served seven years in prison for murder, emerging in 1896 with no loss of political zeal. Not only political but economic issues had far-reaching importance to him. Tomić, then the most vociferous opponent of the hierarchy, the leader of the Serbian radical party and son-in-law of Svetozar Miletić, blamed the clergy for driving people away from churches because of its insistence on controlling church and autonomous finances: "Whoever has to worry about how to spend so much money has no more time to care for the church and people."

In 1918, Tomić became president of the Serb National Council in Novi Sad, where at the Great People's Assembly of Banat, Bačka and Baranja from November 25, he proclaimed the secession of these regions from the Kingdom of Hungary and their unification with the Kingdom of Serbia. In 1919 Jaša Tomić, still, the leader of the Radicals in Vojvodina Province, whose failing health prevented him from taking a more active role was perfectly straightforward in stating to Croat politicians (including Vjekoslav Spinčić) that "we are not one" in nationality. He was also occupied with literary work at the time. Tomić died in Novi Sad in 1922, and was buried at the Uspensko groblje cemetery.

== Works ==
- In 1876 under the pseudonym "Volunteer" Milutin Spasić, Tomić wrote a brochure: Srpsko-turski rat 1876 (Serbo-Turkish War of 1876).
- Pesme (Poems), published by A. Pajević in 1879, edited by Kosta Lera.
- In 1884 Tomić issued a political pamphlet, Stranke srpskih notabiliteta protiv srpske narodne slobodoumne stranke.
- Političko vjeruju, reprinted from Zastava, organ of the Radical Party (NRS), 1886.
- Književna zrnca, Vol I, 1888.
- Treba li narodu politika (Do People Need Politics), 1888.
- Posle petstotina godina: razmatranja o Kosovskoj bitci i propasti carstva srpskog (After Five Hundred Years: A Look at the Battle of Kosovo and the Fall of the Serbian Kingdom), 1889.
- Iz prošlosti naših vođa (Our Leaders From the Past), 1889.
- Govor u svoju odbranu prlilikom naknadne rasprave zbog tucindanskog dogadjaja u novom Sadu, 1891.
- Nazareni (Nazarenes, a novel), printed in Novi Sad, 1896.
- Pesme Jaše Tomića (Poems by Jaša Tomić), 1896
- O uzrocima zločina, Novi Sad, 1896.
- Pametno nazarenstvo, Book 1, 1897.
- Pametno nazarenstvo, Book 2, 1897.
- Slike i pripovetke (Pictures and Stories), 1897.
- Vođa kroz izbore (Through the Elections), Novi Sad, 1897.
- Čiča Stanko (Old Man Stanko), Novi Sad, 1897.
- Zemljoradnička sirotinja u Ugarskoj (The Poor Farming Folk of the Kingdom of Hungary), 1897.
- Ima li pomoći našim zanatlijama (Is There Aid For Our Tradesmen), 1898.
- Trulez (novel), 1898.
- Program radikalne i program liberalne stranke (The Program of the Radical Party and Liberal Party), 1901.
- U čemu je stvar (What It's All About), 1901.
- Gorak šećer, 1902.
- Majski sabor (May Assembly), 1902.
- Kakvo se zlo sprema u Srbiji, 1903.
- Hoćemo li u socijaliste (Do We Want Socialists), 1904.
- Na prelomu, 1905.
- Jedan nadsolgabirov, 1904.
- Parnica protiv srpskih manastira, 1905.
- Izbor i pravo manjine (Elections and the Rights of the Minority), 1905.
- Sta je bilo i sta treba da bude (What It Was and What Should Be), 1905.
- Jesmo li na dobrom putu (Are We On the Right Path), 1906.
- Vodja kroz saborske izbore, 1906.
- Nisam više magarac (I'm No Longer An Ass), 1906.
- Tražim svoja prava (I Want My Rights), 1907.
- Samostalci iz Hrvatske i Slavonije i samostalci iz Srbije. 1907.
- Sabor junak od megdana, 1907.
- Reč našoj braći u Srbiji, 1907.
- Kako smo birali patrijarhe kroz 200 godina (How We Elected Patriarchs Through the 200 Years), 1908.
- Nova manastirska uredba, 1908.
- Laze i paralaze (Lies and More Lies), 1908.
- Boj na Kosovu, Seoba Srba (The Battle of Kosovo, The Great Serbian Migration), Montenegro, 1908.
- Kako se zovemo (How We Are Called), 1909.
- Veleizdajnička parnica u Zagrebu, 1908.
- Žena i njeno pravo (Woman and Her Rights), 1909.
- U čemu je naša avtonomna borba, 1910.
- Hoćemo li na djavolsku stranu (Do We Want the Devil's Side), 1910.
- Na pragu novog doba u Ugarskoj, 1910.
- Nesavremena i savremena istorija, 1910.
- Gde je srpska politika i Samouprava-napred, 1911.
- Dositej Obradović, 1911.
- Rat na Kosovu i Staroj Srbiji (Battle of Kosovo and Old Serbia), 1913.
- Rat u Albaniji pod Skadrom, 1913.
- Rat u Maćedoniji i Bugarskoj, 1914.
- Karlovačka Mitropolija i Hrišćanstvo (The Metropolitanate of Karlovci and Christianity), 1913.
- Seoba u Srbiju, 1914.
- Naša nova država u kolevci, 1919.
- Krajnje vreme da se razumemo, 1919.
- Šta je bila žena i šta će biti, 1918.
- Lepa književnost i umetnost, 1918.
- Gradja za nov radikalni program, 1919.
- Kako da delimo zemlju, 1919.
- S kim ćemo i kuda ćemo, (With Whom Are We Going and Where Are We Going), 1919.
- Razvod braka, pozorišna igra u 5 činova, 1919.

== Gallery ==
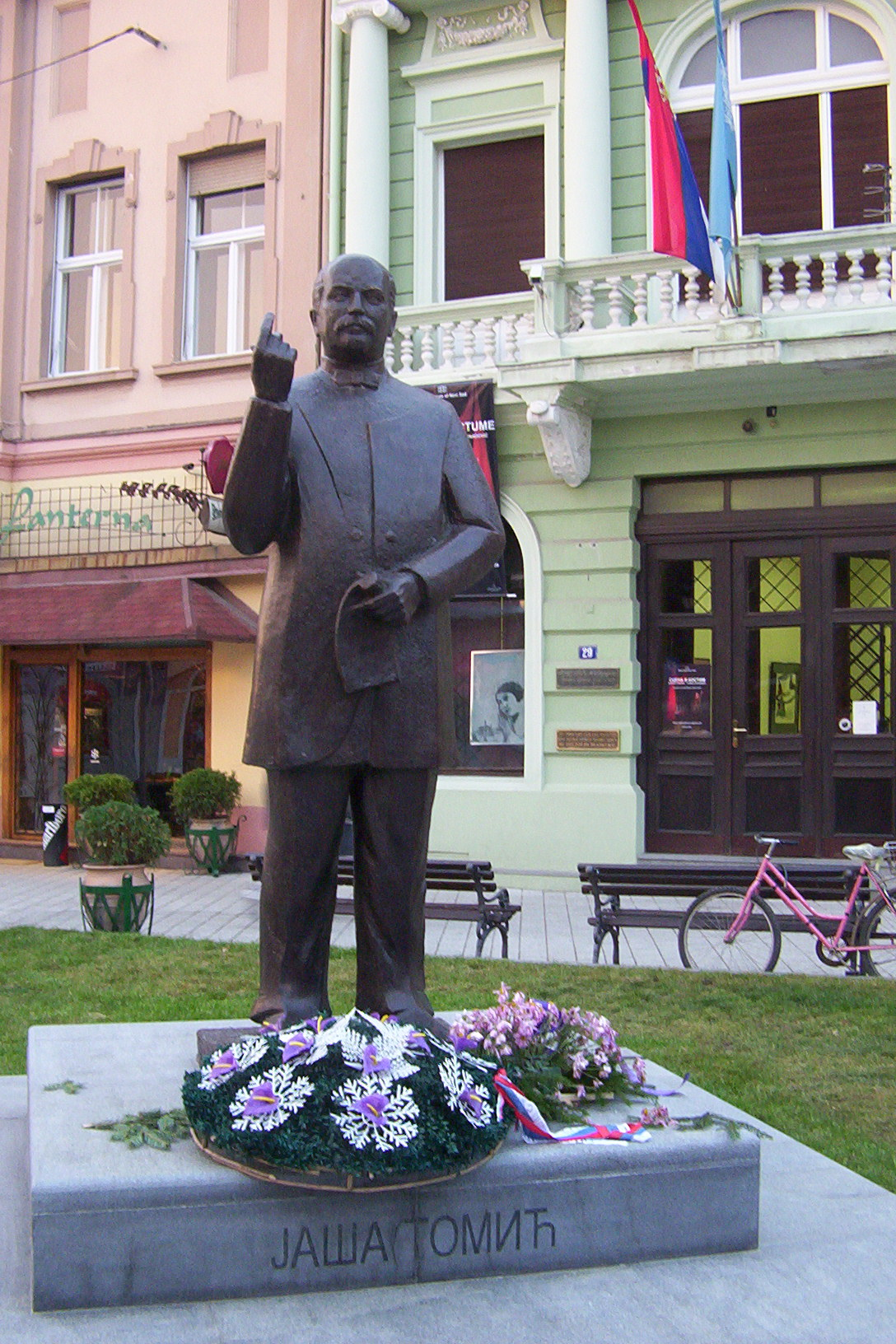
Statue of Jaša Tomić in Dunavska street, Novi Sad

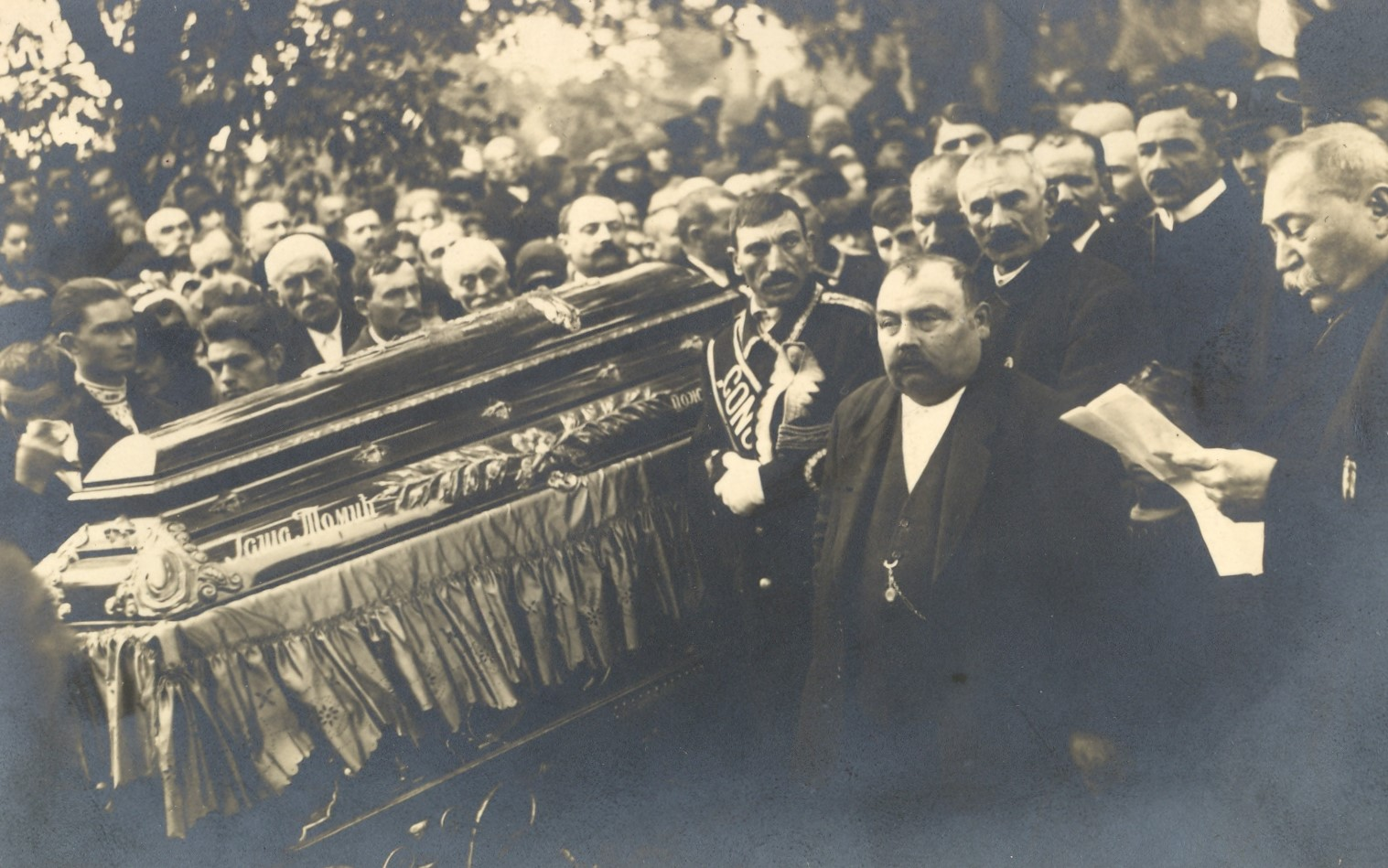
Jaša Tomić's funeral

Poems by Jaša Tomić

== Sources ==
- Ivo Banac, The National Question in Yugoslavia: Origins, History, Politics, Cornell University Press, 1988, pp. 160
- Jovan Mirosavljević, Brevijar ulica Novog Sada 1745-2001, Novi Sad, 2002
