= Great National Assembly in Novi Sad =

Political assembly on 25 November 1918

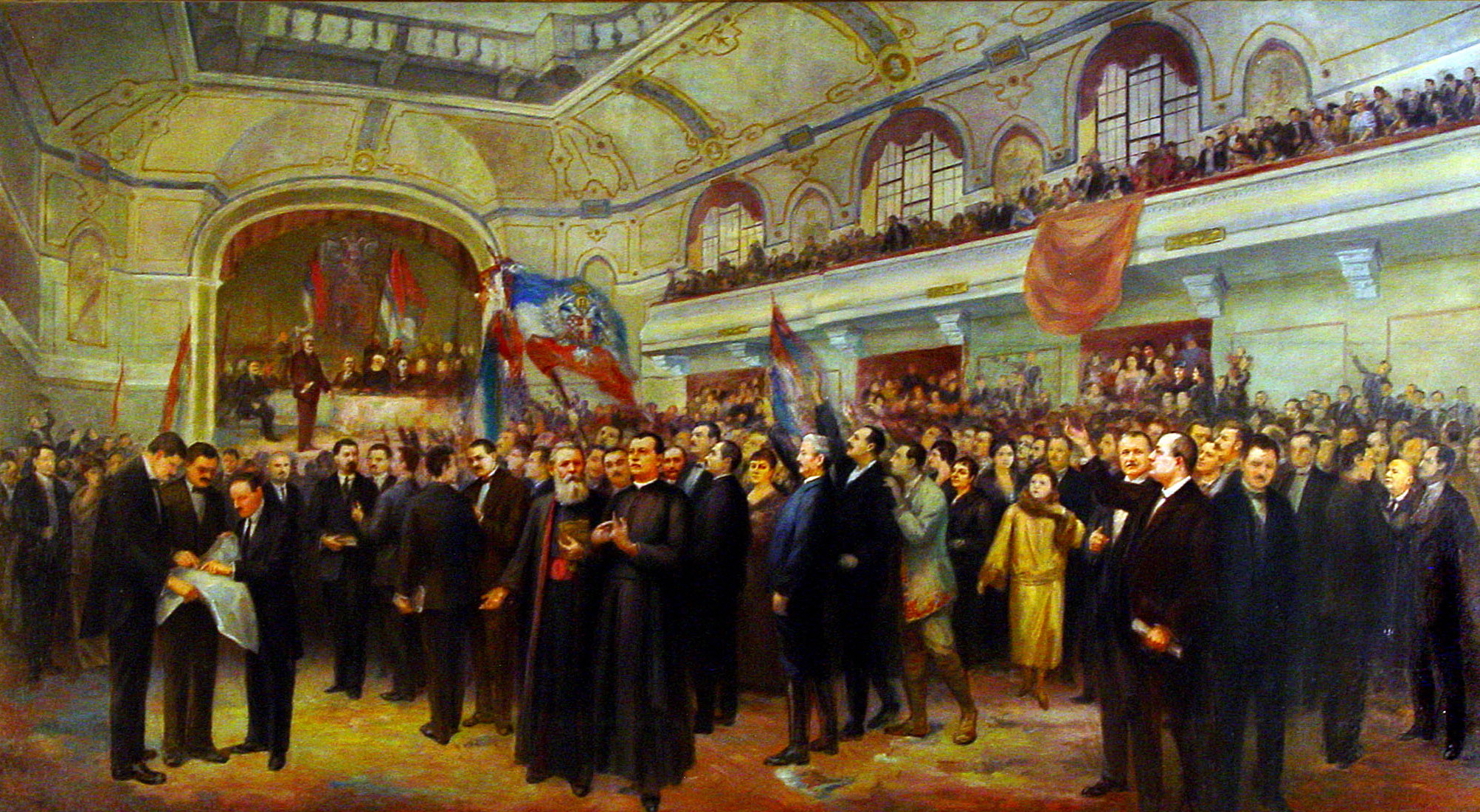
- The Great National Assembly in Novi Sad, painting by Anastas Bocarić (1864–1944).
- Date: 25 November 1918
- Location: Novi Sad, Austria-Hungary (now Serbia)
- Type: Political assembly
- Theme: Unification with Kingdom of Serbia
- Organised by: Serb National Committee, Novi Sad National Committee
- Participants: Representatives of Slavic peoples
- Outcome: Declaration of unification

The Great National Assembly was a political assembly held by representatives of Slavic peoples in Novi Sad on 25 November 1918, which proclaimed the secession of Banat, Bačka and Baranya regions from the already collapsed Austria-Hungary, and unification of those regions with the Kingdom of Serbia.

== Background ==
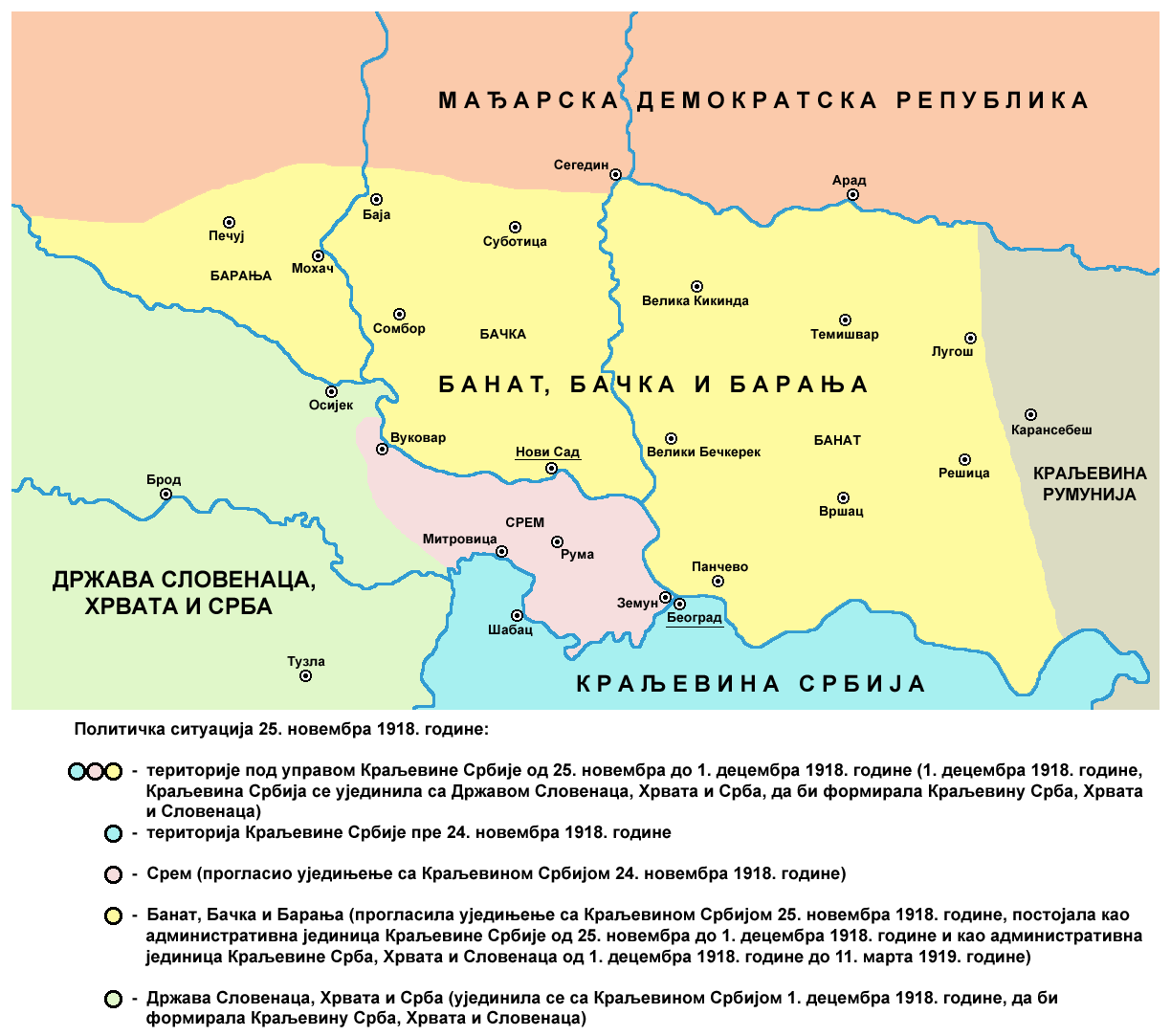
Banat, Bačka and Baranja in 1918

At the end of the First World War in the autumn of 1918, under the Armistice of Belgrade (13 November), armed forces of Austria-Hungary retreated from the territory of Délvidék (southern counties of the Kingdom of Hungary, including: Baranya, Bács-Bodrog, Torontál, Temes, Krassó-Szörény), and the region was possessed by the Allied Army of the Orient, thus allowing the Royal Serbian Army to establish effective control south of the Pécs-Baja-Szeged-Mureș line.

After the collapse of Austria-Hungary in late October-early November 1918, and the arrival of the Serbian Royal Army, the de facto administration in regions of Banat, Bačka and Baranja was taken over by local Serb and other Slavic leaders, and the process of gradual replacement of old administrative structures was initiated. That process was coordinated by the Serbian People's Committee from Novi Sad, that acted as the central body of the new administration. By that time, the process of political dissolution of Austria-Hungary was already initiated, and on 16 November (1918) the First Hungarian Republic was proclaimed, thus marking the end of the historical Kingdom of Hungary. Serbian and other Slavic inhabitants in regions of Srem, Banat, Bačka and Baranja saw the arrival of Allied forces as liberation, and welcomed the Serbian Royal Army, that possessed the region without combat operations, in accordance with the Armistice of Belgrade.

Serbia's wartime objectives during World War I included also the annexation of Vojvodina. The Austro-Hungarian authorities persecuted, arrested and interred prominent Serbs of Vojvodina immediately after the declaration of war in 1914. When the fall of Austria-Hungary was near, the Serbs in Vojvodina began to form committees, councils, and national guards in the largest towns. The Serb National Committee was formed on 31 October 1918 in Nagybecskerek (Zrenjanin) for the Novi Sad National Committee to be established on 3 November, to then convene the Great National Assembly in Novi Sad on 25 November which declared that Banat, Bačka, and Baranja would join the Kingdom of Serbia.

== Assembly ==
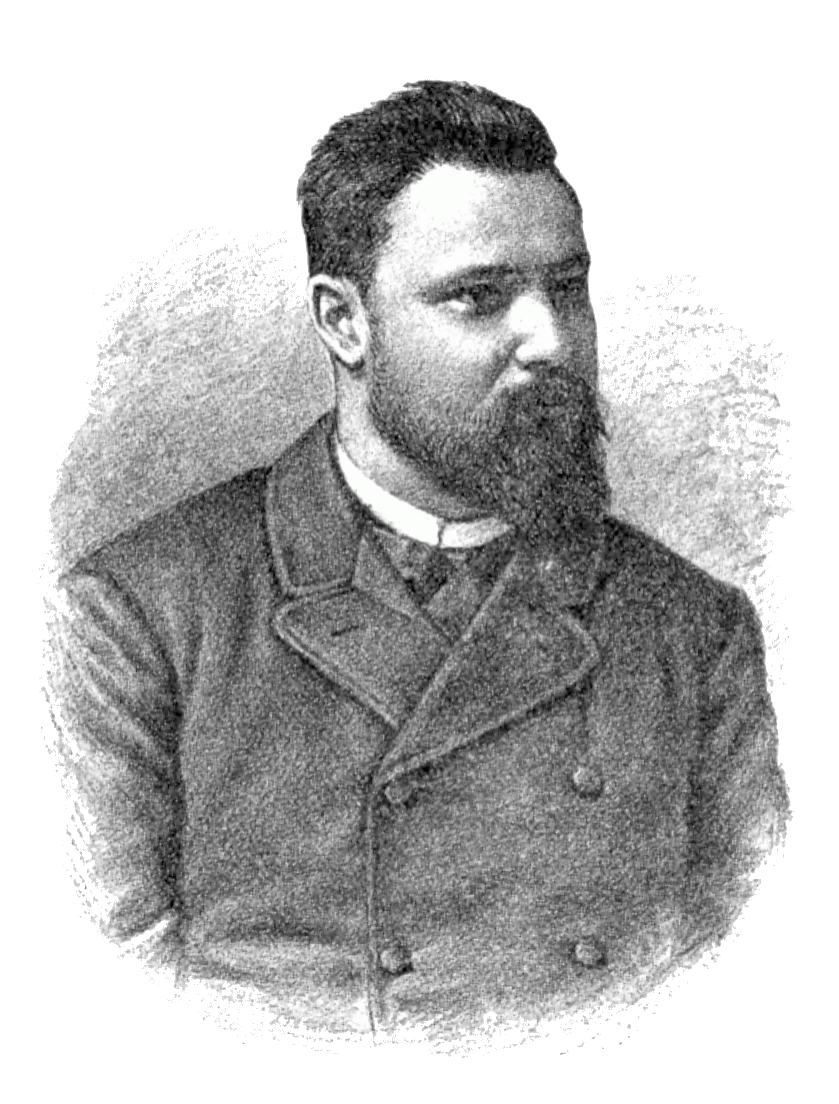
Jovan Hranilović (1855-1924), the first chairman of the Great People's Assembly

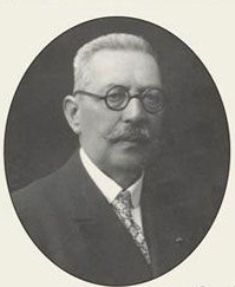
Jovan Lalošević (1870-1935), president of the provisional People's Administration for Banat, Bačka and Baranja (1918-1919)

On 25 November 1918 the Great People's Assembly of Serbs, Bunjevci and other Slavs from Banat, Bačka and Baranja was convened in Novi Sad, and declared the accession of these regions to the Kingdom of Serbia (there were a total of 757 delegates at the assembly, of which 578 Serbs, 84 Bunjevci, 62 Slovaks, 21 Ruthenians, 6 Germans, 3 Šokci, 2 Croats and 1 Hungarian). The assembly was held in Novi Sad, in the hotel "Grand Hotel Meyer" (today's building of Vojvođanska banka) and among the delegates were seven women.

According to the proclamation published on 17 November, Serbs, Bunjevci and other Slavs, both men and women, over the age of twenty, had the right to vote at the Great People's Assembly. Deputies were elected by municipalities, one deputy per thousand citizens, and they were elected by public assembly, by acclamation.

The Great People's Assembly was opened by Jovan Hranilović, a Greek Catholic priest, who was the oldest MP by age, and thus presided the session. Members of the Assembly represented 211 municipalities from Banat, Bačka and Baranja, and the session was also attended by representatives of Srem, members of the SNO Novi Sad, as well as Serbian and French officers who found themselves in Novi Sad. After the constitution of the Assembly was completed, the presidency was taken over by Ignjat Pavlas, who announced Jaša Tomić, the president of the SNO Novi Sad, as the submitter of the main decision. Jaša Tomić first addressed this historical gathering with a short speech, and then read the decisions of the Assembly.

The Great People's Assembly not only declared the unification of Banat, Bačka and Baranja with the Kingdom of Serbia, but also made a decision on the formation of a provisional provincial administration (representative and executive bodies) in these regions. The provisional representative body of the province was officially called the "Great People's Council", whose president was elected Slavko Miletić, while the provisional executive body was officially named "People's Administration for Banat, Bačka and Baranja", and Jovan Lalošević was elected its president.

On 1 December 1918, the Kingdom of Serbia united with the State of Slovenes, Croats and Serbs to form the Kingdom of Serbs, Croats and Slovenes, and thus Banat, Bačka and Baranja became parts of the newly created Yugoslav state.

== Decisions of the Assembly ==
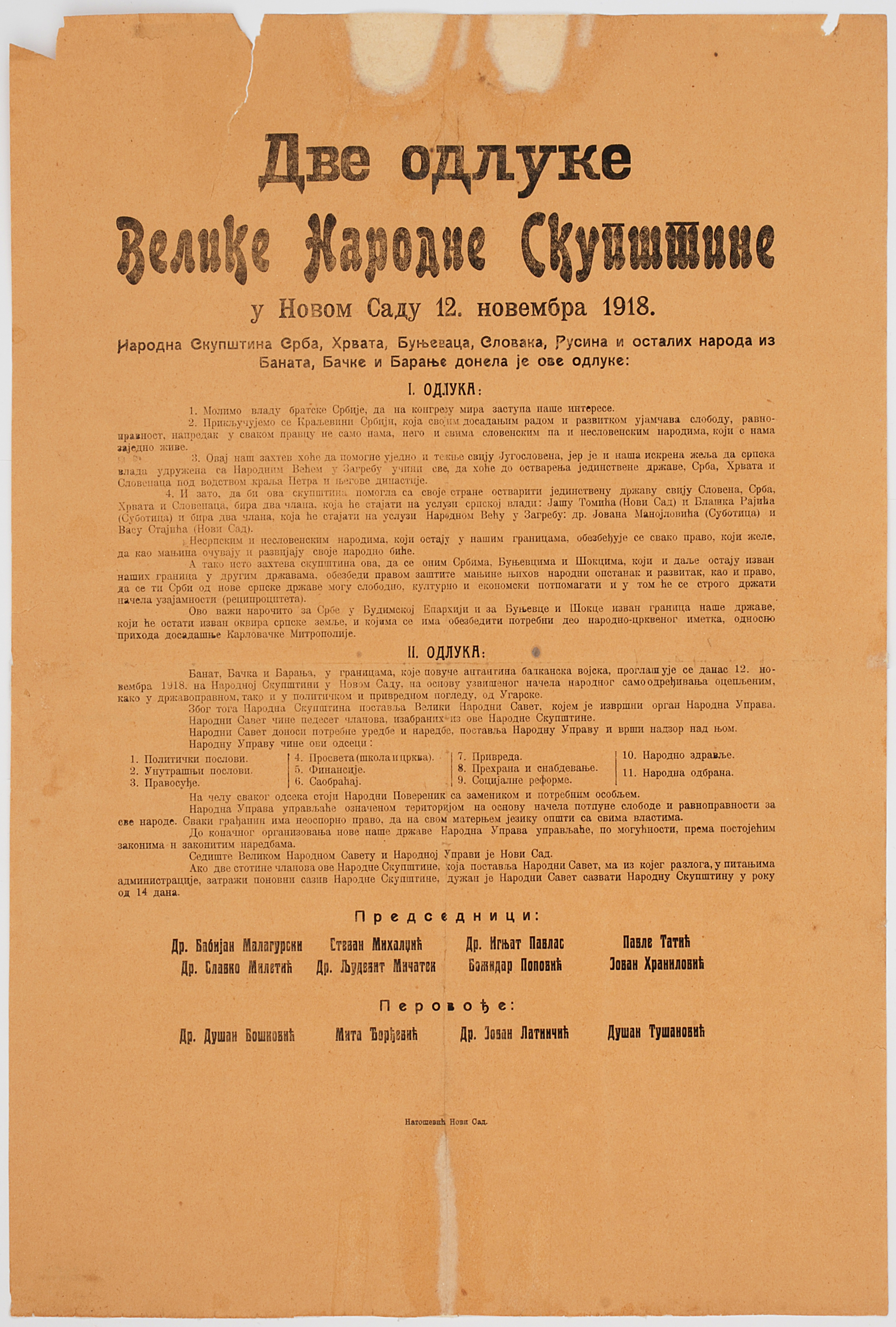
Decisions of the Great People's Assembly (1918)

Excerpts from the decisions of the Assembly:

- We ask the government of brotherly Serbia to represent our interests at the Peace Congress.
- We join the Kingdom of Serbia, which with its work and development so far guarantees freedom, equality, progress in every direction, not only to us, but also to all Slavic and even non-Slavic peoples who live with us.
- Non-Serb and non-Slavic peoples, who remain within our borders, are provided with every right, by which they want to preserve and develop their national being as a minority.
- Banat, Bačka and Baranja within the borders, withdrawn by the Entente's Balkan army, were proclaimed today, November 12 (25), 1918, at the Great People's Assembly, on the basis of the sublime principle of people's self-determination, seceded, both in state-legal, political and economic terms from Hungary.
- That is why the National Assembly appoints the Grand National Council, whose executive body is the People's Administration.
- The National Council consists of 50 members, elected from this National Assembly. The People's Council issues the necessary decrees and orders, appoints the National Administration and supervises it.
- The people's administration will manage the designated territory on the basis of the principles of complete freedom and equality for all peoples. Every citizen has the indisputable right to communicate with all authorities in their mother tongue.
- The seat of the Great People's Council and the People's Administration is Novi Sad.

== The division of the provinces between Serbia, Romania and Hungary ==
With the end of World War I, there were even bigger disputes between the states that had claims to certain territories. One of the biggest disputes on some of the territories of the Kingdom of Hungary was actually between Serbia and Romania. On the territory of the former Austrian crownland of the Voivodeship of Serbia and Banat of Temeschwar there was a big Serb population but also a large number of Romanians and Germans. The Kingdom of Serbia took over this area. However, with good diplomatic relations, the two countries found an adequate partition. According to the agreements that were previously signed, Hungary was also entitled to retain some of this territory, which eventually was concluded. Soon after this, the Kingdom of Serbs, Croats and Slovenes will be formed and territorial disputes with the Kingdom of Italy will be resolved very quickly. After that, the Kingdom of SCS was divided into several administrative areas and received international recognition.

After the annexation of Bačka and Baranya and the so-called Great People's Assembly of Serbs, Bunjevci and other Slavs was formed in Banat, Bačka and Baranja, which took full or partial control of these areas.

== See also ==
- Serbian National Board
- State of Slovenes, Croats and Serbs
- Kingdom of Serbs, Croats and Slovenes
- Creation of Yugoslavia
- Podgorica Assembly
- Banat Republic

== Annotations ==
1. The official documents of the assembly named it simply the "Great National Assembly" (Serbian: Велика народна скупштина, romanized: Velika narodna skupština), or, in longer form, "Great National Assembly of Serbs, Croats, Bunjevci, Slovaks, Rusyns, and Other Peoples from Banat, Bačka and Baranja". Serbian diplomat Jovan Jovanović Pižon called the assembly, at the time, the "Great National Assembly of Serbs, Bunjevci and other Slavs in Banat, Bačka and Baranja" (Serbian: Велика народна скупштина Срба, Буњеваца и осталих Словена у Банату, Бачкој и Барањи, romanized: Velika narodna skupština Srba, Bunjevaca i ostalih Slovena u Banatu, Bačkoj i Baranji). It is also known simply as the Novi Sad Assembly (Serbian: Новосадска скупштина, romanized: Novosadska skupština).

== Sources ==
- Cukić, Radovan; Kastratović-Ristić, Veselinka; Vasiljević, Marija (2019). The Day Worth a Century: 1. XII 1918 (PDF). Belgrade: Museum of Yugoslavia. Archived from the original on 2025-12-22.
- Dimić, Ljubodrag (2005). "Serbien und Jugoslawien (1918-1941)". Österreichische Osthefte. 47 (1–4): 231–264.
- Dimić, Ljubodrag (2015). "Serbian Historiography on the Great War". The Serbs and the First World War 1914-1918. Belgrade: Serbian Academy of Sciences and Arts. pp. 383–407.
- Gavrilović, Vladan (2023). "The Serbian Vojvodina: Idea and borders until 1918". Istraživanja: Journal of historical researches. 34: 112–120.
- Krestić, Vasilije (1997). History of the Serbs in Croatia and Slavonia 1848–1914. Belgrade: BIGZ. ISBN 978-86-13-00888-0.
- Krizman, Bogdan (1970). "The Belgrade Armistice of 13 November 1918". The Slavonic and East European Review. 48 (110): 67–87. JSTOR 4206164.
- Marković, Saša (2019). "US Political Views as a Decisive International Stronghold for Annexation of Vojvodina to the Kingdom of Serbia in 1918" (PDF). Serbian-American Relations: International Scientific Conference Proceedings. Novi Sad-Belgrade: Archives of Vojvodina; Institute for National and International Security. pp. 91–106. Archived from the original on 2025-12-22.
- Markus, Tomislav (2010). "The Serbian question in Croatian politics, 1848-1918". Review of Croatian History. 6: 165–188.
- Radojević, Mira (2020). "The question of Serbian national integration at the time of creation of the Yugoslav state in 1918". War, Peace and Nation-building (1853-1918). Belgrade-Roma: The Institute of History; Sapienza University of Rome, Research center CEMAS. pp. 11–29.
