= 1918 annexation of Vojvodina =

1918 addition of Vojvodina to Serbia

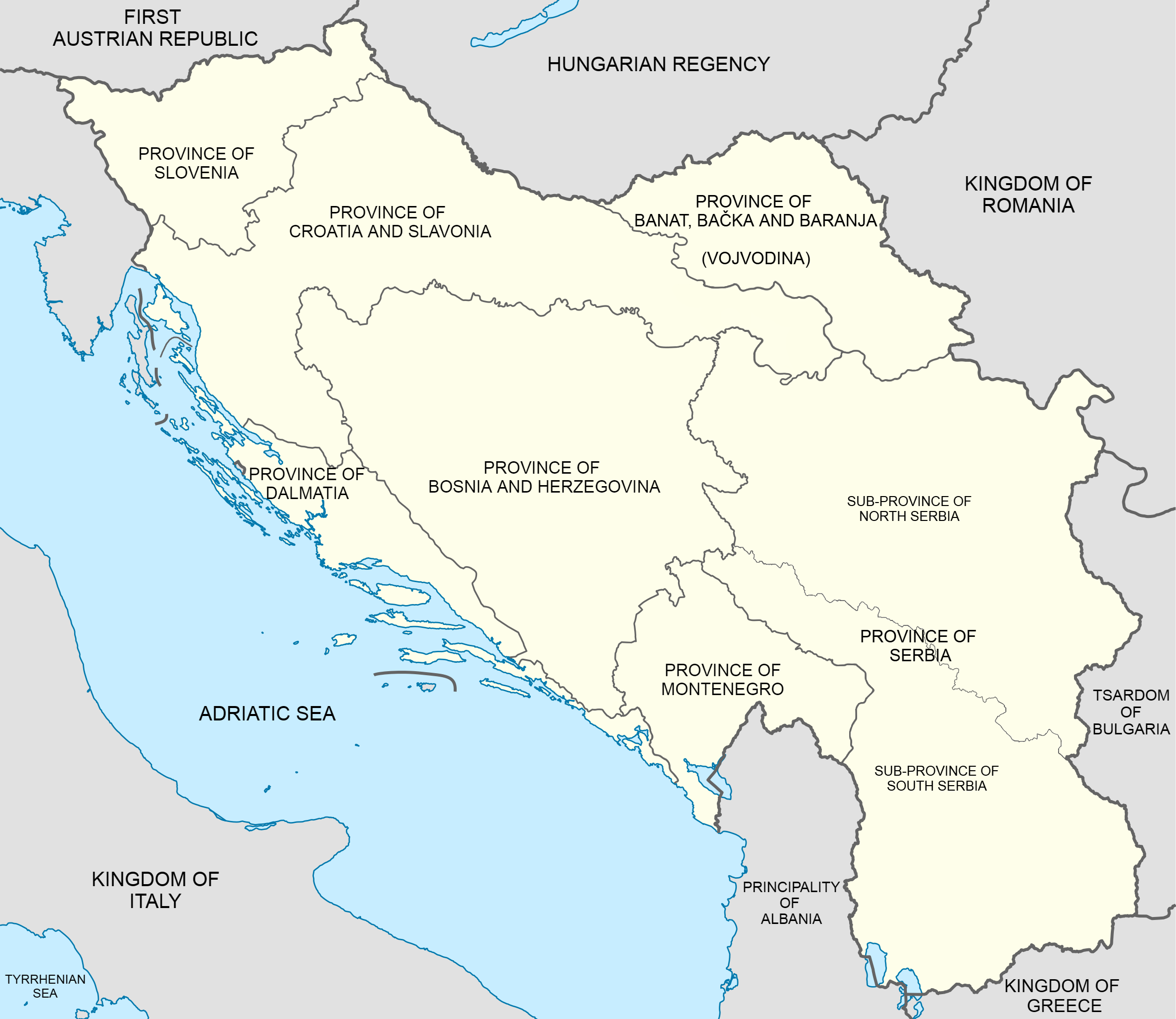
Provinces of the Kingdom of Serbs, Croats and Slovenes in 1918–1922

The annexation of Vojvodina to the Kingdom of Serbia was carried out in November 1918, at the end of First World War, in the context of the creation of Yugoslavia. The ethnically mixed region consisting of parts of Bačka, Banat and Baranya, collectively referred to as Vojvodina by the Serbs, had previously been a part of Austria-Hungary. Parts of the territory were promised by the Allies of the First World War to Serbia and Romania in return for participation in the war. At the same time, the National Council of Slovenes, Croats and Serbs based in Zagreb declared an independent state of the South Slavs living in Austria-Hungary at the time, with the intention of forming a wider South Slavic state with Serbia. The Serbian National Committee was convened in Subotica to prepare for the inclusion of Vojvodina into the future wider South Slavic state.

The Royal Serbian Army started to replace the Austro-Hungarian forces in the region following the Armistice of Villa Giusti. The boundaries of Serbian military occupation were determined by mid-November through the Armistice of Belgrade. As the Serbian army approached Novi Sad, the Serbian National Committee debated whether to join the unified state through annexation to Serbia or through representation in the Zagreb-based National Council and the State of Slovenes, Croats and Serbs. The body opted for the latter solution, but its decisions were annulled by the newly-established Serbian military administration.

Regent Alexander, supported by the army and Croatian Serb leader and National Council deputy president Svetozar Pribićević, decided to have Vojvodina annexed to Serbia before any unification. The move was meant to undermine the National Council in Zagreb and rescind acceptance of the recently adopted Geneva Declaration. The document was negotiated between the Serbian Prime Minister Nikola Pašić and the National Council to determine the constitutional framework of the South Slavic unified state. The declaration was accepted by Pašić under international pressure, but the document did not satisfy the interests of Regent Alexander.

After repudiation of the Geneva Declaration, the Great People's Assembly of Serbs, Bunjevci and other Slavs in Banat, Bačka and Baranja was convened in Novi Sad as a popular assembly to give the annexation the guise of self-determination and legitimacy. The delegates largely consisted of representatives of various Slavic ethnic groups of Vojvodina – amounting to 38% of the total population at the time. Non-Slavs, deemed enemy nations, received only token representation. The method of annexation of Vojvodina and the treatment of the National Council caused resentment, especially by the Hungarians towards the Allies and the Croats against the Croatian Serbs. Historian Charles Ingrao and philosopher and legal scholar Lazar Vrkatić argue that the episode helped shape Alexander's later authoritarian approach to governing the Kingdom of Serbs, Croats and Slovenes (later renamed Yugoslavia).

== Background ==
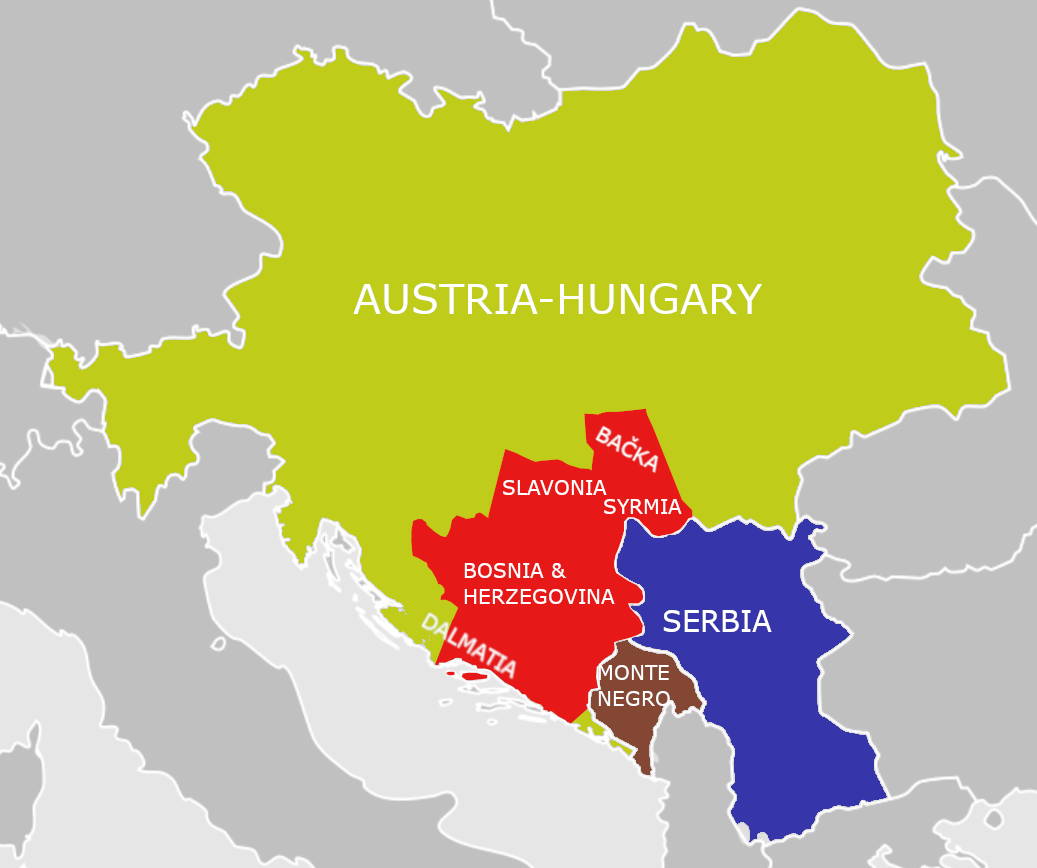
Approximate extent of territorial promises (red) to Serbia at the expense of Austria-Hungary made around the time of the conclusion of the Treaty of London

Over the course of First World War, prewar ideas regarding political consolidation of parts of Austria-Hungary inhabited by the South Slavs were developed under the influence of wartime events. Initially, such designs involved proposals to revise the Compromise of 1867 and introduce trialism in Austria-Hungary. Those efforts culminated with the unsuccessful 1917 May Declaration championed by Anton Korošec.

In late 1914, while defending against the Austro-Hungarian invasion, the government of the Kingdom of Serbia announced its objectives in the Niš Declaration, calling for the liberation of "unliberated brothers", referring to the South Slavic population of Austria-Hungary. In 1915, the Triple Entente sought to entice the Kingdom of Italy to join the war as an Allied Power by offering it various territories, including portions of Austro-Hungarian eastern Adriatic Sea coast such as Dalmatia and Julian March (including Istria), under the Treaty of London. At roughly the same time, the Triple Entente offered Serbia Bačka, Bosnia, Herzegovina, Syrmia, and Slavonia as compensation for territories expected to be offered to Bulgaria in order to obtain alliance with that country. The region of Banat was promised to the Kingdom of Romania in 1916, but separate Romanian peace with the Central Powers voided the promise.

A group of Dalmatian politicians led by Frano Supilo and Ante Trumbić set up the Yugoslav Committee with the aim of promoting the detachment of lands inhabited by the South Slavs from Austria-Hungary. Following unsuccessful attempts by Serbia to influence the Triple Entente to apply the principle of self-determination to the South Slavic lands, the Yugoslav Committee endorsed the idea of a political union of the Austro-Hungarian South Slav-inhabited lands and Serbia and the creation of Yugoslavia. The Yugoslav Committee saw the unification as a matter of necessity required to prevent partitioning of Croatia between Italy, Serbia, and Hungary. In 1917, representatives of the Yugoslav Committee and the government of Serbia issued the Corfu Declaration of their intent to achieve the union.

In the final days of the war, as the dissolution of Austria-Hungary was unfolding, the National Council of Slovenes, Croats and Serbs, chaired by Korošec, was established as the governing body of the South Slavs living in Austria-Hungary and the short-lived State of Slovenes, Croats and Serbs after the empire's breakup. All South-Slavic inhabited lands of the former Austria-Hungary were represented in the National Council, except Bačka and Banat – which were allocated seats in the council, but the seats were largely left vacant.

== Ethnic background ==
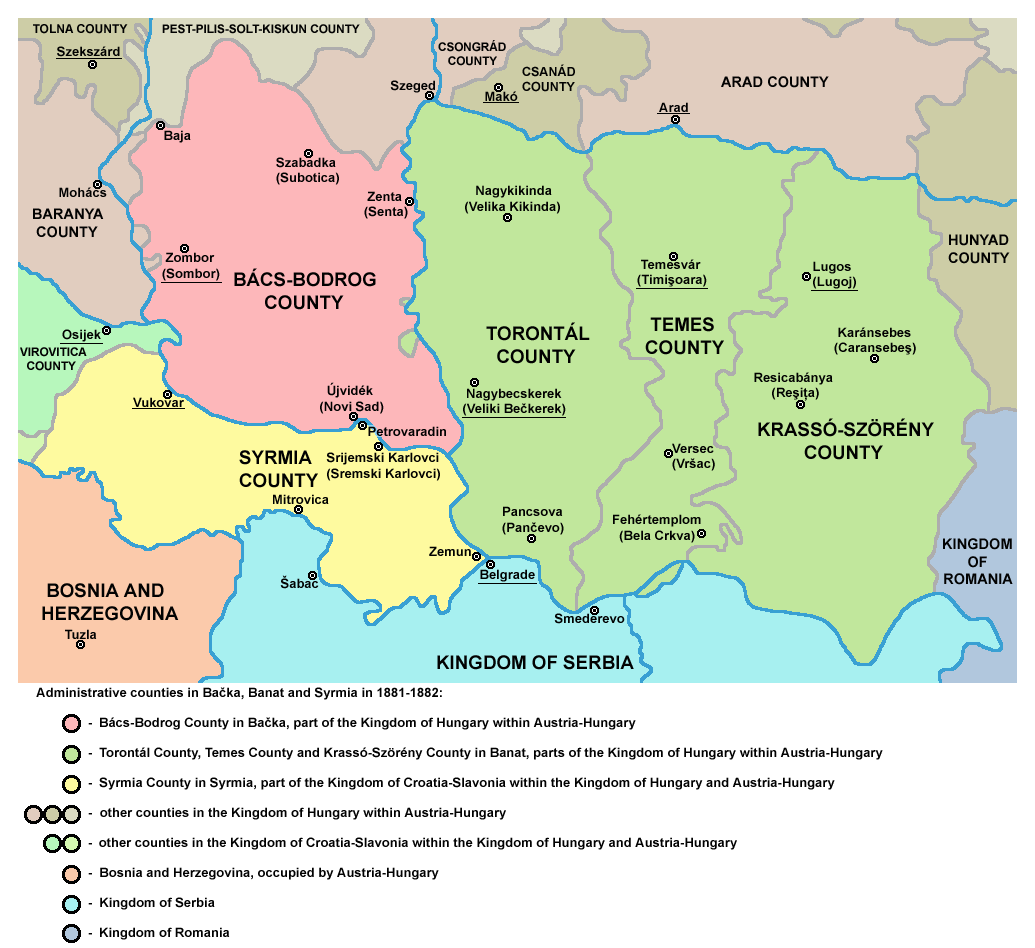
Map of the former Hungarian counties comprising Banat, Bačka, and Baranya

The territories of historical regions of Banat, Bačka, and Baranya largely corresponded to five counties of the former Kingdom of Hungary. According to the 1910 census, the territory was multi-ethnic with substantial Hungarian, German (Danube Swabian), Romanian, and Serbian communities. Bačka largely corresponded with the Bács-Bodrog County, with a population of 812,385 of which 45% were Hungarians, 24% Germans and 18% Serbs. Banat largely corresponded with the Temes, Torontál, and Krassó-Szörény counties: Temes County had a population of 500,835, of which 34% were Romanians, 33% Germans, 16% Hungarians and 14% Serbs; Torontál County had a population of 615,151, of which 33% were Serbs, 30% Germans, 21% Hungarians, and 14% Romanians; and Krassó-Szörény County had a population of 466,147 of which 72% were Romanians, 12% were Germans, 7% were Hungarians, and 3% were Serbs. Baranya County had 352,478 inhabitants and a Hungarian majority (57%); the most numerous minority were Germans (32%), followed by Serbs (4%) and Croats (3%). The five counties had the combined population of 2.75 million. The plurality was Hungarian (29%) and the second-largest group were Germans (25%), followed by Romanians (22%). Serbs comprised 16%.

According to the 1910 census, Serbs and Croats accounted for one third of the population inhabiting the portion of the five former counties' territory that would ultimately be assigned to the postwar Kingdom of Serbs, Croats and Slovenes as defined by the Paris Peace Conference. All Slavic ethnic groups combined amounted to 38%, and Serbs formed a vast majority among them. Just under 33% of the population were Hungarians, almost 24% were Germans, and 5% were Romanians. Serbs named the collective territories of Baranja, Bačka and Banat Vojvodina. There was a significant territorial overlap of Bačka and Banat with the historical crownland of the Austrian Empire named the Voivodeship of Serbia and Banat of Temeschwar. The crownland was established by Emperor Franz Joseph I as a reward for Serbian services to the empire in quelling of the Hungarian Revolution of 1848 and returned to Hungary a decade later as a step towards the Austro-Hungarian Compromise.

== Prelude ==
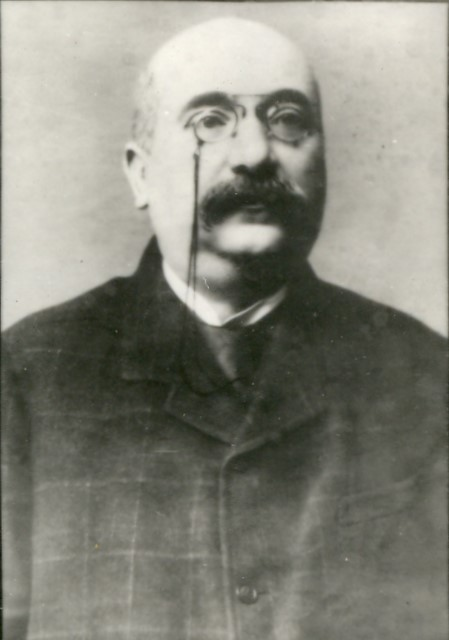
Jaša Tomić was an early advocate of annexation of Vojvodina to Serbia.

Vojvodina's Serbs were predominantly supportive of leaving Austria-Hungary, but were divided on the method – through the National Council in Zagreb or through close ties with Serbia. A meeting was held in Subotica on 2 October on the initiative of Tihomir Ostojić, secretary of the Matica srpska. It produced a resolution endorsing unification of the South Slavs, expressing the frustration of the Serbs and the Croats in Bačka, Banat, and Baranya with Hungarian rule, and declaring support of the work of the National Council in Zagreb. Another meeting was convened in Subotica on 23–24 October to implement the resolution. At the meeting, writer Vasa Stajić was appointed a member of the National Council in Zagreb as the representative of Vojvodina. Early support for the National Council was replaced by the view that the territories should be annexed by Serbia outright. The annexation was championed by Jaša Tomić of the Serb People's Radical Party, who believed that the move would strengthen Serbian position in negotiations with the National Council. Tomić supported Hungarian government until the conference held in Subotica on 27 October, where his party decided to reverse course.

The short-lived autonomous Banat Republic, nominally within Hungary, was declared in the region of Banat. On 1 November, the Banat National Council led by Otto Roth proclaimed the republic in Timișoara, relying on support from the Hungarian and German communities. Two days later, on 3 November, the Serbian National Committee was established in the Matica srpska building in Novi Sad. On the basis of information learned through private contacts by Ignjat Pavlas, the body concluded that withdrawal of Austro-Hungarian troops from the region was imminent and decided to take power once it occurred, dispatching a delegation headed by Pavlas to Belgrade to request deployment of the Royal Serbian Army to Vojvodina.

== Military takeover ==
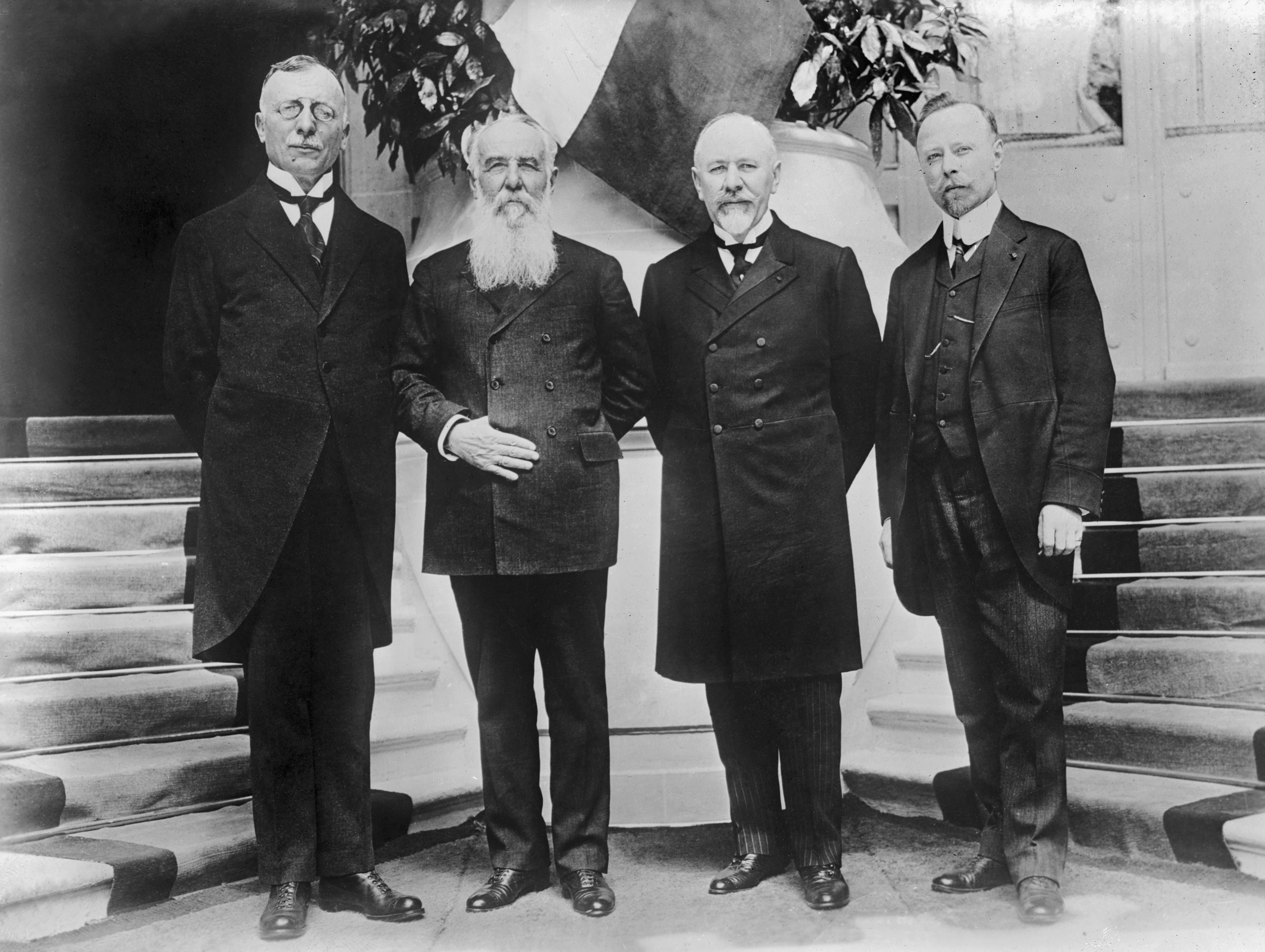
Yugoslav Committee president Ante Trumbić and Serbian Prime Minister Nikola Pašić (first and the second from the left)

On 2 November, Serbian Prime Minister Nikola Pašić, after learning of the imminent signing of the Armistice of Villa Giusti to end the hostilities with Austria-Hungary, told Field Marshal Živojin Mišić, Chief of the Serbian General Staff, that the Serbian forces should occupy parts of Austria-Hungary, including Banat, Syrmia, and Bosnia. The following day, Mišić informed Field Marshal Petar Bojović that the Romanians might attempt to capture Banat and that he thought it necessary to pre-empt such a move by advancing to the Bela Crkva – Vršac – Timișoara line. Two days later, the Serbian supreme command, located at Niš at the time, accepted Mišić's idea, specifying that the army should advance 10 kilometres (6.2 miles) further East from that line. The same day, the Serbian army crossed the Danube at Kovin, establishing a bridgehead in Banat. General Louis Franchet d'Espèrey, as the commanding officer of the Allied Army of the Orient, learned of Armistice of Villa Giusti. When he asked Paris for instructions how to proceed, he was told to continue negotiations with Hungarian representatives on a separate armistice. The Serbian army slowed down the negotiations by delaying deliveries of telegrams between the negotiators and the supreme command to allow its troops to capture territory desired by Regent Alexander.

On 8 November, Bojović ordered the Morava Division to advance in Banat to the line originally indicated by Mišić. He also ordered the Danube Division to capture Bačka by advancing to the Baja – Subotica – Szeged line, and the Drina Division was to advance into Croatia-Slavonia and occupy the region of Syrmia and beyond, to the Brod – Osijek – Pécs line spanning the regions of Slavonia and Baranya. The troops captured Bela Crkva the same day. On 9 November, the Serbian troops reached Vršac in Banat and, moving through Syrmia, crossed the Danube at Petrovaradin to enter Novi Sad in Bačka. As the troops were approaching the city, the Serbian National Committee planned a takeover of civilian control over the city, but the Serbian army disarmed a militia established by the committee. The army declined recognising the Serbian National Committee or its decisions or any civilian authority. Military administration was introduced and Serbian law was applied in Vojvodina, de facto annexing the territory.

On 11 November, as Germany surrendered, Supreme Allied Commander Marshal Ferdinand Foch ordered cessation of hostilities. d'Esprey clarified that the order also applied to fighting against Hungary, but the order was intentionally disregarded by Serbian forces. The same day, Mišić extended the area of Banat to capture to the Orșova – Lugoj – Timişoara line and a few kilometres to its East, regardless of the presence of Allied troops. The Armistice of Belgrade was agreed upon between the Allies and Hungary on 13 November, allowing Serbian troops to occupy Banat, Bačka, parts of Baranya, Subotica, and Pécs. Subotica was captured the same day, and Pécs on 14 November. Timişoara, Orşava, and Lugoj were captured by the Serbian troops on 15 November; Sombor, and Senta the following day, and the part of Arad south of Mureş was captured on 21 November. The Banat Republic ended in mid-November with the arrival of Serbian and French troops, and was initially entirely administered by Serbia.

== Competing approaches to unification ==
=== Geneva Declaration ===
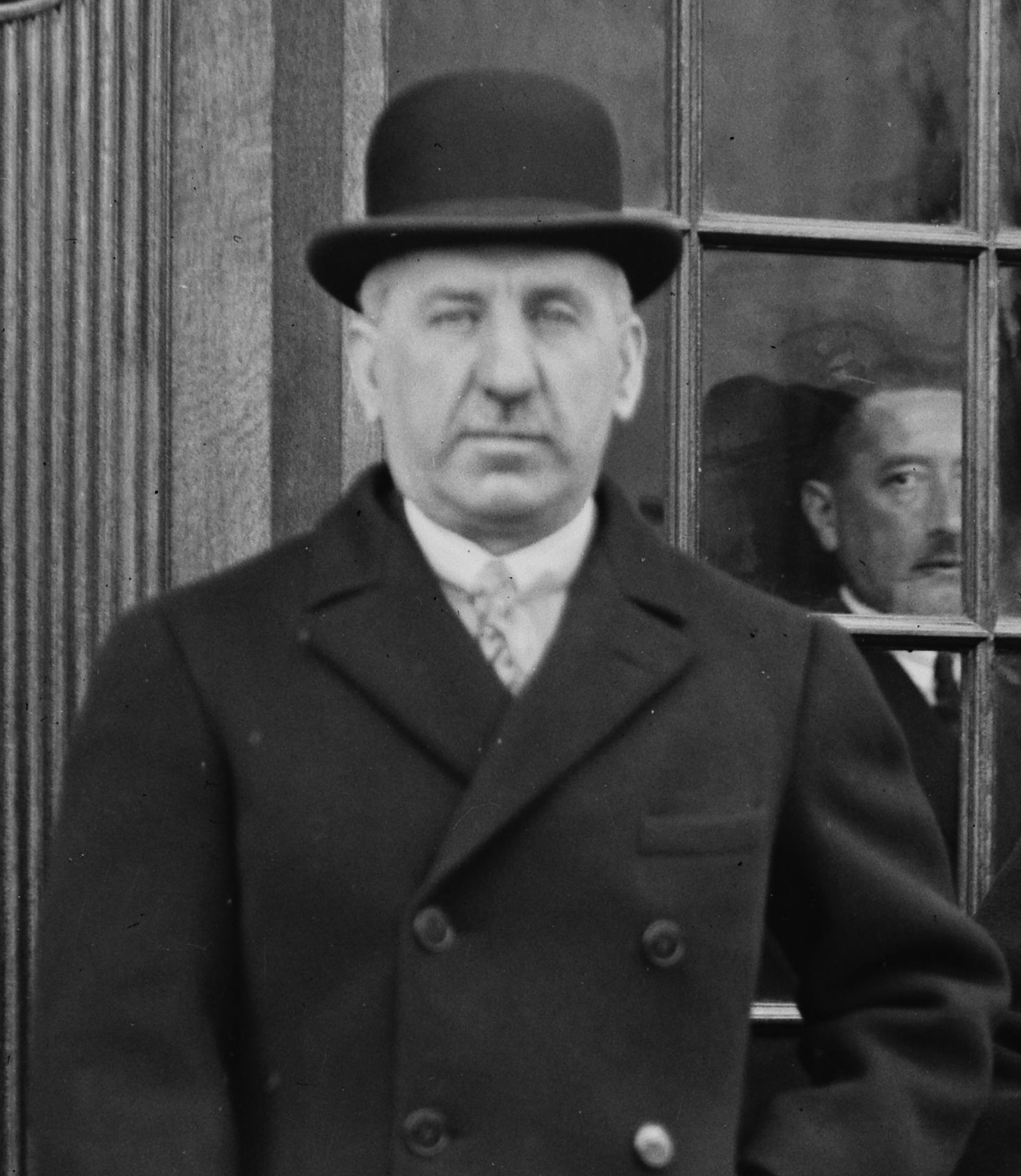
Momčilo Ninčić conveyed government instructions to Jaša Tomić and Petar Konjović.

In the first days of November, Momčilo Ninčić met Tomić and Petar Konjović separately on behalf of the Government of Serbia. Ninčić endorsed Tomić's view that the National Council in Zagreb should be ignored in Vojvodina, and Konjović's opposite position. The Serbian National Committee met to discuss the method of unification on 4 November, where Tomić and Konjović reported on their respective meetings. The committee then voted, with only two out of 50 members dissenting, to work towards the unification through the National Council in Zagreb unless the council abandons the project of political unification of the South Slavs. The conflicting instructions were the result of Regent Alexander's policy designed to ensure the cooperation of the National Council in Zagreb in the unification project. He was prepared to concede whatever was necessary to the National Council for the purpose, while taking actions to limit its demands as much as possible. Therefore, the conflicting instructions were to ensure continued support for both annexation of Vojvodina to Serbia and, if necessary, the inclusion of Vojvodina in the State of Slovenes, Croats and Serbs.

On 3 November, British Prime Minister David Lloyd George and Foreign Secretary Arthur Balfour informed the Serbian government and opposition, as well as Korošec and Trumbić through intermediaries, that no South Slavic union would be considered unless they worked together towards that objective. For this purpose, Pašić recognised the National Council in Zagreb as the legal government of South Slavs living in the territory of talks that produced the Geneva Declaration on the constitution of the future common state of the South Slavs, preserving sovereignty of Serbia as well as that of the State of Slovenes, Croats and Serbs organised on the territory once ruled by Austria-Hungary. The declaration was signed on 9 November.

=== Regent steps in ===
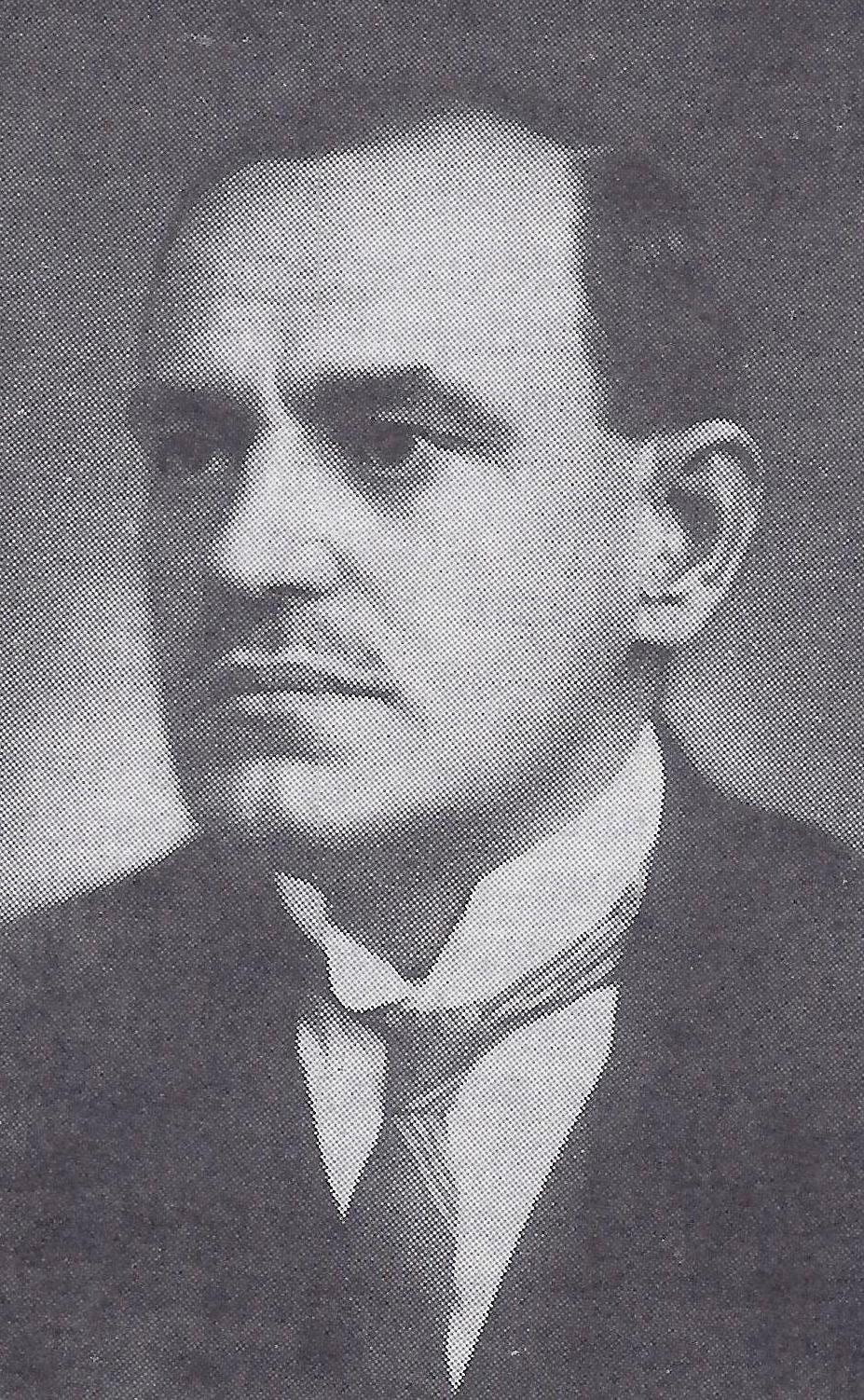
Svetozar Pribićević allied himself with Regent Alexander in pursuit of a centralised state.

On 11 November, two days after the Serbian army took over Novi Sad and voided the decisions of the Serb National Committee, Regent Alexander decided to transform the military occupation of Vojvodina through political decisions on the region's future. In order to give the appearance of self-determination and legitimacy, preparations were made for a popular assembly. A working group was summoned to Belgrade to receive instructions on organisation of an assembly and the decisions it was expected to adopt – to demand the immediate unification of all Serbs, Croats, and Slovenes with Serbia under the House of Karađorđević. The group was to convene a conference attended by fifteen delegates: seven each from Bačka and Banat, and one from Baranya. The plan was communicated to Croatian Serb leader and National Council deputy president Svetozar Pribićević as an ally supportive of speedy, unconditional unification with Serbia. Pribićević met with Stajić and told him that the Serb National Committee needed to sever ties with the National Council. Communication between Regent Alexander and Pribićević went through Valerijan Pribićević, Svetozar’s younger brother who had been appointed by the National Council as its representative in Belgrade on 8 November.

On 12 November, Pašić tended his resignation. According to historian Sabrina P. Ramet, Pašić was compelled to step down by Regent Alexander to undermine the Geneva Declaration. Historian Charles Ingrao and philosopher and legal scholar Lazar Vrkatić agreed with Ramet, arguing that Regent Alexander undermined the Geneva Declaration because it deprived Serbia of the role of the sole leader of the political unification of the South Slavs and did not guarantee the House of Karađorđević the right to rule over the entire country. Historian Ivo Banac assessed the move as a tactic designed to commit the National Council in Zagreb and the Yugoslav Committee to speedy unification while relying on Svetozar Pribićević to undermine Korošec's authority in the National Council. Ingrao and Vrkatić argue that Regent Alexander preferred ruling a larger South Slavic state to ruling only an enlarged Serbia. They further describe his use of the Greater Serbia option as a form of pressure on Croat representatives during negotiations over the future state's constitution.

=== Simović arrives in Zagreb ===
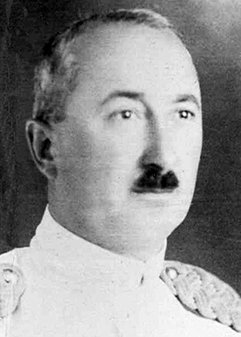
Dušan Simović was appointed representative of the Royal Serbian Army in Zagreb in 1918.

The National Council in Zagreb faced pressure from civil unrest, violence by returning Green Cadres, and a reported coup d'état conspiracy, and the advancing Italian Army trying to capture the territory promised in the Treaty of London. In response, the National Council requested the Serbian army to help maintain order. On 13 November, when the Armistice of Belgrade was signed, Lieutenant Colonel Dušan Simović arrived in Zagreb as the representative of the Serbian army supreme command. Simović was welcomed by National Council deputy presidents Svetozar Pribićević and Ante Pavelić, Ivan Lorković, and others. On this occasion, Lorković or Pavelić (sources disagree) spoke of the State of Slovenes, Croats and Serbs, as an entity independent of Serbia, united with Serbia in a federation. Simović was tasked with warning that Serbia might annex some of the territories of the State of Slovenes, Croats and Serbs if the National Council in Zagreb were uncooperative. Therefore, Simović pointed out that Serbia was victorious in the war and was promised Slavonia to the Osijek – Đakovo – Šamac line, Bosnia and Herzegovina, and Dalmatia south of Cape Planka, adding that it would take those territories unless the unification was carried out. This caused Pavelić to walk back the idea of a federation. Simović's threat was interpreted as a credible threat to establish Greater Serbia, and leave a rump Croatia outside the new South Slavic State. On 14 November, Pašić informed Trumbić and Korošec that the Geneva Declaration was rejected by the Serbian government and by Regent Alexander because the war cabinet would not swear an oath to the Serbian king, and it would not answer to him.

== Novi Sad assembly ==
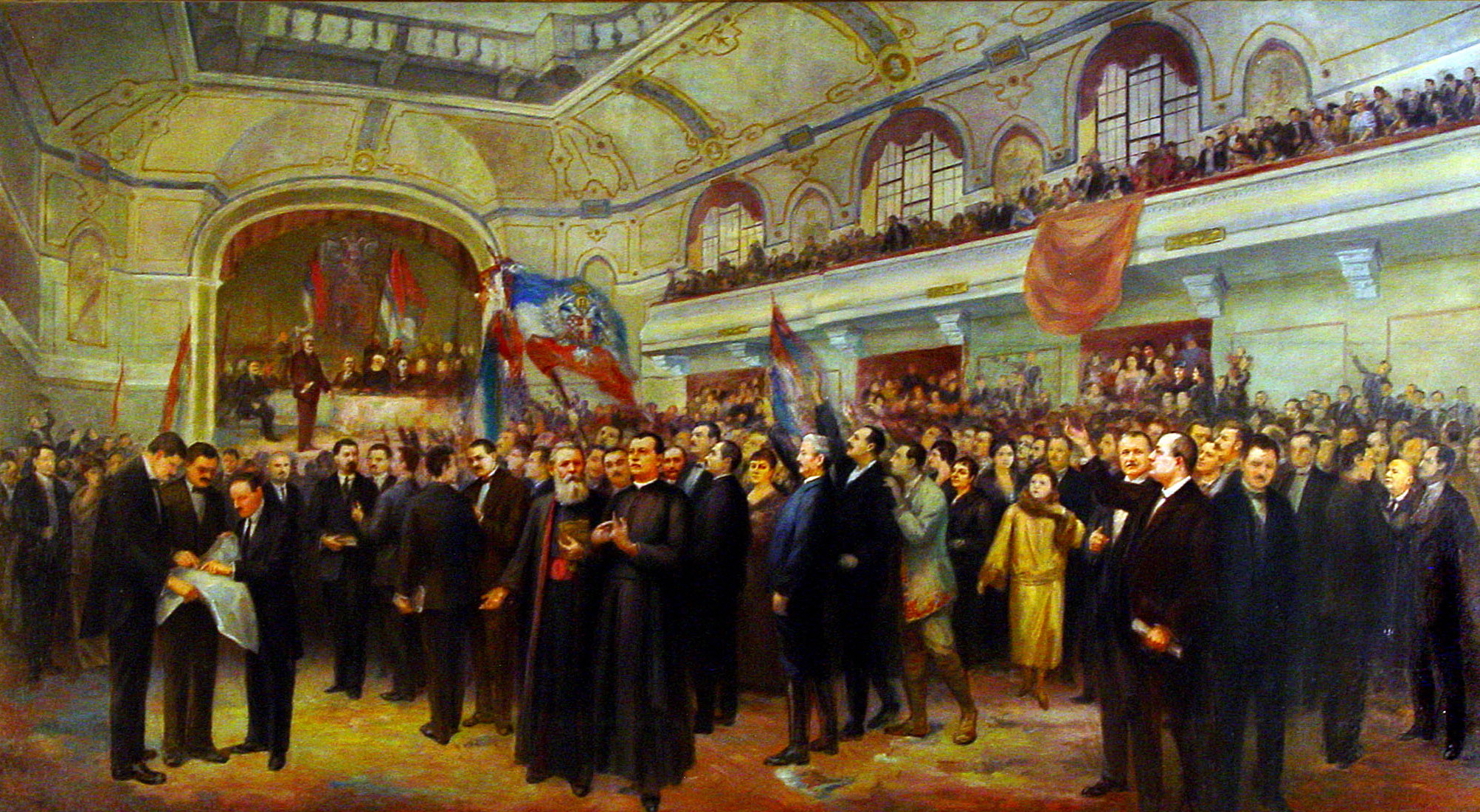
Depiction of the 25 November Novi Sad assembly by Anastas Bocarić

On 17 November, a conference was convened in Novi Sad in compliance with instructions from the Serbian Government and elections were announced for the Great People's Assembly of Serbs, Bunjevci and other Slavs in Banat, Bačka and Baranja. The purpose of the assembly was to consult the Slavic population of Vojvodina for their opinions. Voting rights were granted to men and women over the age of 20 and all eligible voters were also declared eligible to be elected delegates to the assembly.

According to historian Marko Attila Hoare, the women's suffrage might have been intended as a way to make the apparent size of the Slavic electorate greater. The organisers excluded from the vote members of the nations deemed enemies – Hungarians and Germans. Romanians were excluded due to the Romanian intentions to annex Banat to Romania. As a result, for example, in Zrenjanin, a city of 26,000, only 8,750 men and women, members of the Serbian Orthodox Church municipality aged 20 and over, had the right to vote. The elections were announced by a town crier and held in the form of a public assembly on 22 November.

The elections produced 757 delegates to the assembly claiming to represent Banat, Bačka and Baranja. Those included 578 Serbs, 84 Bunjevci, 3 Šokci, 2 Croats, 62 Slovaks, 21 Ruthenians, 6 Germans and a single Hungarian. The non-Slavic population of Vojvodina, which exceeded 60% of the total, was represented in the Assembly by 1% of the delegates. The assembly held in Novi Sad on 25 November produced two resolutions. The first resolution, which was quickly accepted by the Serbian government, specified that the territory was a part of Serbia and formally asked the Government of Serbia to represent Banat, Bačka and Baranja at the upcoming Paris Peace Conference. The second resolution announced the establishment of a regional National Council to administer the territory and that the new border was determined by the army’s advance. The resolution was in breach of an earlier decision by the Allies determining that only the Paris Peace Conference may determine national borders. According to Ingrao and Vrkatić, the second resolution effectively upheld application of the existing (Hungarian) law in Vojvodina, but the Serbian Government recognised neither the National Council nor laws other than those of Kingdom of Serbia as effective in Vojvodina.

== Aftermath ==
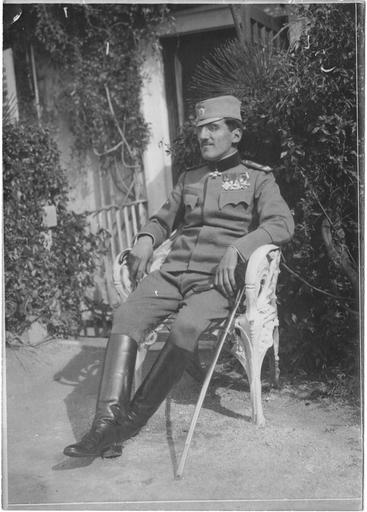
Regent Alexander, who supported the annexation of Vojvodina to Serbia before the proclamation of the Kingdom of Serbs, Croats and Slovenes

The National Council in Zagreb sent a delegation to Regent Alexander to seek unification. On 1 December, he received the delegation and proclaimed the Kingdom of Serbs, Croats and Slovenes (later renamed Yugoslavia) through the unification of Serbia with the lands of the State of Slovenes, Croats and Serbs, avoiding mention of Vojvodina or Bačka, Banat, and Baranja. They were omitted, like Montenegro, because annexation of those areas to Serbia was already deemed completed. While the administrations of the lands included in the State of Slovenes, Croats and Serbs remained in place until adoption of the new Vidovdan Constitution, Vojvodina and Montenegro were denied any such autonomy.

The annexation of Vojvodina was carried out in a manner that contributed to establishment of Regent Alexander and the Serbian army as the only real actors in the process that joined the region with Serbia. Ingrao and Vrkatić concluded that actions of Svetozar Pribićević made the annexation possible and that the method of the annexation prompted Regent Alexander to become an authoritarian ruler. It also meant that the unification of 1 December took place in a manner different from the will of the Slovenes and the Croats, causing resentment against the Croatian Serbs. Vojvodina, organised as the province of Banat, Bačka, and Baranja, quickly ceased to exist in the new state. Serb political elites in Vojvodina were strong supporters of unitarist constitution of Yugoslavia in order to avoid regional autonomy where Serbs would not have the majority.

Borders of Yugoslav Banat, Bačka, and Baranja were formed only after Yugoslavia was proclaimed. The area under control of the Serbian army was first reduced on initiative of French General Henri Mathias Berthelot. He turned the eastern part of Banat over to Romanian control. The Allied decision to partition Banat was made in June 1919 but rejected by Romania until it was pressured to accept it in December 1919. The Treaty of Trianon, which concluded in June 1920, determined the Hungarian–Yugoslav border in Baranya and Bačka, as well as the Romanian–Yugoslav border in Banat. The treaty awarded one-third of the region to Yugoslavia, and the rest to Romania. The Serbian (and subsequently Yugoslav) army continued occupation of a strip of land around the towns of Pécs and Baja, originally placed under its control by the Armistice of Belgrade but left to Hungary by the Treaty of Trianon until August 1921. At the scheduled time of the withdrawal, the Yugoslavs established a short-lived puppet state of the Serbian–Hungarian Baranya–Baja Republic meant to be used as a leverage against Hungary and a pretext for a further delay of the pullout. The meaning of the Hungarian toponym Délvidék changed in response to events of November 1918; previously, it referred to the collective regions of Bačka and Banat, but following 1918, its meaning was narrowed to the territories annexed by Serbia and thus included in Yugoslavia.

Before the Armistice of Belgrade and subsequent annexation of Vojvodina, the Hungarian public believed that the Allies would somehow reward pacifist pronouncements of the new Hungarian Prime Minister Mihály Károlyi. Given that much hope had been placed in the principles of Wilsonianism, the terms of the armistice led to widespread disillusionment. Many Hungarians grew bitter, not only because they found the terms of the armistice unjust, but also due to the real and perceived breaches of those terms. According to Ingrao and Vrkatić, the annexation of Vojvodina is among such breaches. The number of discontent people grew further with the return of demobilised Hungarian troops, released prisoners of war and refugees from the occupied territories. The Károlyi government lost further support as it instituted a policy of land reform – criticised as too radical by landowners and as half-hearted by others. Dissatisfied conservatives grouped around Károlyi's brother Gyula, whereas dissatisfied former officers were led by Gyula Gömbös. The leader of the Communist Party of Hungary, Béla Kun, appealed to the proletariat.

== Sources ==
- Banac, Ivo (1984). The National Question in Yugoslavia: Origins, History, Politics. Ithaca: Cornell University Press. ISBN 0-8014-1675-2.
- Fajth, Gáspár; Gyulay, Ferenc; Klinger, András; Harcsa, István; Kamarás, Ferenc; Csahók, István; Ehrlich, Éva (1992). Történeti statisztikai idősorok 1867–1992 I.: Népesség-népmozgalom (in Hungarian). Hungarian Central Statistical Office. ISBN 978-963-7070-43-3. Archived from the original on 2 June 2019.
- Hoare, Marko Attila (2024). Serbia: A Modern History. London: Hurst Publishers. ISBN 978-1-80526-157-5.
- Ingrao, Charles W.; Vrkatić, Lazar (2001). Unlearnt Lesson: Central-European Idea and Serb National Program. Belgrade: Helsinki Committee for Human Rights in Serbia. ISBN 978-86-7208-048-3.
- Janković, Dragoslav (1964). "Ženevska konferencija o stvaranju jugoslovenske zajednice 1918. godine" [Geneva Conference on Creation of the Yugoslav Community in 1918]. Istorija XX veka [History of the 20th Century] (in Serbian). Vol. V. Belgrade: Institute of Legal History of the University of Belgrade Faculty of Law. pp. 225–262. OCLC 67000822.
- Kocsis, Károly (1994). "Contribution to the Background of the Ethnic Conflicts in the Carpathian Basin". GeoJournal. 32 (4). Berlin: Springer Science+Business Media: 425–433. Bibcode:1994GeoJo..32..425K. doi:10.1007/BF00807363. ISSN 0343-2521. JSTOR 41146185.
- Krizman, Bogdan (1970). "The Belgrade Armistice of 13 November 1918". The Slavonic and East European Review. 48 (110). London: UCL School of Slavonic and East European Studies: 67–87. ISSN 0037-6795. JSTOR 4206164.
- Lendvai, Paul (2003). The Hungarians: A Thousand Years of Victory in Defeat. Princeton: Princeton University Press. ISBN 978-0-691-11969-4.
- Lowe, C. J. (1969). "Britain and Italian Intervention, 1914–1915". The Historical Journal. XII (3). Cambridge: Cambridge University Press: 533–548. doi:10.1017/S0018246X00007275. ISSN 0018-246X. JSTOR 2638003. S2CID 162738142.
- Marin, Irina (2013). Contested Frontiers in the Balkans: Ottoman and Habsburg Rivalries in Eastern Europe. London: Bloomsbury Academic. ISBN 978-1-78076-105-3.
- Matijević, Zlatko (2008). "The National Council of Slovenes, Croats and Serbs in Zagreb (1918/1919)". Review of Croatian History. 4 (1). Zagreb: Hrvatski institut za povijest: 51–84. ISSN 1845-4380.
- Merlicco, Giordano (2021). "Between old Austria and new foes: Italy and the Yugoslav project (1917-1918)" (PDF). Istorijski Zapisi. XCIV (1–2). Podgorica: Istorijski institut Crne Gore: 115–138. ISSN 0021-2652. Archived (PDF) from the original on 1 June 2023.
- Milin, Slobodan (31 October 2018). "Veliki Bečkerek u borbi za slobodu 1918. godine" [Veliki Bečkerek in Struggle for Freedom in 1918] (in Serbian). Novi Sad: Radio Television of Vojvodina. Archived from the original on 26 August 2024.
- Miller, Nicholas J. (1998). Between Nation and State: Serbian Politics in Croatia Before the First World War. Pittsburgh: University of Pittsburgh Press. ISBN 978-0-8229-7722-3.
- Nagy, Olivérné, ed. (1977). "Délvidék". Magyar Néprajzi Lexikon. Budapest: Akadémiai Kiadó. ISBN 963-05-1285-8.
- Pavlović, Vojislav G. (2019). "Italy and the Creation of Yugoslavia. Delenda Austria?". In Pavlović, Vojislav G. (ed.). Serbia and Italy in the Great War. Belgrade: Institute for Balkan Studies. pp. 245–278. ISBN 978-86-7179-103-8.
- Radojević, Mira (2020). "The question of Serbian national integration at the time of creation of the Yugoslav state in 1918". War, Peace and Nation-building (1853–1918). Belgrade, Rome: The Institute of History & Sapienza University of Rome, Research center CEMAS. pp. 11–29. ISBN 978-86-7743-140-2.
- Ramet, Sabrina P. (2006). The Three Yugoslavias: State-Building and Legitimation, 1918–2005. Bloomington: Indiana University Press. ISBN 978-0-253-34656-8.
- Robbins, Keith (1971). "British Diplomacy and Bulgaria 1914–1915". The Slavonic and East European Review. 49 (117). London: Modern Humanities Research Association: 560–585. ISSN 0037-6795. JSTOR 4206453.
- Štambuk-Škalić, Marina; Matijević, Zlatko, eds. (2008). "Narodno vijeće Slovenaca, Hrvata i Srba u Zagrebu 1918–1919. (izabrani dokumenti)" [National Council of Slovenes, Croats and Serbs in Zagreb 1918–1919 (Selected Documents)]. Fontes: Izvori Za Hrvatsku Povijest (in Croatian). 14 (1). Zagreb: Croatian State Archives: 71–596. ISSN 1330-6804.
- Unkovski-Korica, Vladimir (2016). "World War II and the National Question: The Origins of the Autonomous Status of Vojvodina in Yugoslavia". Europe-Asia Studies. 68 (10). London: Routledge: 1712–1735. doi:10.1080/09668136.2016.1257700. ISSN 0966-8136. JSTOR 26156925.
- Vagnini, Alessandro (2014). "Drafting the Hungarian-Yugoslav Border: A Short Overview". In Biagini, Antonello; Motta, Giovanna (eds.). Empires and Nations from the Eighteenth to the Twentieth Century: Volume 2. Newcastle upon Tyne: Cambridge Scholars Publishing. pp. 309–318. ISBN 978-1-4438-6017-8.
- Vargha, Gyula, ed. (1912). "1. A népesség főbb adatai községek és népesebb puszták, telepek szerint (1912); II. Részletes kimutatások; 1. A fontosabb demográfiai adatok községenkint; I. Magyarország". 1910. ÉVI; NÉPSZÁMLÁLÁS. Budapest: Central Statistical Office of the Kingdom of Hungary.
- Wasserstein, Bernard; Grenville, John Ashley Soames (2001). The Major International Treaties of the Twentieth Century. Abingdon-on-Thames: Routledge. ISBN 978-0-415-14125-3.
- Živojinović, Dragoljub (2019). "Serbia and the 1915 Treaty of London". In Pavlović, Vojislav G. (ed.). Serbia and Italy in the Great War. Belgrade: Institute for Balkan Studies. pp. 121–136. ISBN 978-86-7179-103-8.
