= Délvidék =

Historical term for areas of Serbia

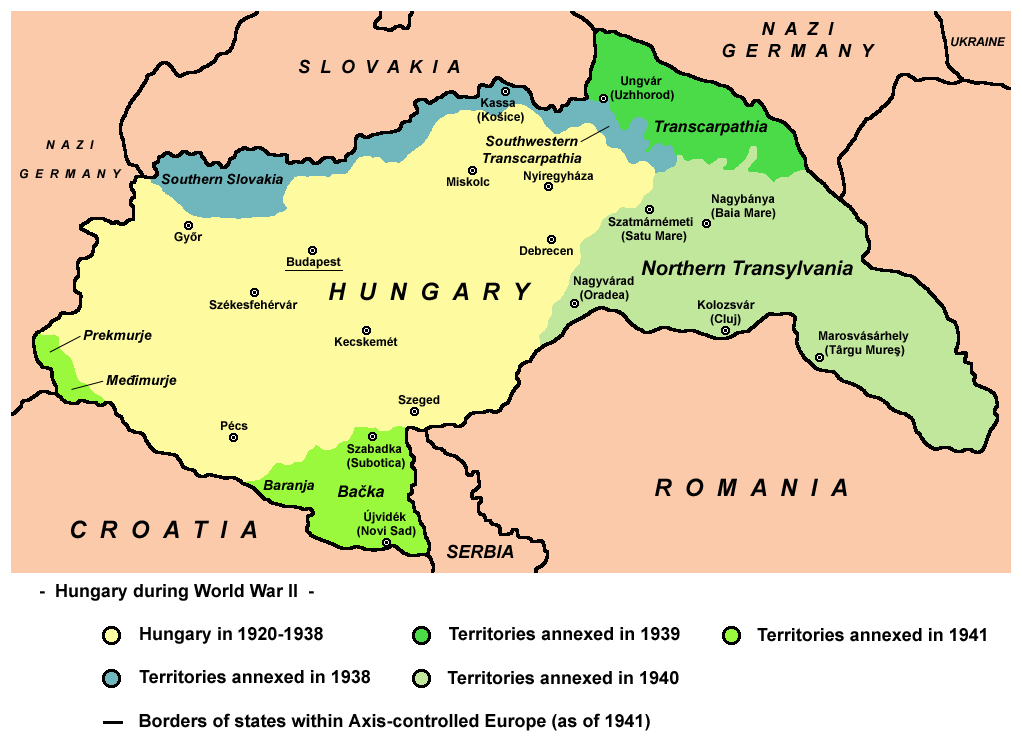
Map of the Kingdom of Hungary in 1941; Délvidék is the green area in the south.

Délvidék (Hungarian: [ˈdeːlvideːk], "southern land" or "southern territories") is a historical geographical term referring to varying areas in the southern part of what was the Kingdom of Hungary. In present-day usage, it often refers to the Vojvodina region of Serbia.

In the Middle Ages, like the names Alvidék ("lower land") and Végvidék ("borderland"), Délvidék referred to the Hungarian counties (Verőce, Pozsega, Szerém, Bács, Torontál, Temes, Keve) and vassal banates (Macsó, Ózora, Só, Szörény) beyond the Danube and the Sava.

By the 18th and 19th centuries, Délvidék referred only to Bácska and Banat. After the 1920 partition of Hungary, the meaning was further narrowed to only those areas of the former Kingdom of Hungary attached to the newly formed Yugoslav state. In the Second World War, the Yugoslav areas occupied by Hungary (Bačka, part of Baranja, Međimurje, and Prekmurje) were in some Hungarian sources called "az anyaországhoz visszatért délvidéki területek" ("the southern territories returned to the motherland"). Banat, divided between Romania and German-occupied Serbia was no longer considered part of the concept.

In contemporary usage, Délvidék has several uses. It can refer to the imprecisely defined area of Serbia's northern Pannonian Basin including Vojvodina, the Belgrade region, and the Mačva plain as well as eastern Croatia (Baranja and western Syrmia). Sometimes the term is used (especially by irredentist) in the narrow sense of Vojvodina, although it has largely been replaced by Vajdaság, the Hungarian name for Vojvodina. "Délvidék Hungarians" (délvidéki magyarok) can refer to Hungarians in Vojvodina or, in a larger sense, to both the Vojvodina Hungarians and Hungarians of Croatia.

== See also ==
- Greater Hungary
- Upper Hungary
