= List of shopping malls in Romania =

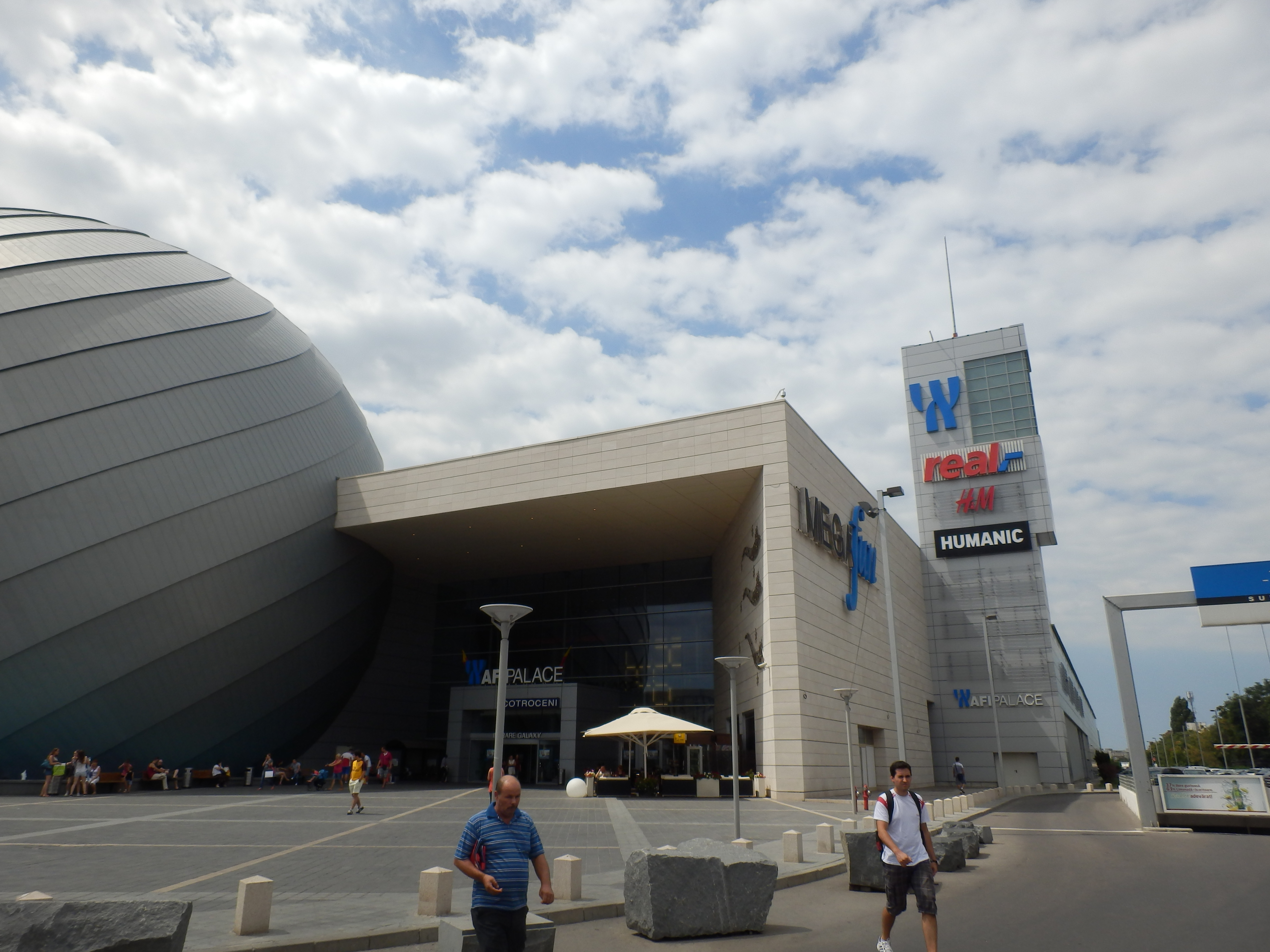
AFI Cotroceni, Bucharest

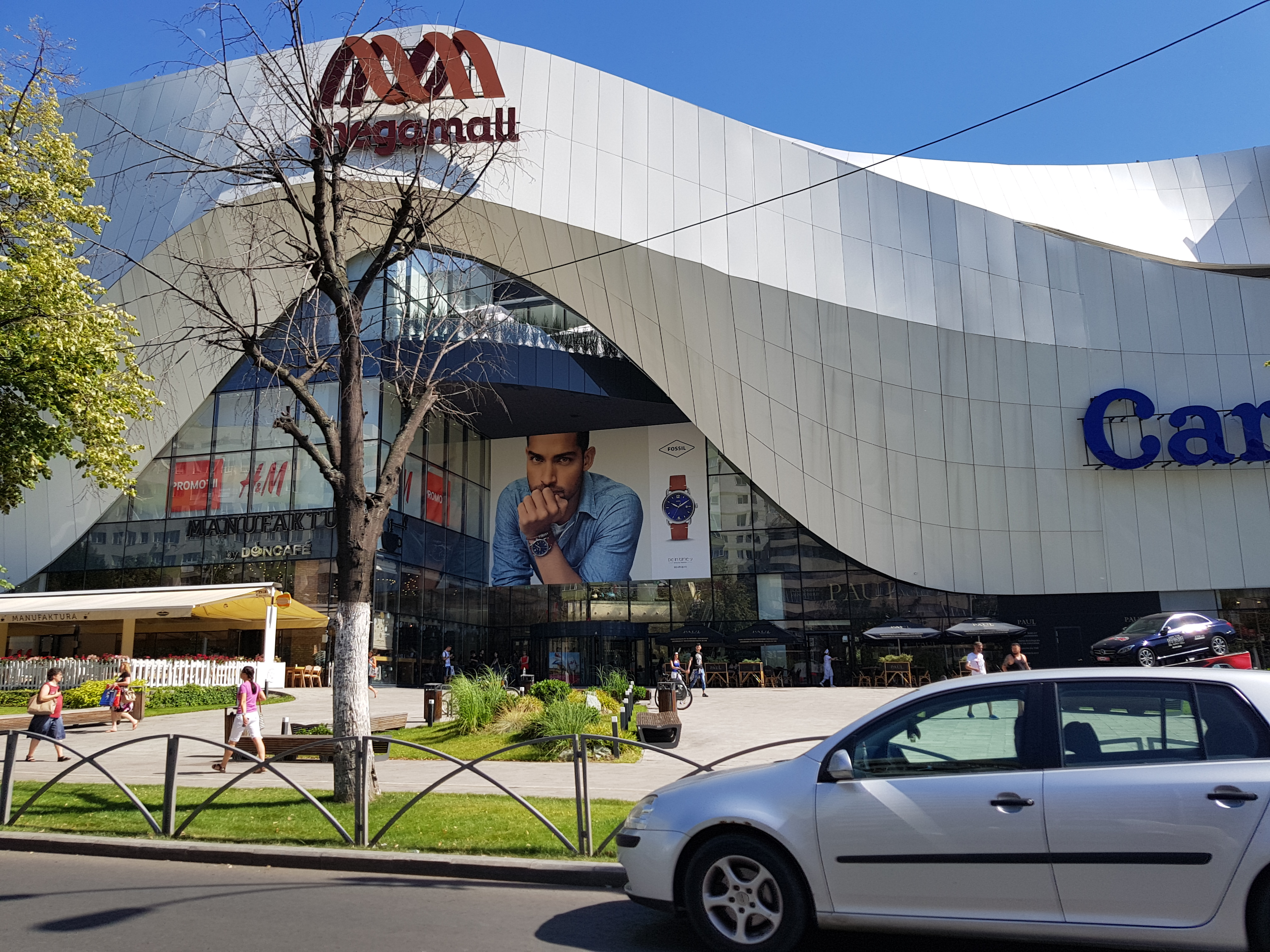
Mega Mall, Bucharest

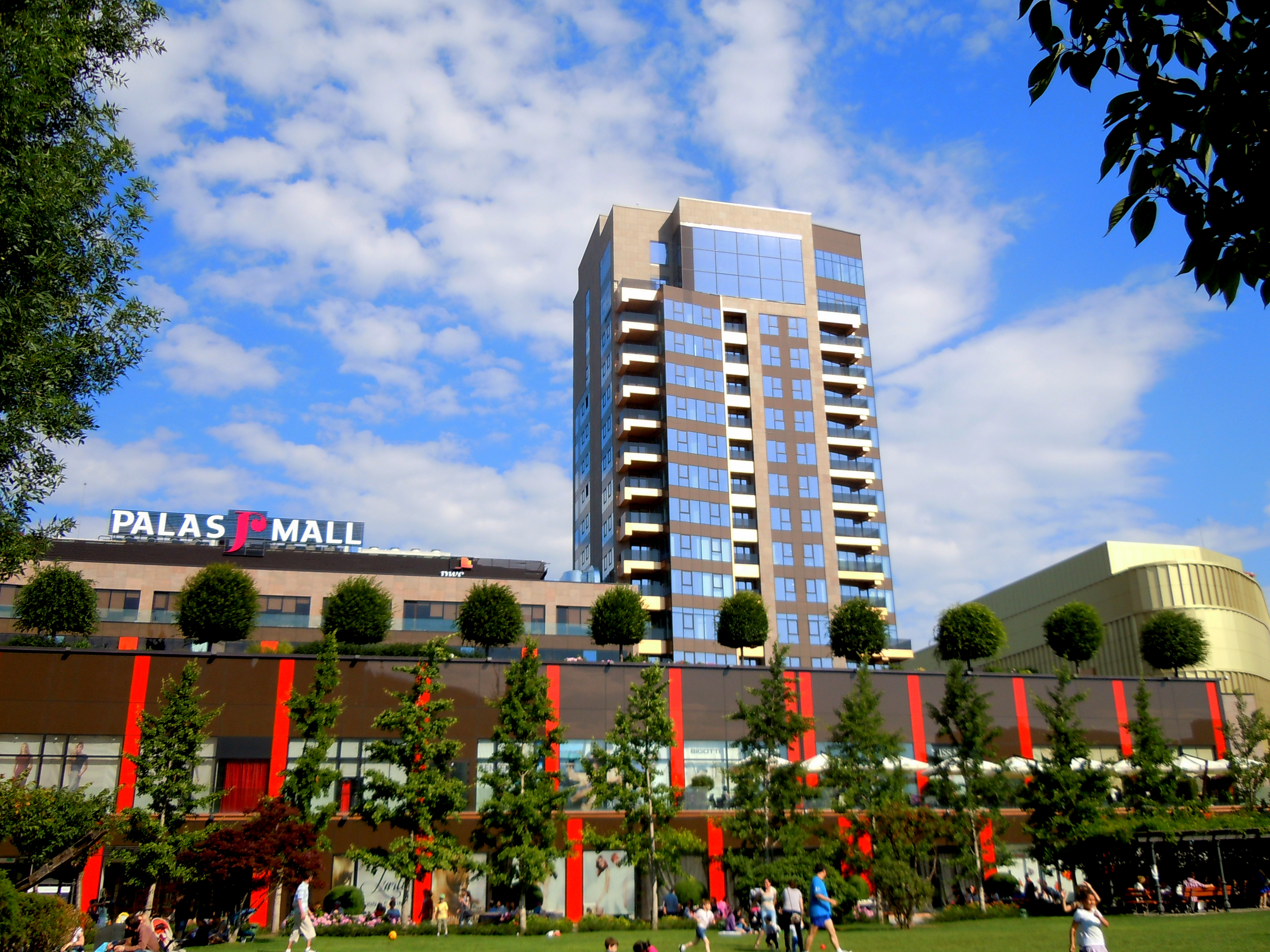
Palas Mall, Iași

This is a list of notable shopping malls, retail parks, and department stores in Romania.

== Bihor County ==
- Lotus Center

== Brăila County ==
- European Retail Park Brăila

== Bucharest ==
- Unirea Shopping Center
- Bucuresti Mall
- Militari Shopping
- Veranda Mall
- Sun Plaza
- Cotroceni Park
- Baneasa Shopping City
- Plaza Romania
- Liberty Center Mall
- ParkLake Shopping Center

== Constanța County ==
- City Park Mall

== Cluj County ==
- Iulius Mall Cluj-Napoca
- VIVO! Cluj-Napoca

== Iași County ==
- Iulius Mall Iași
- Mall Moldova
- Palas Mall

== Prahova County ==
- AFI Ploiesti
- Ploiesti shopping City
- Prahova Value Center

== Timiș County ==
- Iulius Mall Timișoara
- Shopping City Timișoara
- Bega Shopping Center (Timisoara)
