= Economy of Bucharest =

Bucharest is the most economically developed and industrialised city in Romania, producing around 21% of the country's GDP and about one-quarter of its industrial production, while only accounting for 9% of the country's population. Almost one third of national taxes is paid by Bucharest's citizens and companies. In 2009, at purchasing power parity, Bucharest had a per-capita GDP of €26,100, or 111% that of the European Union average and more than twice the Romanian average. The city's strong economic growth has revitalised infrastructure and led to the development of many shopping malls and modern residential towers and high-rise office buildings. In September 2005, Bucharest had an unemployment rate of 2.6%, significantly lower than the national unemployment rate of 5.7%.

Bucharest's economy is mainly centred on industry and services, with services particularly growing in importance in the last ten years. The city serves as the headquarters of 186,000 firms, including nearly all large Romanian companies. An important source for growth since 2000 has been the city's property and construction boom, which has resulted in a significant growth in the construction sector. Bucharest is also Romania's largest centre for information technology and communications and is home to several software companies operating offshore delivery centers. Bucharest contains Romania's largest stock exchange, the Bucharest Stock Exchange, which was merged in December 2005 with the Bucharest-based electronic stock exchange, Rasdaq. The Speedtest Global Index ranks Bucharest the 6th city in the world (after Beijing, Shanghai, Abu Dhabi, Valparaíso, and Lyon) in terms of fixed broadband speed, at 250Mbps in 2023.

The city has a number of international supermarket chains such as Kaufland, Auchan, Mega Image, Carrefour, Cora, and METRO. At the moment, the city is undergoing a retail boom, with a large number of supermarkets, and hypermarkets, constructed every year. For more information, see supermarkets in Romania. The largest shopping centres in Bucharest are AFI Cotroceni, Băneasa Shopping City, Bucharest Mall, Plaza Romania, City Mall, Mega Mall, Park Lake and Unirea Shopping Center. However, there are also a large number of traditional markets; the one at Obor covers about a dozen city blocks, and numerous large stores that are not officially part of the market effectively add up to a market district almost twice that size.

The city has the head offices of Air Bucharest and Blue Air.
