= Iulius Mall =

Iulius Mall is a chain of malls in Romania. It currently operates four malls in four cities:

- Iulius Mall Iaşi
- Iulius Mall Cluj
- Iulius Mall Timișoara
- Iulius Mall Suceava
