= List of tallest buildings in Timișoara =

This article compiles a list of tallest buildings in Timișoara. The list contains both completed and proposed/under construction buildings.

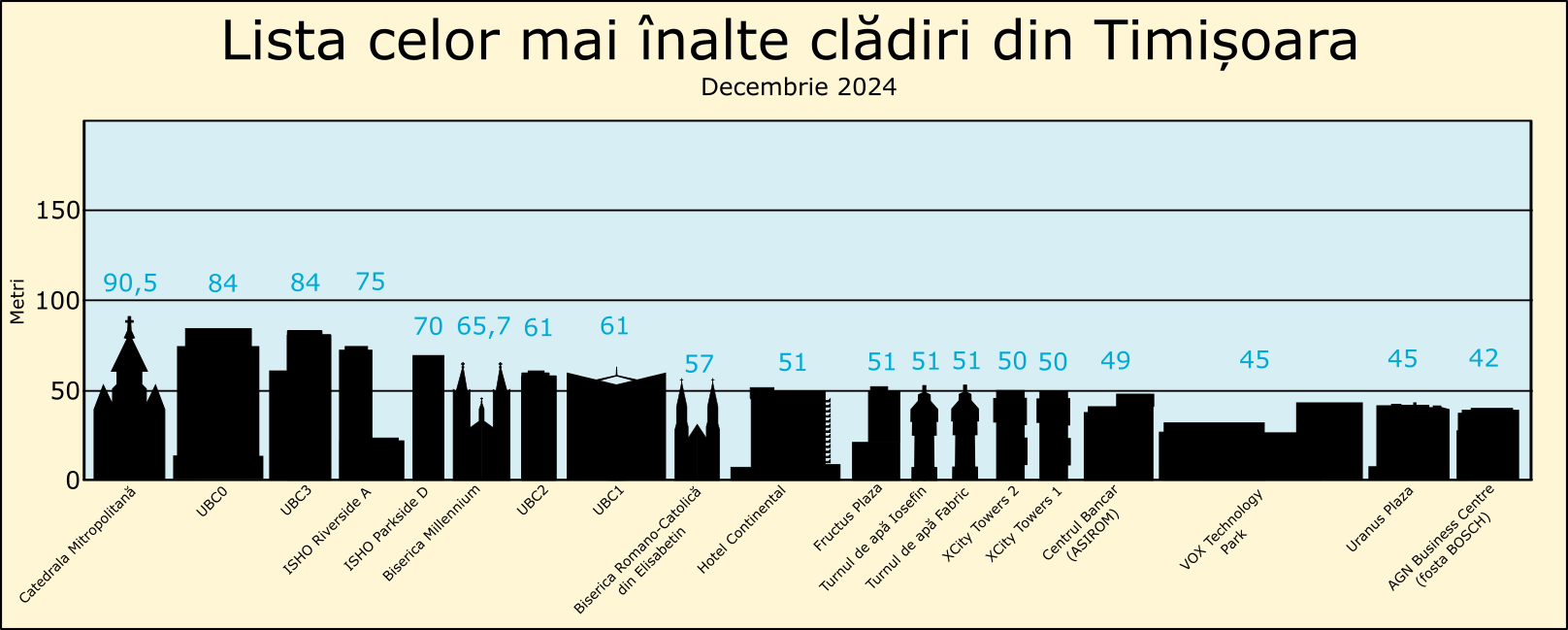
Diagram of the tallest buildings in Timișoara (as of 2024)

== Completed ==
#	Name	Image	Location	Height	Floors	Year	Use	Notes
1	Urseni TV mast		Braytim–Timișoara Sud; 45°43′15″N 21°15′19″E	210 m	–		Communication	
2	Cooling towers of CET Sud		Șagului; 45°42′37″N 21°11′42″E	200 m	–	1986	Unused	
3	Metropolitan Cathedral		Cetate; 45°45′2″N 21°13′27″E	90.5 m	–	1941	Religious	The second tallest church in Romania, after the National Cathedral in Bucharest
4	United Business Center 0		Lipovei; 45°45′54″N 21°13′48″E	84 m	15	2022	Office	Originally intended for a height of 155 m
4	United Business Center 3		Lipovei; 45°45′54″N 21°13′39″E	84 m	14	2019	Office	
6	ISHO Riverside A		Bastion	75 m	20	2021	Residential	
7	ISHO Parkside D		Bastion	70 m	20	2020	Residential	
8	Millennium Church		Fabric; 45°45′24″N 21°14′52″E	65.7 m	–	1901	Religious	
9	Fructus Plaza		Circumvalațiunii; 45°45′34″N 21°13′14″E	65 m	14	2011	Office	
10	United Business Center 1		Lipovei; 45°45′56″N 21°13′35″E	61 m	10	2017	Office	
10	United Business Center 2		Lipovei; 45°45′58″N 21°13′48″E	61 m	10	2017	Office	
12	North Star Continental Resort		Cetate; 45°45′18″N 21°13′56″E	59 m	15	1971	Hotel	
13	Elisabetin Roman Catholic Church		Elisabetin; 45°44′28″N 21°13′35″E	57 m	–	1919	Religious	
14	Fabric Water Tower		Fabric; 45°45′56″N 21°15′3″E	52 m	–	1914	Unused	
14	Iosefin Water Tower		Iosefin; 45°44′43″N 21°12′5″E	52 m	–	1913	Unused	
16	Fabrik		Buziașului	51 m		2024	Residential	
17	Banking Center		Aradului; 45°45′55″N 21°13′28″E	49 m		2004	Office	
18	Uranus Plaza A		Soarelui; 45°44′4″N 21°14′47″E	45 m	12	2015	Residential	
18	Vox Technology Park		Torontalului	45 m	10	2018	Office	
20	Rebreanu Towers		Buziașului	44 m	12	2018	Residential	
21	Institute of Welding and Materials Testing		Elisabetin; 45°44′40″N 21°13′30″E	43 m	11	1974	Office	
22	AGN Business Center		Lipovei; 45°45′48″N 21°13′34″E	42 m	9	2009	Office	
23	New Millennium Reformed Church		Fabric	40 m	–	2019	Religious	
24	Monarch Tower		Bastion	38 m	11	2022	Residential	
24	Vivalia Grand V8		Tipografilor	38 m	11	2024	Residential	
26	BRD Tower		Complexul Studențesc; 45°44′58″N 21°14′16″E		10	1999	Office	
27	ISHO Offices		Bastion	36 m	8	2018	Office	

== Under construction ==
Name	Location	Height	Floors	Construction started	Use	Notes
Park Plaza	Circumvalațiunii	95 m	27	2024	Mixed-use	
Alenia Arena	Circumvalațiunii		15	2024	Residential	
Consorhogar	Buziașului		13	2019	Residential	
Nord One	Circumvalațiunii		12	2018	Residential	
City of Mara	Circumvalațiunii		11	2015	Residential	
Denya Forest	Lipovei		11	2013	Residential	
XCity Towers	Torontalului		11	2018	Residential	
Radisson Blu	Bastion		10	2019	Hotel	Part of the ISHO edge city
Vox Vertical Village	Torontalului		10	2019	Residential	The first vertical village in Romania

== Gallery ==
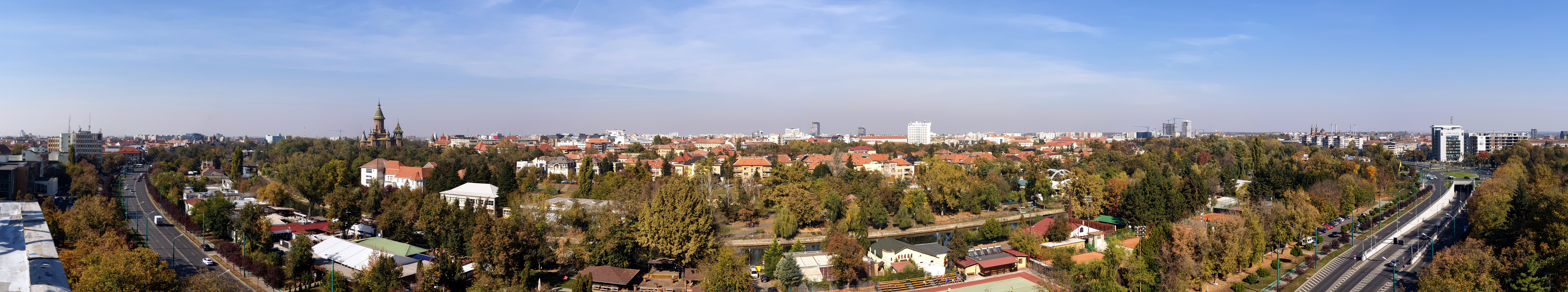
Panorama of Timișoara from the West University
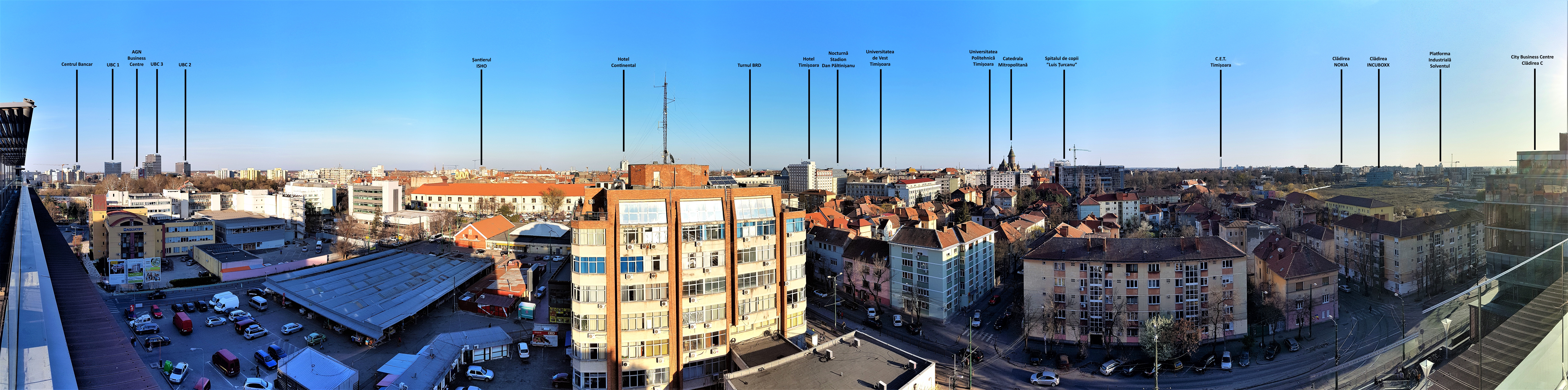
Panorama of Timișoara from AFI Park with notable buildings annotated
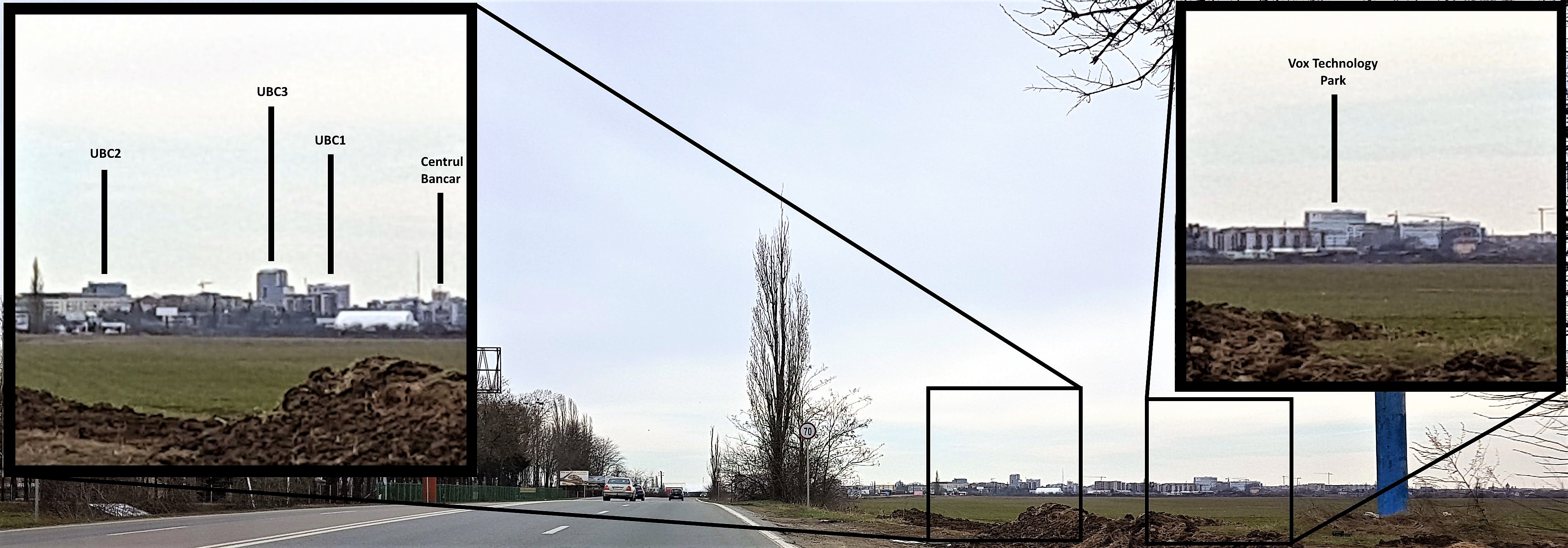
Panorama of Timișoara from Aradului with notable buildings annotated

== See also ==
- List of tallest buildings in Romania
- List of tallest buildings in Bucharest
