= Timișoara Water Museum =

Museum in Timisoara, Romania

Water Museum
- Muzeul Apei
- Established: 9 June 2023
- Location: Timișoara, Romania
- Coordinates: 45°43′25″N 21°15′23″E
- Type: Public
- Architect: László Székely
- Owner: Aquatim SA
- Public transit access: Bus: 24, E2, M22
- Website: www.muzeulapei.ro

The Water Museum (Romanian: Muzeul Apei) is a public museum dedicated to water in Timișoara, Romania. Inaugurated in 2023, it operates in the former water plant on Urseni Way, belonging to the local water and sewerage company, Aquatim SA. Visitors have access to the old waterworks, the fountain group, the filter room, and the pump room. The interior preserves in good condition the equipment used to treat water more than a hundred years ago.

== History ==
=== Urseni Water Plant ===
The first water plant in Timișoara began operating on 1 June 1914, although the treatment facility had already been in use since 26 October 1912. Also in 1914, the Water and Sewerage Enterprise of Timișoara, known as ACOT, was established, representing the first organized form of public utility services in present-day Romania. This plant supplied the city's drinking water until 1991, when a new treatment facility, built adjacent to the original, took over its operations. Initially, water was drawn from 12 boreholes at a depth of 67 meters and transported to the filtration station, where iron and manganese compounds were removed. The treated water was then delivered to consumers via a 87-kilometer-long distribution network. Over the years, the plant underwent modernization and re-engineering, and it currently supplies around 30% of Timișoara's water needs. It is estimated that 70% is water from the Bega Canal.

=== Water Museum ===
The museum was officially inaugurated on 9 June 2023 and opened to the general public on 17 June. In the first six months after its inauguration, the museum was visited by over 20,000 people.

The museum complex occupies a built area of about 2,700 square meters and comprises three historic buildings in the industrial Secession style, once part of the old plant. The development of the project took three years and cost 7.83 million lei, funded by the regional water company Aquatim SA. The design, created by two architects from SDAC Studio, Dan Stoian and Ramona Suciu, focused on making minimal interventions while refunctionalizing the three historic buildings. Additionally, a new pavilion was constructed to house the museum's reception, exhibitions, and events. The outdoor museum area was also designed, featuring a network of pedestrian pathways, designated points of interest, and decorative water basins.

== Material base ==
=== Fountain group ===
The main building was designed by Timișoara's chief architect, László Székely. He collaborated with engineer Stan Vidrighin, who would later become the mayor of Timișoara but was then an employee of the City Hall, in developing the Urseni Water Plant and the Filtration Station—the first of their kind in Romania at the time of their opening in the early 1910s.

Water was extracted through 12 wells, each reaching a depth of 67 meters and equipped with pumps delivering 15 liters per second. Along with two additional well groups in Giroc and Urseni, the system was designed to meet the water demands of Timișoara's 46,000 residents at the time.

It was named the Group of Fountains, but it is also referred to as the UFO, a nickname given in 2010 by a group of enthusiasts fascinated by anomalous phenomena. They began calling it this after spotting its shape on Google Maps.

=== Filter building ===
In this building, water underwent manganese removal after first being filtered for iron. It contains 10 large basins, each equipped with multiple screws—128 in total—that had to be manually opened for cleaning. Filtration began on the second floor in chambers filled with coke, which acted as the filtering material. The thick coke layer was physically removed using shovels, often with the help of prisoners and later workers brought in from Maramureș. Manganese removal, or demanganization, took place behind closed doors in Bollman rapid sand filters located across two levels: the basement and the ground floor.

=== Pump building ===
This building served as the final stop for treated, drinkable water before it left the plant. From here, the water was pumped through 87 kilometers of pipelines running across the city. Unlike today's ring-shaped network, the original distribution system ended at two water towers—known as castles—located in the Fabric and Iosefin neighborhoods. Each tower was constantly monitored by a guard who actually lived on-site. Today, the building houses several multifunctional spaces, including the former pump room, a 28-seat projection room, and an exhibition area.
