= Shopping MallDova =

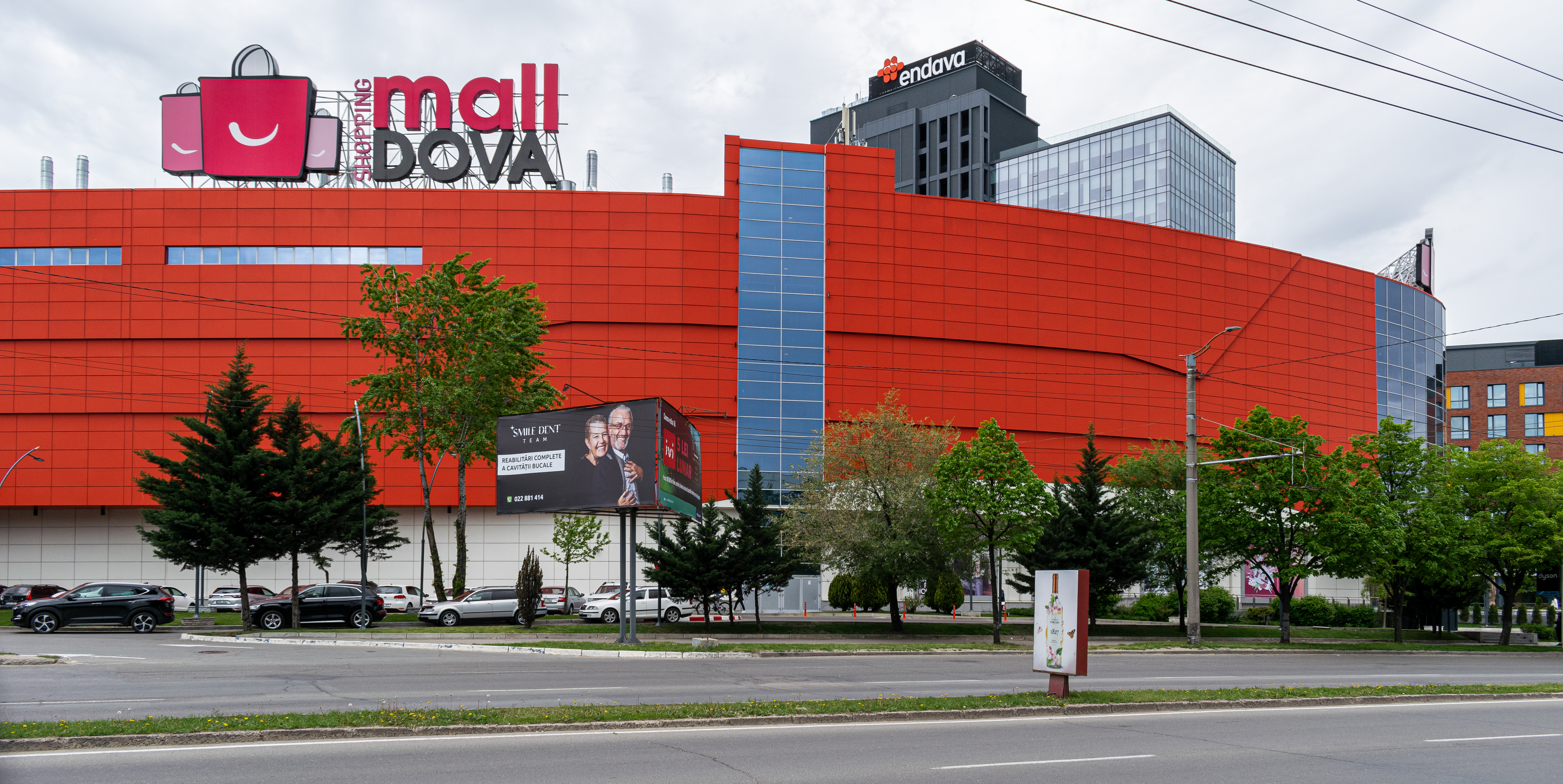
- Location: Chișinău, Moldova
- Coordinates: 47°1′29″N 28°49′57″E
- Opened: 2008
- Owner: Anchor Group / Summa Group
- Num. of stores: 126
- Floor area: 29,000 square metres (312,153.4 sq ft)
- Floors: 4
- Parking: over 1000 underground & deck

Shopping MallDova is a shopping mall in Chișinău, Moldova.

== Overview ==
MallDova is the first large format retail and entertainment commercial center in Moldova. It was opened on November 12, 2008, following an investment of €50 million.

Shopping MallDova is located between Sectorul Botanica and Central Chișinău, on 21 Arborilor str., one of the main arteries of Chișinău. It has 800 parking spaces.

== See also ==
- București Mall
- Plaza Romania
