= Foreign trade of Romania =

International trade
- Exports: US $85.0 billion f.o.b. (2018)
- Imports: US $103.0 billion f.o.b. (2007)
- Current account: ▼US $18.0 billion (2018)
- Export partners: Italy 20.4%, Germany 17%, France 14% (2007)
- Import partners: Italy 23.4%, Germany 16%, France 12% (2007)

Exports of Romania by product category (2019) Chemical products Transportation Machines Mineral products Plastics and rubbers Metals Foodstuffs Precious metals Textiles Instruments Animal products Vegetable products Paper goods Footwear and headwear Miscellaneous Stone and glass Wood products Animal and vegetable bi-products Animal hides Arts and antiques Weapons

In 2012, Romania's largest trading partner was Germany, followed by Italy. Romania's main exports to Germany were insulated wire, cars and vehicle parts, whereas its main German imports are cars and vehicle parts. The principal Italian imports to Romania include hides, footwear parts, medicaments, telephones and vehicle parts. Romania's chief exports to Italy included leather footwear, cars, telephones, tobacco, men's suits, seats and iron pipes.

2.8% of the country's GDP is derived from agricultural activity. While Romania imports substantial quantities of grain, it is largely self-sufficient in other agricultural products and food stuffs. Food must be regulated for sale in the retail market, therefore Romania imports almost no food products from other countries. In 2006 Romania imported food products worth €2.4 billion, up almost 20% versus 2005, when imports were worth slightly more than €2 billion. The EU is Romania's main trade partner in agri-food products. Romanian EU exports represent 64%, and imports from EU countries represent 54%. Other important partners are the CEFTA countries, Turkey, Republic of Moldova and the USA.

Romania is an important exporter of military equipment, accounting for 3-4% of the world total in 2007. EU members are represented by a single official at the World Trade Organization.

== Foreign direct investment ==
Foreign direct investment (FDI) in Romania has increased dramatically. Romania receives the second highest FDI in Central Europe. Foreign direct investment flow attracted by Romania in the first two months of 2008 reached €1.2 million, thus registering a 40% increase against January and February 2007. Considering the FDI structure, the predominant investment were other capitals (loans granted by parent companies to affiliate structures in Romania) representing 50.8% out of the total for January and February 2008, followed by reinvested profit and capital participation amounting to 49.2%.

In 2006, net FDI was US$12 billion (€9.1 billion). Skilled labor force, low taxes, a 16% flat tax for corporations and individuals, no dividend taxes, liberal labor code and a favorable geographical location are Romania's main advantages for foreign investors. FDI has grown by 600% since 2000 to around $13.6 billion or $2,540 per capita by the end of 2004. In October 2005, new investment stimuli introduced more favorable conditions to IT and research centers, especially those located in eastern Romania (where unemployment is higher), planning to bring more added value without logistical demands.

The origin countries of FDI in Romania during 1996-2005 were split as follows:– the Netherlands 24.3%; Germany 19.4%, Austria 14.1%; Italy 7.5%. Top investors from countries, by companies: Erste Bank (Austria), OMV (Austria), Gaz de France (France), Orange (France), Vodafone (United Kingdom), Ford (United States), MOL (Hungary), ENEL (Italy), E.ON (Germany), Nokia (Finland). General Motors is considering building production centre in Romania, with Cluj-Napoca as a potential location, close to the Nokia Village where Nokia invested US$100 million in a plant. SABMiller is set to invest €50m (US$69m) in expanding production at one of its breweries in Romania (Ursus (beer)). Czech based investor and developer CTP Invest plans to allocate €60 million next year in industrial property development in Romania. Snowmobile and motorcycle maker Polaris Industries will invest €50 million (US$69.41 million) in a snowmobile plant in Romania. British investments in the Romanian economy currently exceed €5 billion, with more than 3,200 British companies operating in key sectors, including telecommunications, information technology, financial services, and water and environmental protection.

The sectors of FDI in Romania are split as follows: industry 38.4%; banking and insurance 22.2%; wholesale and retail trade 13.1%; production of electricity, gas and water 10.5%; transportation and telecommunications 9.2%. Foreign capital is attracted by skilled and relatively inexpensive labor, tax incentives, modern infrastructure, and a good telecommunications system. Romania has strength in information technology and other significant areas such as auto components, chemicals, apparels, pharmaceuticals and jewelry.

The European Union provides €143 million in aid to Ford Motor Company plants in Romania. The aid is part of a total investment of €600 million (US$934 million) in the plants to make engines and complete vehicles in the Craiova region of southwest Romania.

In 2008, Procter & Gamble intended to allocate €50 million for construction of a cosmetics factory in Romania. This would be the first greenfield site for the cosmetics industry in Romania. Peugeot is interested in opening an engine factory in Romania, representing an investment of €600 million.

== Romanian investments abroad ==
The Romanian furniture company Mobexpert opened its first hypermarket in Sofia, Bulgaria, within the residential district of Lyulin. €10 million was invested, of which 80 per cent was provided as bank credit from Alpha Bank. Employing 4500 people, Mobexpert's hypermarkets had an annual profit of €200 million. Considered to be the largest Romanian electronics retailer, Altex, planned to enter the Bulgarian market in 2008. Altex has 90 stores in Romania's largest cities, with ten stores in Bucharest. The company previously announced its plans to enter the Serbian market. Romanian sanitary and electric equipment distributor Romstal has entered the Serbian market, acquiring local equipment distributor Doming for €10 million ($14.7 million).

== Romanian-Moldovan economic relations ==
EU membership gives Romania new economic opportunities in its trade relationship with Moldova. Romania is currently the second largest export market for Moldova, accounting for a 15.7% market share in 2007. Moldovan exports are dominated by oils, iron rods, barrels and sunflower seeds. In January–February 2007, Moldova imported mostly garnishes, breeches and similar goods, 196.9 times more than the same period for 2006, as well as petroleum oils and oils made of bituminous materials. Simultaneously, the value of Moldovan imports from Romania increased to US$101.6 million, representing 2.1 times or $52.1 million compared with the first two months of 2006.
