= Uroš Đaković =

Serbian entrepreneur (born 1997)

Uroš Đaković (born 1997 in Belgrade, Serbia) is a Serbian entrepreneur and investor in the construction industry and real estate sector focused on the development and construction of residential buildings. He is the founder and director of several companies operating in the construction and real estate sectors. After acquiring his initial professional experience, he continued his career as an entrepreneur, founding several companies in the field of real estate and the construction industry. Among them are Block Properties, a company focused on the development and construction of residential buildings, and Beohost, which deals with the professional management and maintenance of residential buildings. He is the founder of the Belgrade-based company Beohost and serves as the regional director for South-East Europe at the Czech software company Realpad.

Through the further development of his business, Đaković expanded his activities to multiple segments of the real estate market, including investment development, construction, and project management, forming an integrated approach within several affiliated companies.

== Education ==
Đaković was born in 1997 in Belgrade. He graduated from the Faculty of Economics, University of Belgrade.

== Career ==
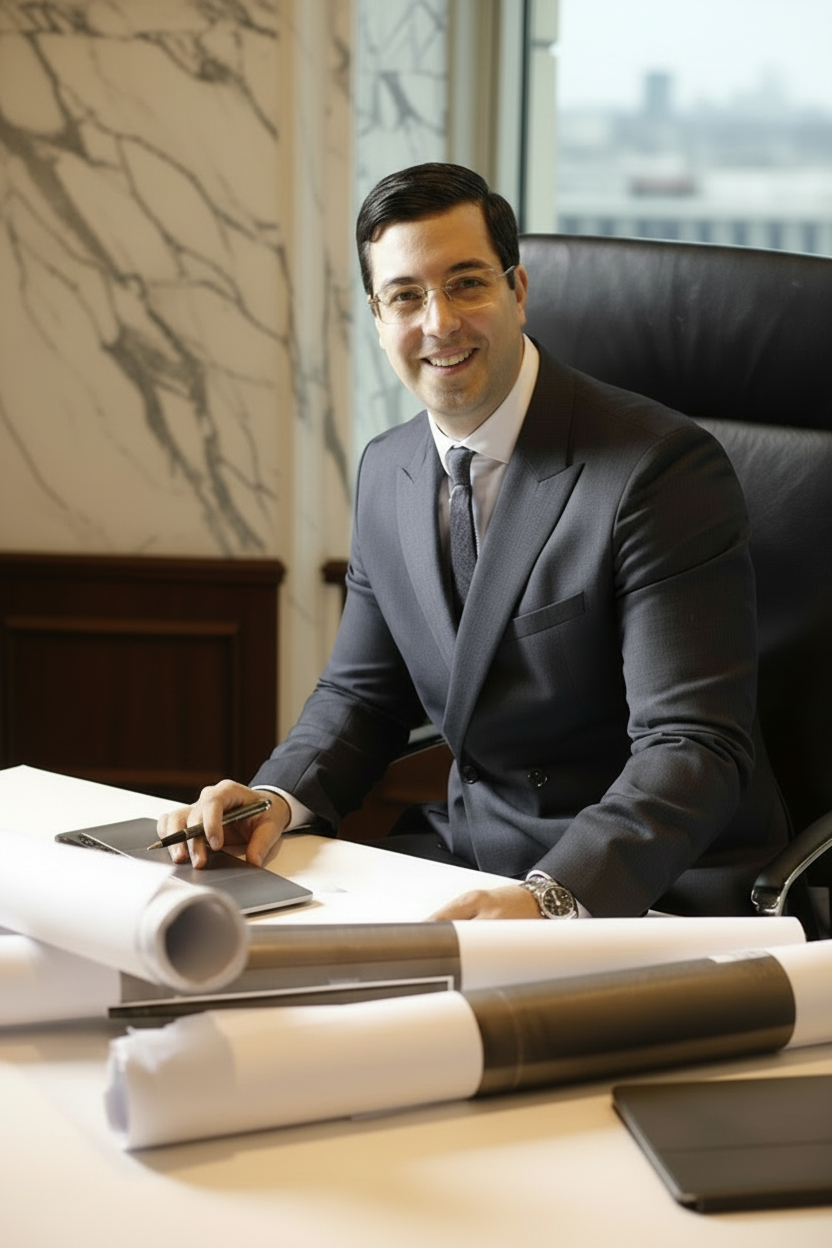
Uros Djakovic Serbian entrepreneur active in the property technology

=== Delta Holding ===
Đaković began his professional career at Delta Holding, where he was selected as one of 46 participants of the eighth generation of the corporate program "Mladi lideri" (Young Leaders) in 2018, out of more than 3,000 applicants.

=== Beohost ===
In 2018, while still working at Delta Holding, Đaković founded the startup Beohost, which initially operated as a service for short-term rental management of apartments in Belgrade. The company subsequently took part in the Delta Business Incubator program, organized by Delta Holding. Beohost later expanded into property management of residential and commercial buildings and the development of related software solutions. According to data published in 2022, the company maintained more than 60 residential and 13 commercial buildings in Belgrade.

=== CQC Software ===
Đaković is also a co-founder of the software company CQC Software (also referred to as Conssoft), focused on the digitalization of the construction industry.

=== Realpad ===
Since 2022, Đaković has served as regional director for South-East Europe at Realpad, a Czech software company providing customer relationship management (CRM) solutions for real estate developers. In this role, he has overseen the introduction of the Realpad platform on the Serbian market, where it has been adopted by developer companies including AFI Europe, SEBRE and Urban Developers. According to public statements made in trade media, Realpad has more than 100 clients across Europe.

== Public engagement ==
Đaković has appeared as a speaker at the REBEC (Real Estate Belgrade Exhibition & Conference) in 2022.

== Recognition ==
In 2022, Đaković was included on the "30 under 30" list of young business leaders published by the Serbian business magazine BIZLife.
