= European Retail Park Brăila =

Commercial complex in Vărsătura, Romania

Coordinates: 45.23059°N 27.93849°E

European Retail Park Brăila (ERP Brăila) is a commercial complex in Romania. It was developed by the Belgian company BelRom with an investment fund of 60 million euros and was inaugurated in May 2008. In September 2009 it was acquired by NEPI Rockcastle through a transaction of 63 million euros. It has a surface of 60,000 square metres (650,000 square feet) and is located in the village of Vărsătura close to the city of Brăila.

The commercial complex is projected to serve to one million people throughout six nearby counties, more precisely the Brăila, Buzău, Galați, Ialomița, Tulcea and Vrancea counties. The complex is composed by stores of Altex, Bricostore, Carrefour and, most notably, by the Promenada Mall Brăila. The main tenants of the latter include Deichmann SE, KFC, New Yorker and many others.
