= Iulius Town Timișoara =

Romanian shopping mall

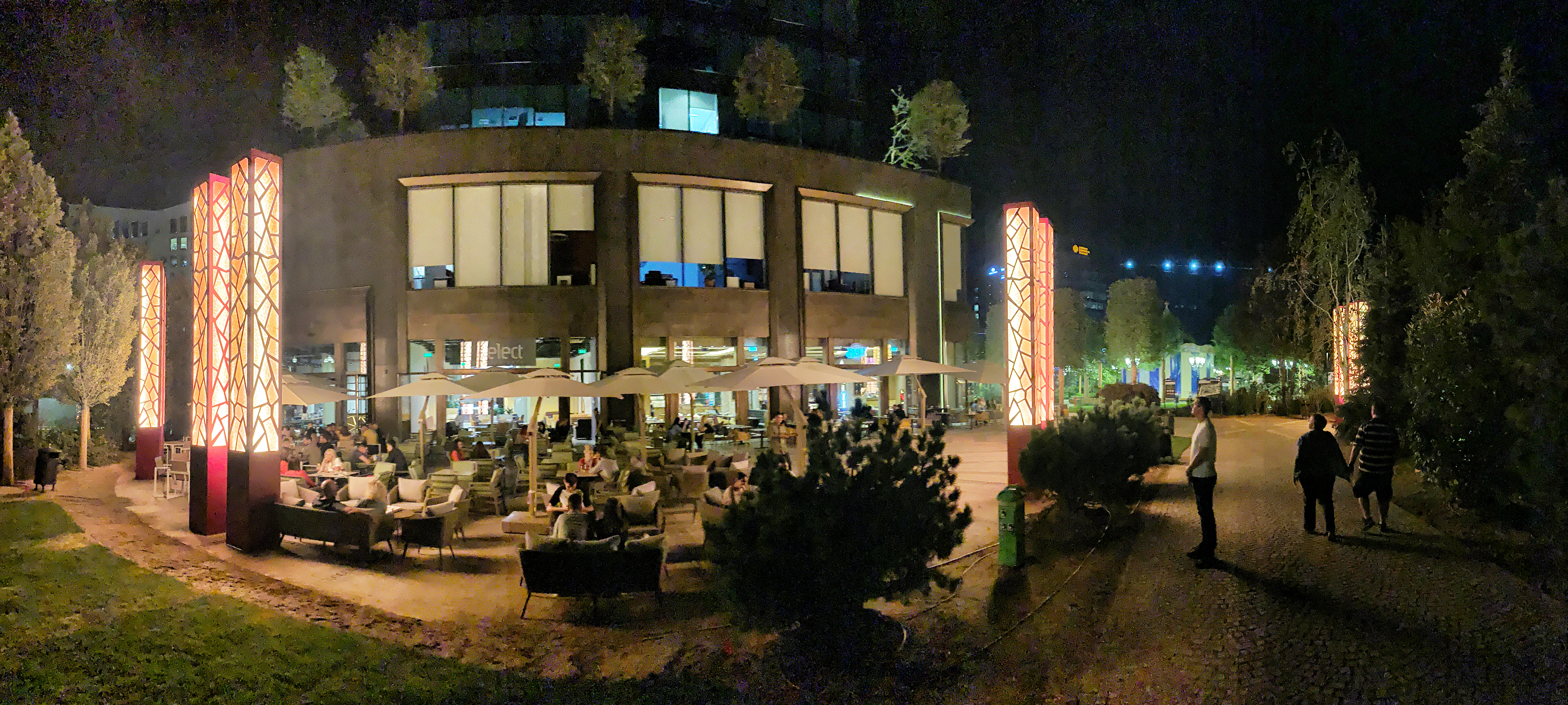
- Iulius Town Timișoara at night
- Location: Timișoara, Romania
- Coordinates: 45.7664°N 21.2281°E
- Address: 2 Council of Europe Square
- Opened: 20 October 2005
- Previous names: Openville Timișoara (2015–2019)
- Owner: Iulius Group–Atterbury Europe
- Num. of stores: 450
- Floor area: 102,000 m^{2} (1,100,000 sq ft)
- Floors: 5
- Parking: 4,070
- Website: iuliustown.ro

Iulius Town Timișoara (until 2019 Openville Timișoara) is the name of a mixed-use development, edge city and shopping mall located in Timișoara, Romania. Owned by the Iulius Group–Atterbury Europe consortium, the project was conceived from the beginning to integrate Iulius Mall, now completed with office, retail and entertainment functions. The mixed project includes, in addition to the shopping area, a park, event rooms, offices, a health center, a cinema and 4,070 parking spaces. Over 442 million euros were invested in the first phase of the project, partially inaugurated in August 2019, being one of the largest infusions of private capital in the real estate sector ever made in Romania. The estimated annual traffic for Iulius Town is over 20 million visitors.

== Iulius Mall ==
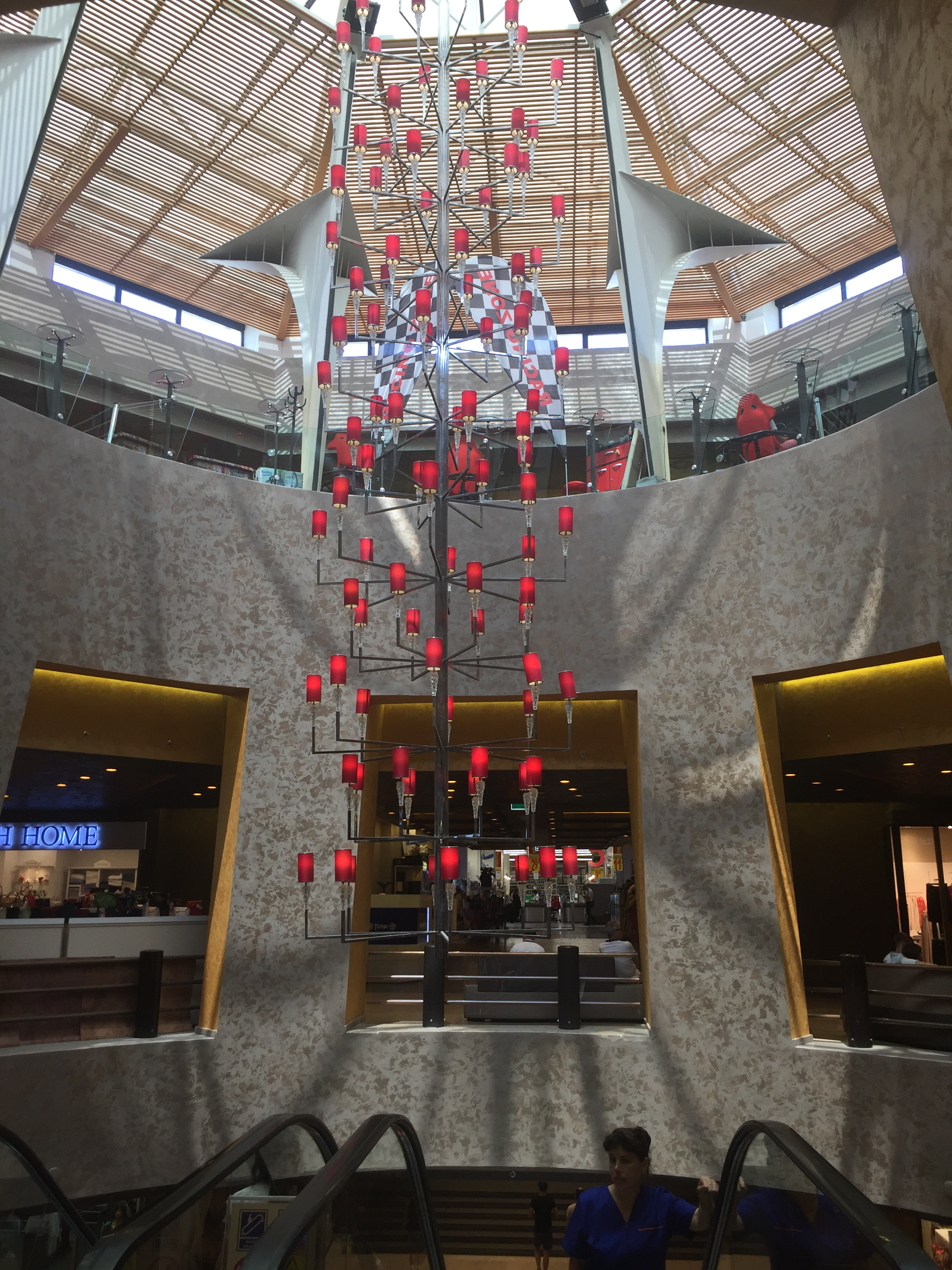
Interior of Iulius Mall

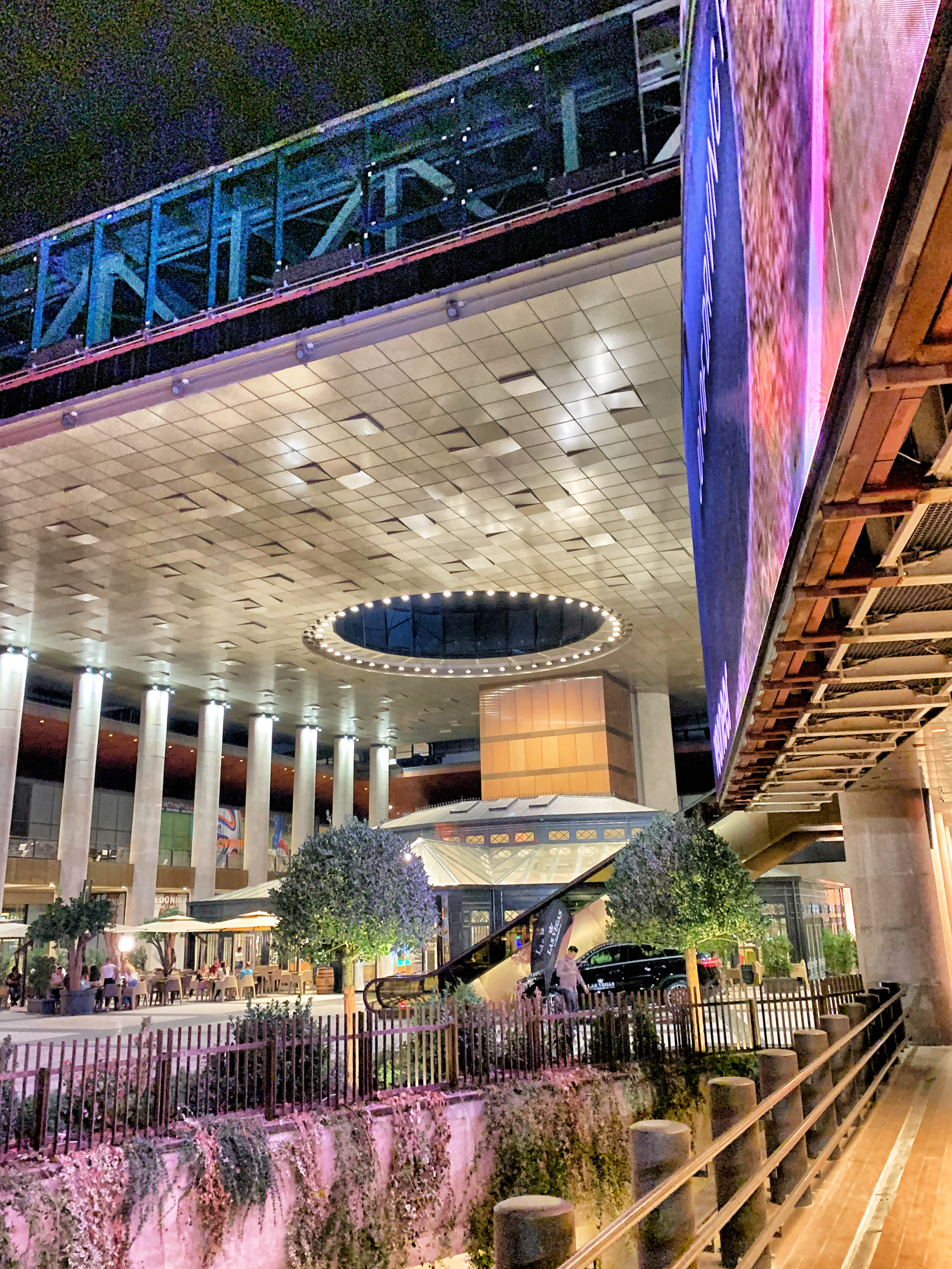
Main entrance of Iulius Mall

Iulius Mall Timișoara, the second mall within the Iulius national network, was inaugurated on 20 October 2005, following an initial investment of approximately 45 million euros. It was developed on a site that hosted antennas mounted in the 1940s and that remained undervalued in the early 2000s. Iulius Group was founded in 1991 by Iulian Dascălu, and the company currently owns three other malls in Iași, Suceava and Cluj-Napoca. At the time of its inauguration, Iulius Mall Timișoara was the first mall in western Romania.

In 2005, Iulius Mall Timișoara had a gross leasable area of 31,000 m^{2}, which was then expanded to 73,000 m^{2} in 2009, and 102,000 m^{2} in 2019. The mall has: 4,070 parking spaces, 450 stores, including a 11,500-square-meter Auchan hypermarket, a 12-screen Cinema City cinema, a 2,500-seat food court, full-service restaurants, bars and cafés, a semi-Olympic swimming pool and largest fitness club in Romania (over 3,400 m^{2}), a climbing wall and ice rink (during the winter season), a bowling and billiard hall, a casino, indoor playgrounds and play areas, banks, police offices (vehicle registration and passport services) and a post office.

At the time of the last extension, it was the largest mall outside Bucharest and the third largest in Romania, after AFI Cotroceni and Băneasa Shopping City. As of 2024, the mall generated €42.4 million in turnover, placing it third nationwide.

== Iulius Gardens ==
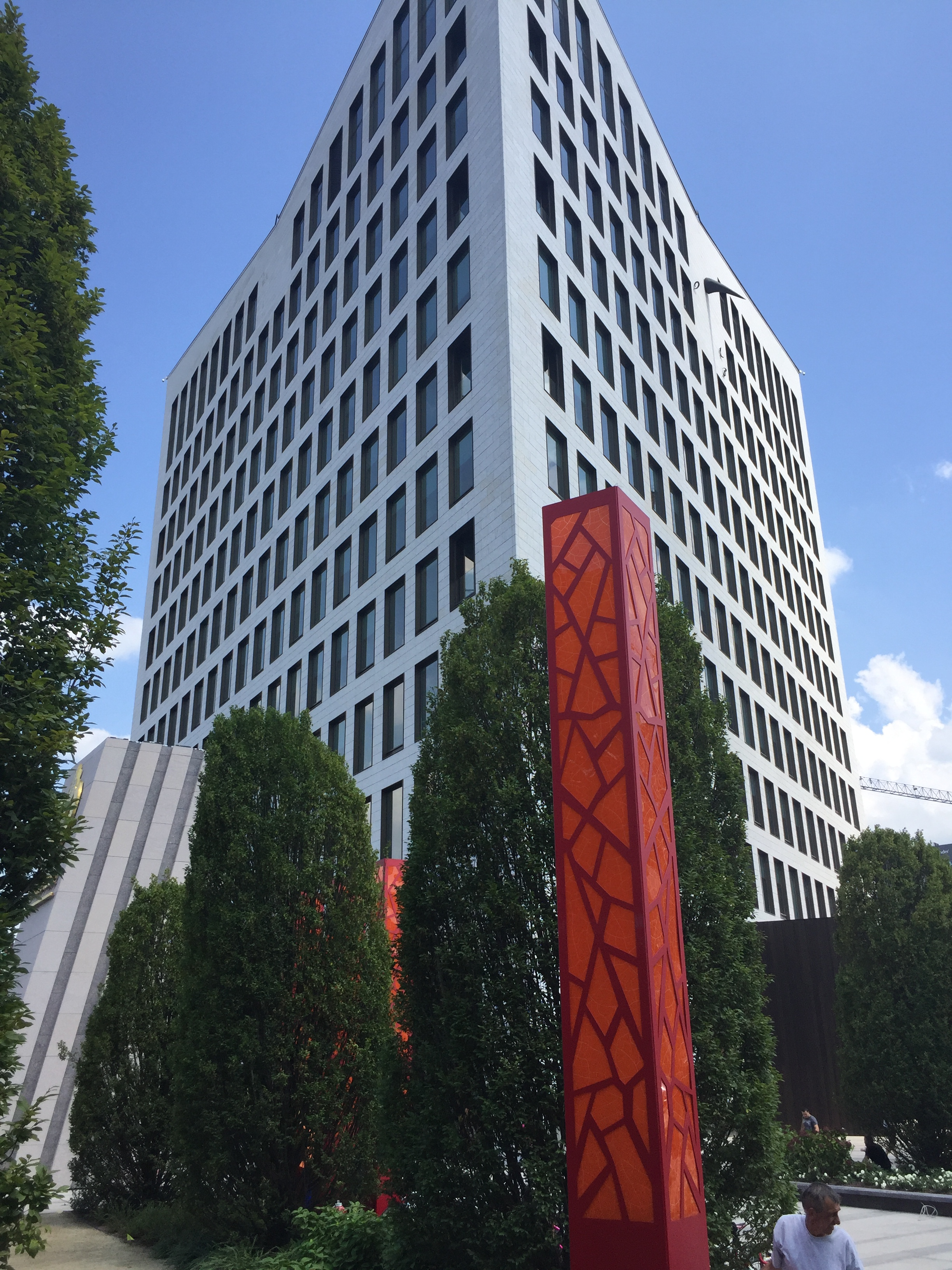
UBC 1

Iulius Gardens have an area of 5.5 ha, being the largest suspended park in Romania. The park involved an investment of 8.7 million euros and was carried out by a team of specialists from Italy, Germany and Romania. Arranged above the underground car park in the complex, the green space integrates 10,000 shrubs and 1,400 large trees. Iulius Gardens also include an 800-square-meter lake, a multi-storey Venetian carousel for children, a gazebo, promenades and plazas for outdoor events and fairs.

== United Business Center ==
Iulius Town includes in the first stage of development over 100,000 m^{2} of Class A office space in four buildings, employing about 13,000 people. All four buildings are operational as of 2022, with tenants including multinational IT, automotive and customer support companies. United Business Center 2 is the first office building that was commissioned within the Iulius Town complex, opened in early 2017. The last one to be inaugurated and the tallest of them, having 15 floors and two technical floors, is United Business Center 0.

Current status of construction
Completed	Topped out	Under construction	On hold	Presumably

Name	Started	Completed	Height	Floors	Gross leasable area	Notes
United Business Center 0	2017	2022	70 m	15	30,000 m^{2}	It was lowered (original plans were to build a 155-meter-high tower).
United Business Center 1	2016	2017	52 m	12	13,000 m^{2}	
United Business Center 2		2017	54 m	12	18,000 m^{2}	It is the first office building put into use in the Iulius Town Timișoara.
United Business Center 3	2017	2019	68 m	15	19,000 m^{2}	
United Business Center 4			60 m	10		
United Business Center 5			60 m	10		

== See also ==
- List of tallest buildings in Timișoara
- Palas Iași
- Iulius Mall Cluj
- Iulius Mall Iași
- Iulius Mall Suceava
