= Chiscani =

- Commune
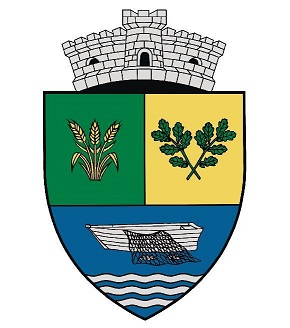
- Coat of arms

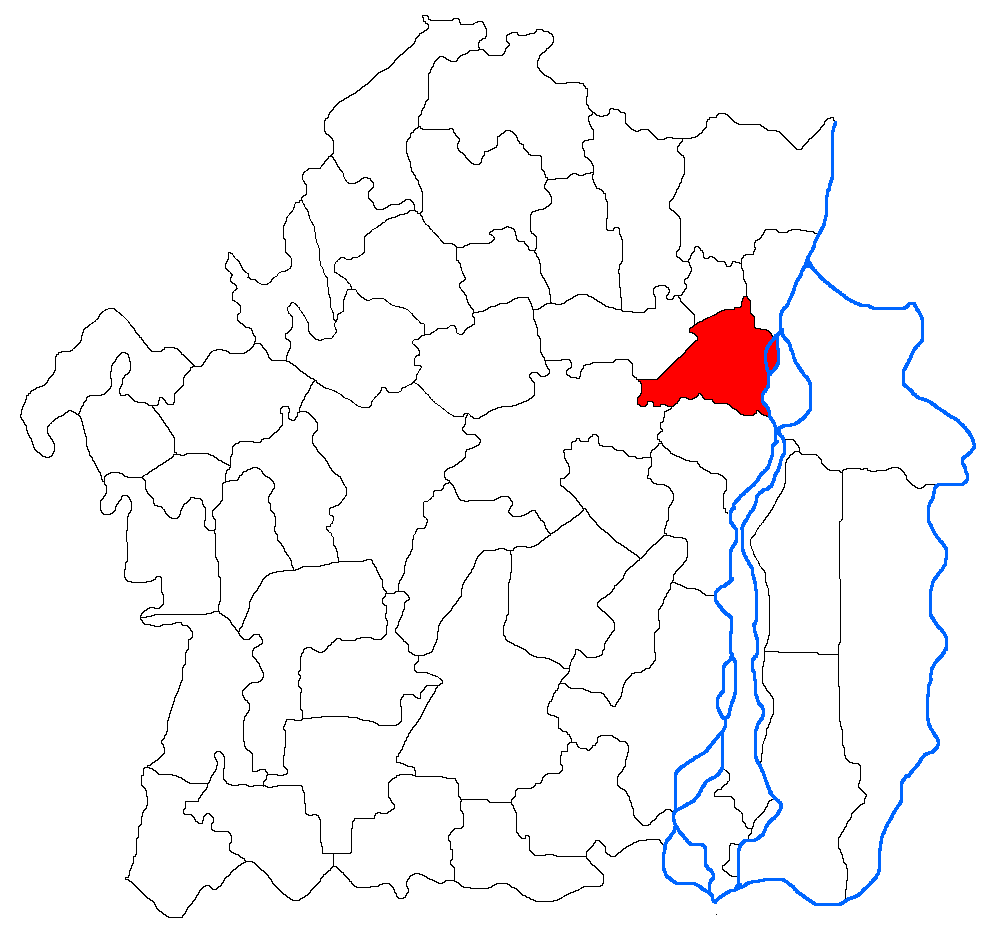
- Location in Brăila County

- Location in Romania
- Coordinates: 45°11′N 27°56′E
- Country: Romania
- County: Brăila

Government
  - Mayor (2020–2024): Busuioc Costică Cojea (PSD)
- Area: 299.4 km^{2} (115.6 sq mi)
- Population (2021-12-01): 6,151
  - Density: 20.54/km^{2} (53.21/sq mi)
- Time zone: UTC+02:00 (EET)
  - Summer (DST): UTC+03:00 (EEST)
- Postal code: 817025
- Vehicle reg.: BR
- Website: primariachiscani.ro

Chiscani is a commune located in the northeastern part of Brăila County, Muntenia, Romania. It is composed of three villages: Chiscani, Lacu Sărat, and Vărsătura.

The commune is located on the left bank of the Danube, just south of the county seat, Brăila.

The Balta Mică a Brăilei Natural Park is partly situated on the administrative territory of the commune. The European Retail Park Brăila is also located in the territory of the commune, more precisely within the village of Vărsătura.
