= Târca–Vitan Church =

Heritage site in Bucharest, Romania

Coordinates: 44°24′49″N 26°07′59″E

Târca–Vitan Church (Romanian: Biserica Târca–Vitan) is a Romanian Orthodox church located at 142 Calea Vitan in Bucharest, Romania. It is dedicated to the Feast of the Ascension, to Saint John the Evangelist and to Saints Menas and Charalambos.

== History ==
The church is situated near the left bank of the Dâmbovița River, once a swampy area grazed by cattle. The name of Târca, dating to around 1670, refers either to tărcat, piebald; or to țarc, pen. Vitan is linked to vite, cattle. The church was completed before July 1820, the date of the first pisanie, written in Romanian Cyrillic and placed on the western facade. Serdar Radu Poenaru and his wife Natalia were the ktetors; it was the first church on the site. (Ioan C. Filitti holds that Târca was a nickname in Poenaru’s family tree.)

After their death, the church and adjacent estate passed to an heiress, who eventually sold them. The neglected church came to lie in ruins; it was closed in 1912, and the owners were set on demolition. In 1914, following a public collection of funds and a donation from the Metropolis of Ungro-Wallachia, the church was repaired, given a mosaic floor and painted; it reopened in 1915. The masonry iconostasis retains its original painting, which was repaired in 1924. A new pisanie dates to 1925. Several further restorations of the painting occurred in the latter half of the 20th century.

== Description ==
The church has a cross-shaped plan, 23 meters long by 6–9 meters wide, with thick brick walls and apses in slight relief. A smaller enclosed portico was added later, next to which there is a room for lighting candles. The narthex and first part of the nave have a cylindrical vault. The bell tower sits on the narthex; only the large stone base remains, protected by tin sheeting. There is a depressed dome above the center of the nave, resting on pendentives. The facades are divided into two unequal sections by a simple string course. The two feature panels of varying dimensions; these are rectangular, with rounded corners. The upper part of the western facade has icons of the patron saints painted in three rectangular frames. The roof, built of tin between 1885 and 1915 and at present, was temporarily replaced by Turkish tiles in 1940.

The belfry at the entrance was restored in 1942. The base level was once enclosed by massive doors facing the exterior. The corners of the upper level are rounded off by column sections and narrow windows. The four-sided roof is covered in tiles. A metal-framed structure to the northwest of the church is now used for bell ringing. A badly deteriorated row of cell-houses built by the ktetor for himself and for journeying monks is located to the west, separated by a fence. A cemetery, closed in 1880, once surrounded the church; a stone cross from 1877 remains.

The church is listed as a historic monument by Romania's Ministry of Culture and Religious Affairs.
