= AFI Ploiești =

- Location: Ploiești, Romania
- Coordinates: 50°1′9.83″N 19°48′7.75″E
- Address: Gheorghe Doja Street
- Opened: October 2013; 13 years ago
- Owner: AFI Europe
- Floor area: 34,000 sqm
- Floors: 2
- Parking: 1000
- Public transit: AFI Palace Bus Stop: Buses 40 * 401 * 402
- Website: www.en.afi-ploiesti.ro

AFI Ploiești is a shopping mall located in the city center of Ploiești, Romania, which was opened in October 2013, following an investment of over EUR 50 million.

== Location ==
The shopping mall is located 850 meters from the City Center, on Gheorghe Doja Street, along the main access road from the North-East, a position that transforms the shopping mall into the main commercial destination within the City Center.

== Facilities ==
The mix of tenants includes over 100 national and international fashion brands. The mall includes entertainment and leisure area of over 7,000 sqmand 1,000 parking spaces.
