= Vitan, Bucharest =

Neighborhood in Bucharest

Coordinates: 44°24′37.99″N 26°8′13.52″E

Vitan on the map of Bucharest

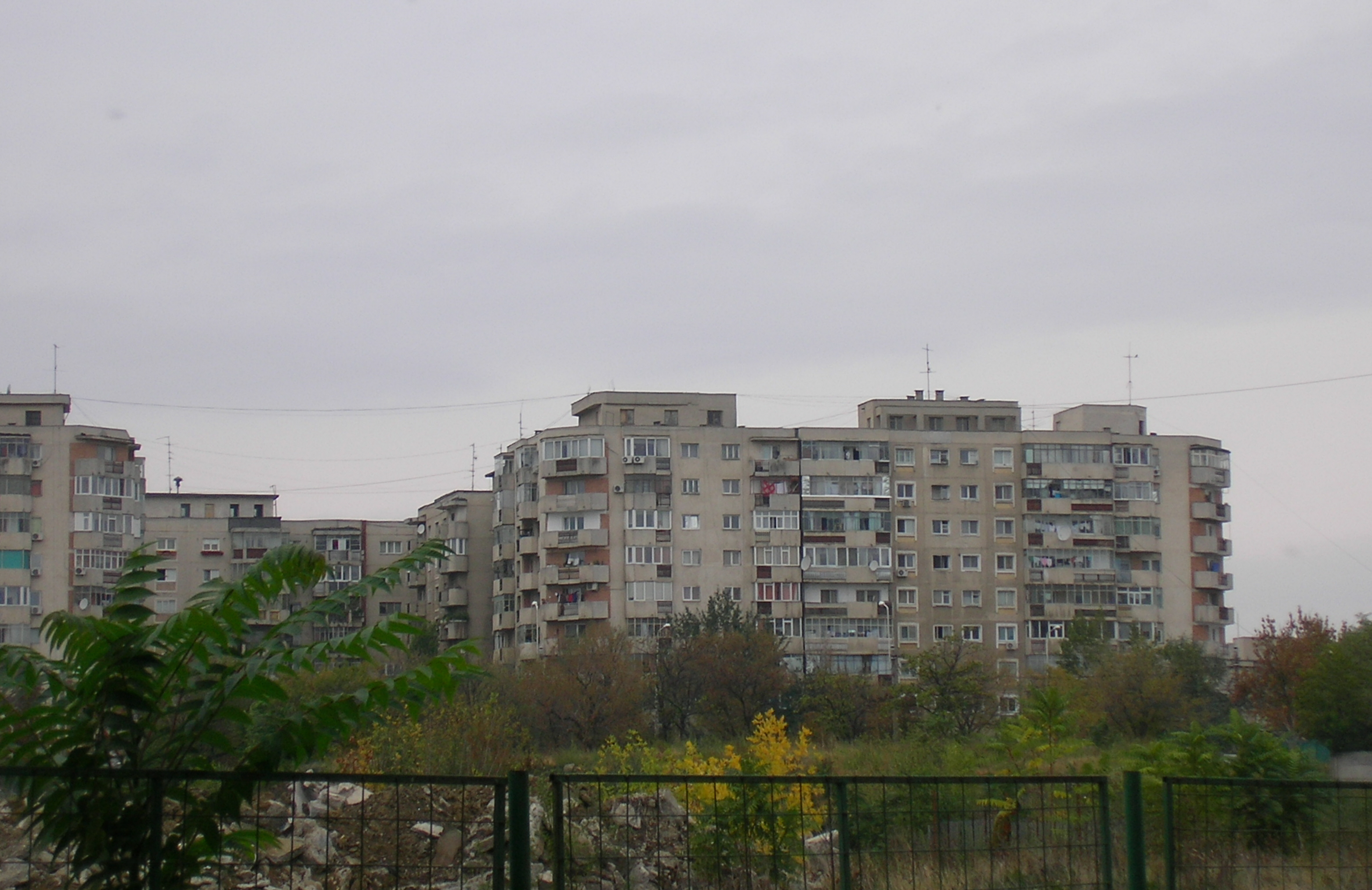
View in Vitan

Vitan is a neighborhood in southeastern Bucharest, Romania, along the Dâmbovița River. It is located in Sector 3, and lies between the Titan, Dristor, Centrul Civic, Olteniței, and Berceni districts.

== History ==
According to Dimitrie Papazoglu, its name comes from the Vitan Plain, where the cattle of the townspeople once grazed, while according to historian Adrian Majuru, the neighborhood's name comes from the name of a property owner, whose estate subsequently became a village that was later incorporated into the city of Bucharest. Vitan is one of the oldest neighborhoods of Bucharest, but does have extensive links to the Bucharest transport network.

The Bucharest Mall is situated in the north side of the neighborhood, while the Târca–Vitan Church is located on Calea Vitan. It was opened in 1999. The Bucharest Mall was the first shopping centre constructed in Romania and was built upon a former hunger circus. The now drained Lake Văcărești is located on the right bank of the Dâmbovița and the use of the 3.06 km^{2} (1.18 sq mi) of land owned by the state (evaluated to about $650 million) is still undecided. The neighborhood was mostly erased to allow for prefabricated apartment buildings to be constructed on their site between 1986 and 1992 (often constructed illegally without the required permissions), with typical architecture of the Communist era. Previously, the only new buildings in the area were the Vitan Post Office (1956) and Polyclinic (1967).
