= City Mall (Bucharest) =

- Location: Bucharest, Romania
- Coordinates: 44°24′6″N 26°5′52″E
- Opened: 2005
- Developer: Jaguar Development
- Owner: Victoria Holding
- Num. of stores: 120
- Floor area: 19,000 square metres (204,514.3 sq ft)
- Floors: 4
- Parking: 1,000 underground & deck

City Mall was a shopping mall located in Eroii Revolutiei square, Bucharest, Romania. Opened in 2005, the construction was based on an incomplete hunger circus abandoned after the fall of the Communist system.

The mall became insolvent in 2012, and was bought by real estate investor Ioannis Papalekas. In March 2013, Papalekas announced plans to convert the mall into an office building.
