= Buziașului =

District of Timișoara, Romania

Coordinates: 45°44′16″N 21°16′0″E

Buziașului is a predominantly industrial district located in the southeastern part of Timișoara, Romania. Its name comes from the homonymous road (Calea Buziașului) that connects Timișoara to Buziaș. In recent years, important areas of Buziașului have been revitalized through urban regeneration, evolving into mixed-use zones that combine commercial and residential spaces. Buziașului is one of the cheapest areas of the city for renting homes.
