= Vox Technology Park =

Office building in Timișoara, Romania

Coordinates: 45.7750337°N 21.2135582°E

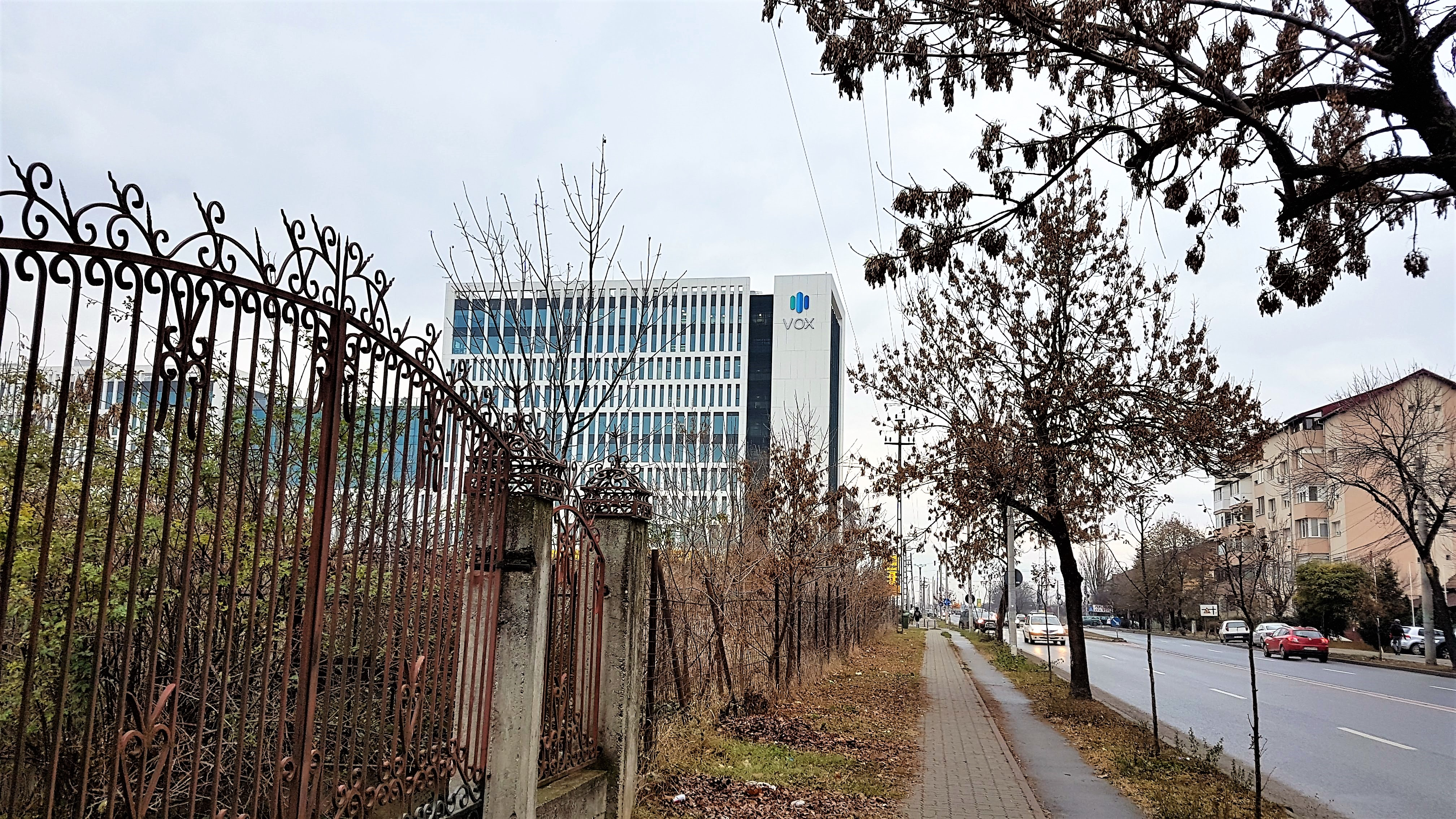
Vox Technology Park seen from Calea Torontalului

Vox Technology Park is a 10-story office building in the western Romanian city of Timișoara. Completed in 2018 following an investment of 30 million euros, the office building is located on Calea Torontalului, a major traffic artery in the north of the city.

Built on an area of 35,136 square meters, Vox Technology Park comprises a 10-story building interconnected with a 7-story building, which resembles an arch made of white steel and blue-green glass. It is designed to accommodate office and related functions. It features a car park in the basement, commercial spaces and office lobbies on the ground floor, and office areas spread across the upper floors, totaling 26,266 square meters. The 7th floor of the smaller building includes a food court, conference rooms, and a 750-square-meter suspended terrace. Vox Technology Park is over 90% leased to companies such as Kromberg & Schubert, ATOSS, Tech Mahindra, Connect44, Casa Rusu, PORR, Vitesco Technologies, Vodafone, and Spyrosoft.

The architectural design of Vox Technology Park was created by Studio Arca, with Werk MB Construct serving as the general contractor and Hafner Consulting overseeing project management. The building is BREEAM certified, receiving the Outstanding rating during the design phase, the highest score obtained so far in Romania.

== See also ==
- List of technology centers
