= Iulius Mall Iași =

- Location: Iași, Romania
- Coordinates: 47.155517°N 27.605117°E
- Opened: 21 April 2000
- Owner: Iulius Group & Atterbury Europe
- Num. of stores: 200+
- Floor area: 25,400 square metres (273,403.3 sq ft)
- Floors: 4
- Parking: 1,000

Iulius Mall Iaşi is a shopping mall located in Iași, Romania. At the time of its completion it was the second mall in Romania (after București Mall), and the first outside Bucharest.

The mall has:

- 200+ stores
- five-screen movie theatre complex with 865 seats
- 20 fast food and other restaurants with 700 seats
- Carrefour Market
- games, bowling, billiards & entertainment
- Kidsland club

== See also ==
- Palas Iași
- Iulius Town Timișoara
- Iulius Mall Cluj
- Iulius Mall Suceava
