= Hunger circus =

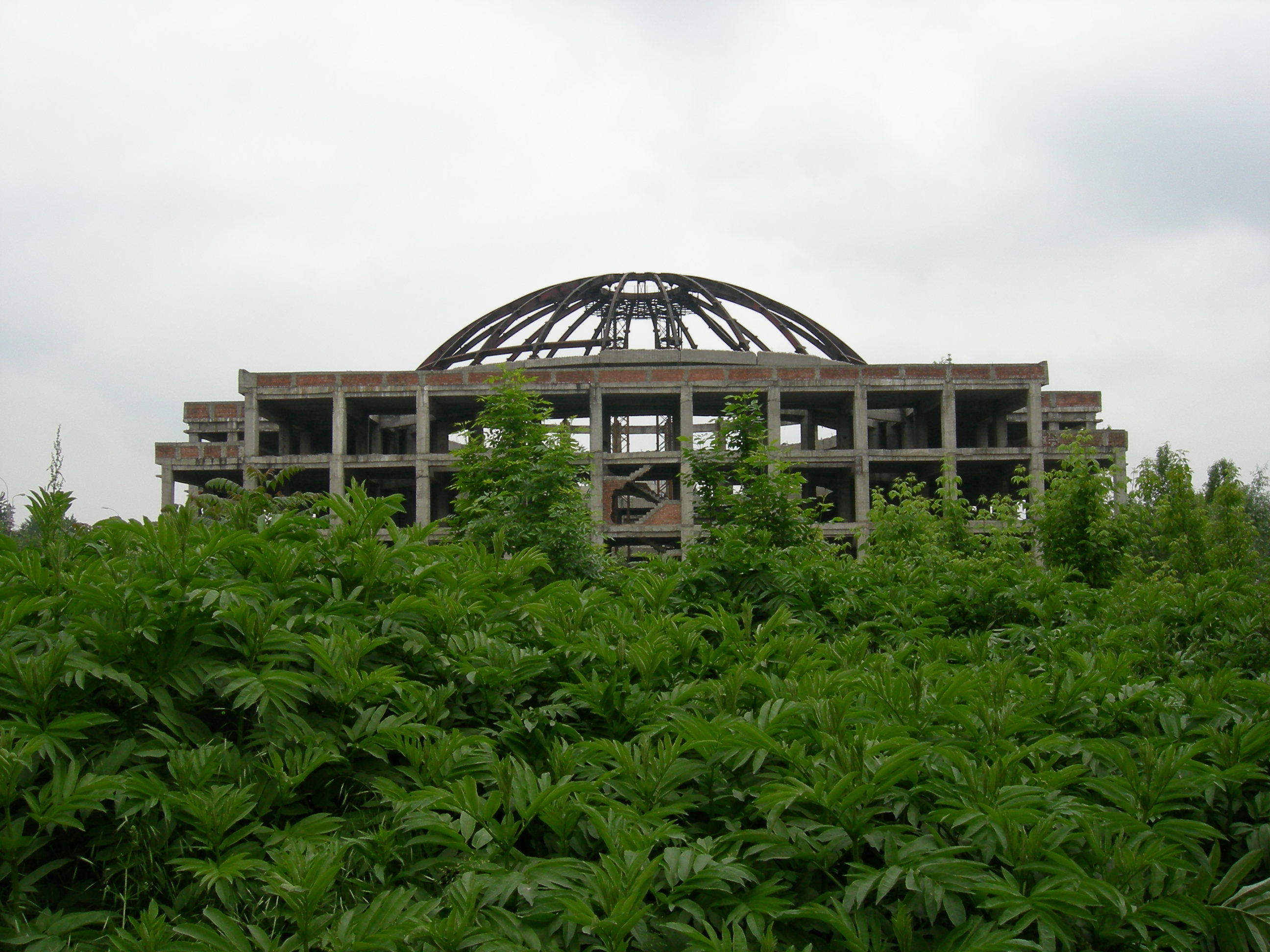
Unfinished "hunger circus" in Rahova, 2006

"Hunger circus" (Romanian: Circ al foamei) was a colloquial name for any in a series of identical buildings which were to be completed as part of President Nicolae Ceaușescu's program of systematization during his period as ruler of Romania. Officially designated by the communist regime as "complex comercial agroindustrial", oftentimes miscalled "complex agroalimentar", these large domed buildings were intended as produce markets and public refectories. It appears to have been Ceauşescu's vision that they would serve as food distribution centres, eliminating the need for selling or distributing food anywhere else.

The name "hunger circuses", now so universally used as to have almost suppressed the memory of the official communist-era term, derived from the circus-like domed architecture and the irony of constructing these massive food-related buildings during a period when food was scarce throughout Romania, due to Ceaușescu's policy of exporting most of Romania's agricultural produce in order to pay off the foreign debt. The irony was reinforced by the connotation of "circus" as ridiculous farce.

At the time of Ceaușescu's downfall and execution, only two hunger circuses had been completed: One of these, Pantelimon, now forms part of a public market in the Delfinului area of Bucharest; the other, also in Bucharest, is placed close to the Unirea shopping mall, nestled between Piața Unirii and Sfânta Vineri Street. Several others stood half-finished in scattered locations around Bucharest, surrounded by rusting construction cranes and vacant lots.

The hunger circuses left unfinished after the 1989 Revolution were later completed, as malls such as the Bucharest Mall in Vitan, City Mall and Plaza Romania in Militari. The hunger circus in Rahova was partially demolished in November 2006 to make room for a new mall – Liberty Center Mall. Another hunger circus was transformed into a private university.
