= Mall Moldova =

- Location: Iași, Romania
- Coordinates: 47.167309°N 27.513465°E
- Opened: 24 September 2008
- Renovated: 17 April 2025
- Previous names: ERA Shopping Park Iași
- Owner: Prime Kapital & MAS PLC
- Num. of stores: 250+
- Num. of anchor tenants: 5
- Floor area: 110,000 square metres (1,184,030.1 sq ft)
- Floors: 2
- Parking: 3,500
- Public transit: CTP Iași Buses 20, 30b, 43c
- Website: mallmoldova.ro

Mall Moldova is a super-regional mall located in Iași, Romania. With a total GLA of over 110,000 m^{2} (1,200,000 sq ft), it is the largest mall in Romania from outside Bucharest.

== History ==
Inaugurated in April 2025, Mall Moldova represents an expansion and redevelopment of the former ERA Shopping Park Iași (opened in September 2008 by Ermes Holding, part of Omilos Group). It features the region's largest hypermarket, a large entertainment and leisure facility, and a dedicated home furnishing hub.

The mall has:

- 250+ stores
- nine-screen movie theatre complex with 4DX technology and 1,500 seats
- food-court with 30+ fast food and restaurants, and 2,500 seats
