= Lotus Center =

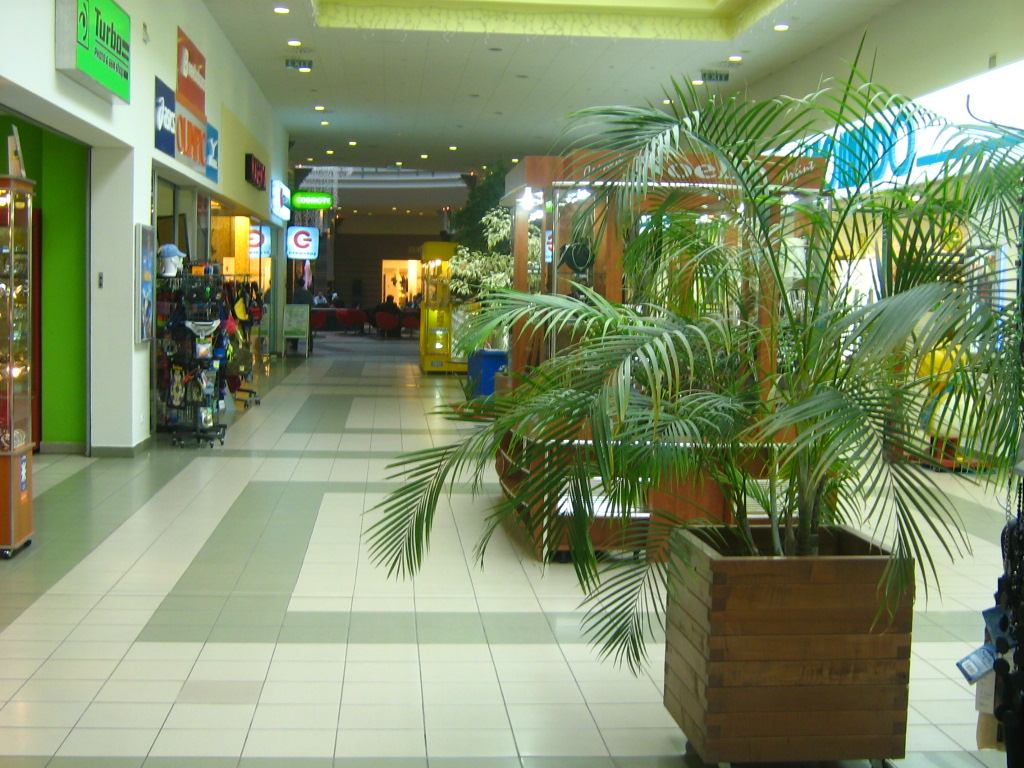
- Location: Oradea, Romania
- Opened: 2002
- Developer: Alexandru Mudura
- Floor area: 40,000 square metres (430,556 sq ft)
- Floors: 1
- Parking: 1,400

Lotus Center is the first and largest shopping mall in Oradea, Romania. It was opened under the name of Lotus Market in 2002 by the local businessman Alexandru Mudura. In 2006 the shopping mall has undergone several modernization and expansion works.

The center include around 150 stores, a multiplex, a hypermarket, restaurants and luxury shops. The complex has a floor area of 40,000 square metres (430,556 sq ft) and 1,400 parking spaces.
