= Styler =

Styler is a surname and may refer to:

- Alan Styler (1925–1970), English opera singer
- Burt Styler (1925–2011), American television and film screenwriter and producer
- Divine Styler (born 1968), American alternative hip-hop artist
- John Styler (1923–1999), American professional basketball player
- Sidney Styler (1908–1980), English cricketer
- Trudie Styler (born 1954), English actress, film producer and director
