= Iulius Mall Suceava =

- Location: Suceava, Romania
- Opened: 15 November 2008
- Owner: Iulius Group & Atterbury Europe
- Architect: Valentin Ilie and Calin Caliman (Rocada Architects)
- Num. of stores: 170
- Floor area: 48,945 square metres (526,839.6 sq ft)
- Floors: 3
- Parking: 1,692

Iulius Mall Suceava is a shopping mall in Suceava, Romania.

== History ==
Opened on 15 November 2008, the mall has:

- 170 stores
- Auchan hypermarket
- Bricostore
- Cinema City ten-screen movie theater complex
- 24 fast food and other restaurants
- Fitness club
- Games including bowling and billiards
- Kidsland
- 1,300 parking spaces
- Walk-in COVID-19 vaccination centre

The mall has a colourful 265 m (870 ft) chimney. It is planned to transform it into an observation tower.

== Gallery ==
The sign of the mall

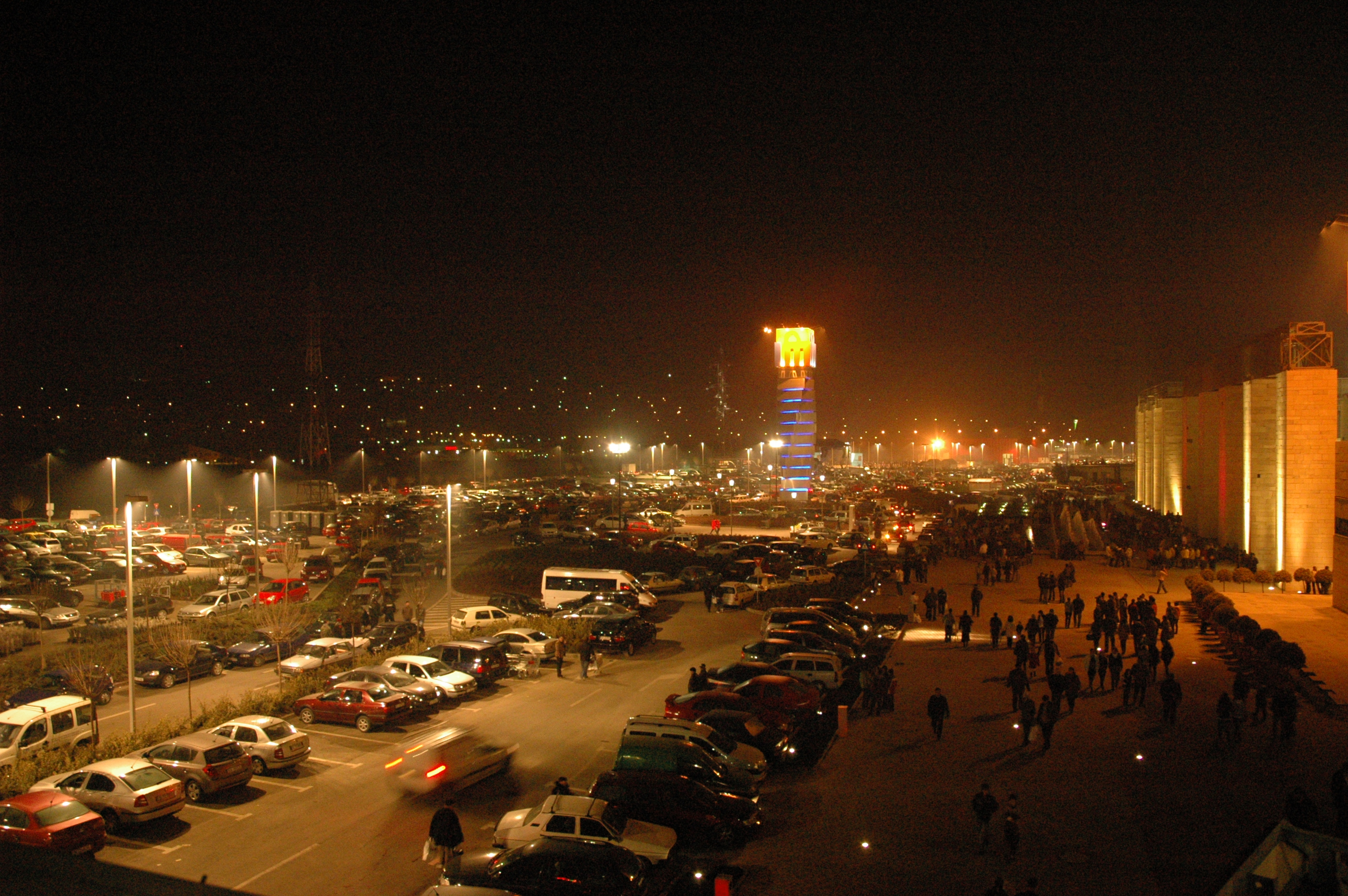
Parking lot at night

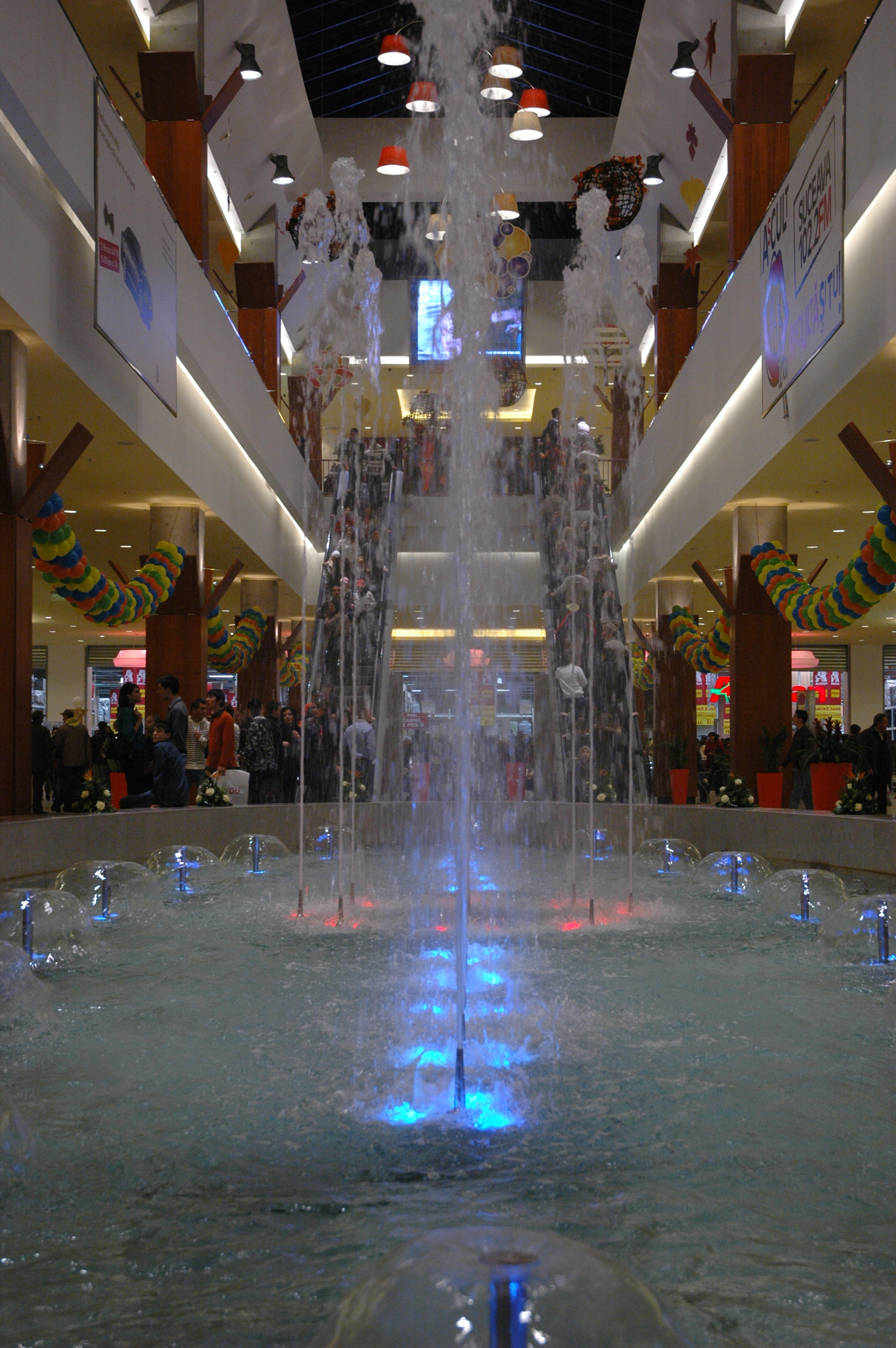
The fountain in the main hall

== See also ==
- Palas Iași
- Iulius Town Timișoara
- Iulius Mall Cluj
- Iulius Mall Iași
