= Palas Iași =

Palas Mall
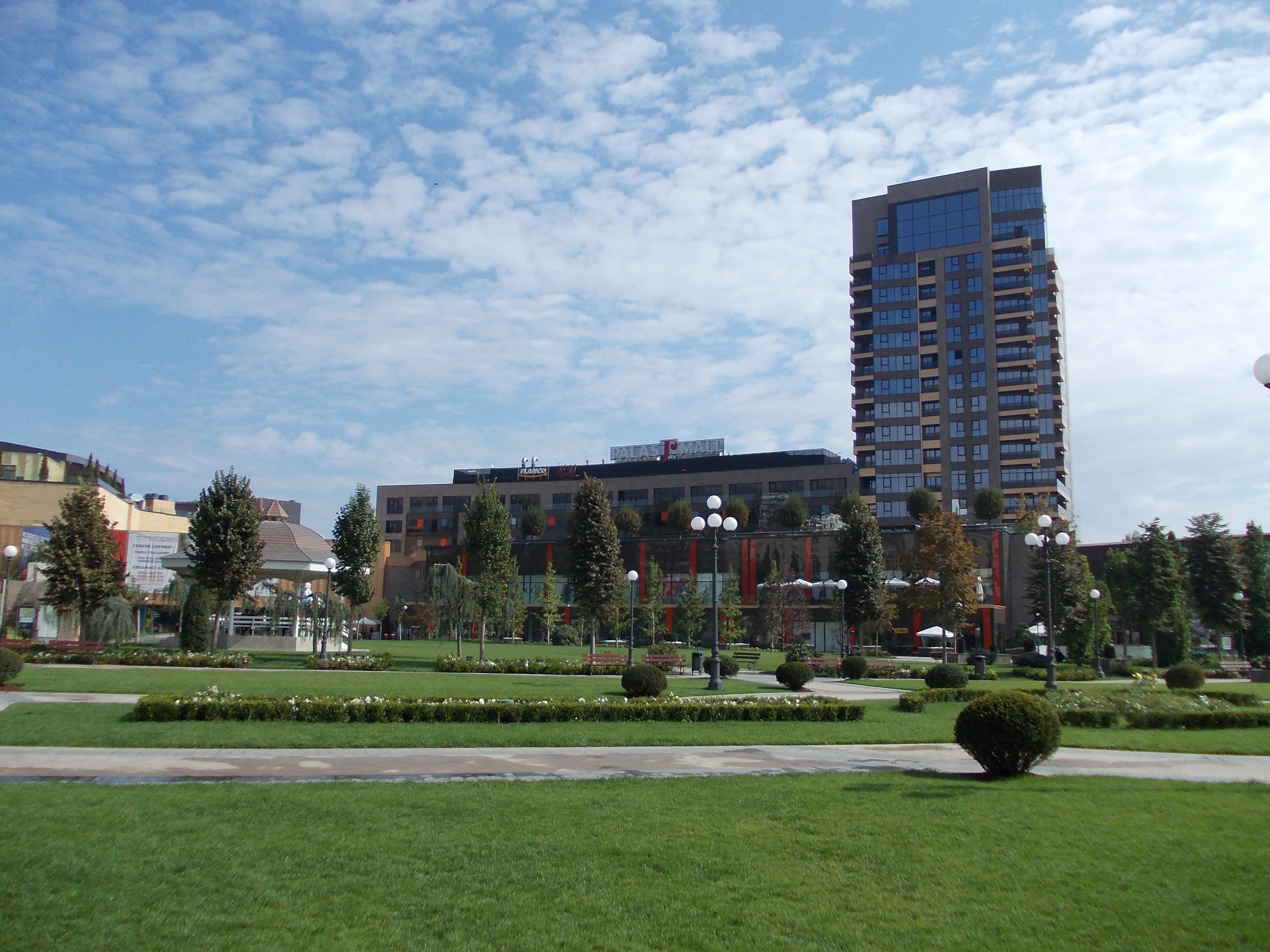
- Location: Iași, Romania
- Coordinates: 47.156374°N 27.589174°E
- Opened: 31 May 2012
- Owner: Iulius Group
- Num. of stores: 270
- Floor area: 62,000 m^{2} (670,000 sq ft)
- Floors: 3
- Parking: 2,500

Palas Iași is a commercial area in Iași, Romania located in the Civic Centre district, in the vicinity of the emblematic Palace of Culture.

== Project ==
Designed as a mixed-use development the area consists of a large lifestyle center (known as Palas Mall) with 270 shops and restaurants, on a gross leasable area (GLA) of over 62,000 m^{2} (670,000 sq ft). The project also includes 75,600 m^{2} (814,000 sq ft) of Class A office space in seven buildings, hotel and a public garden.

The total built area of the project is over 270,000 square metres (2,906,255.8 sq ft).

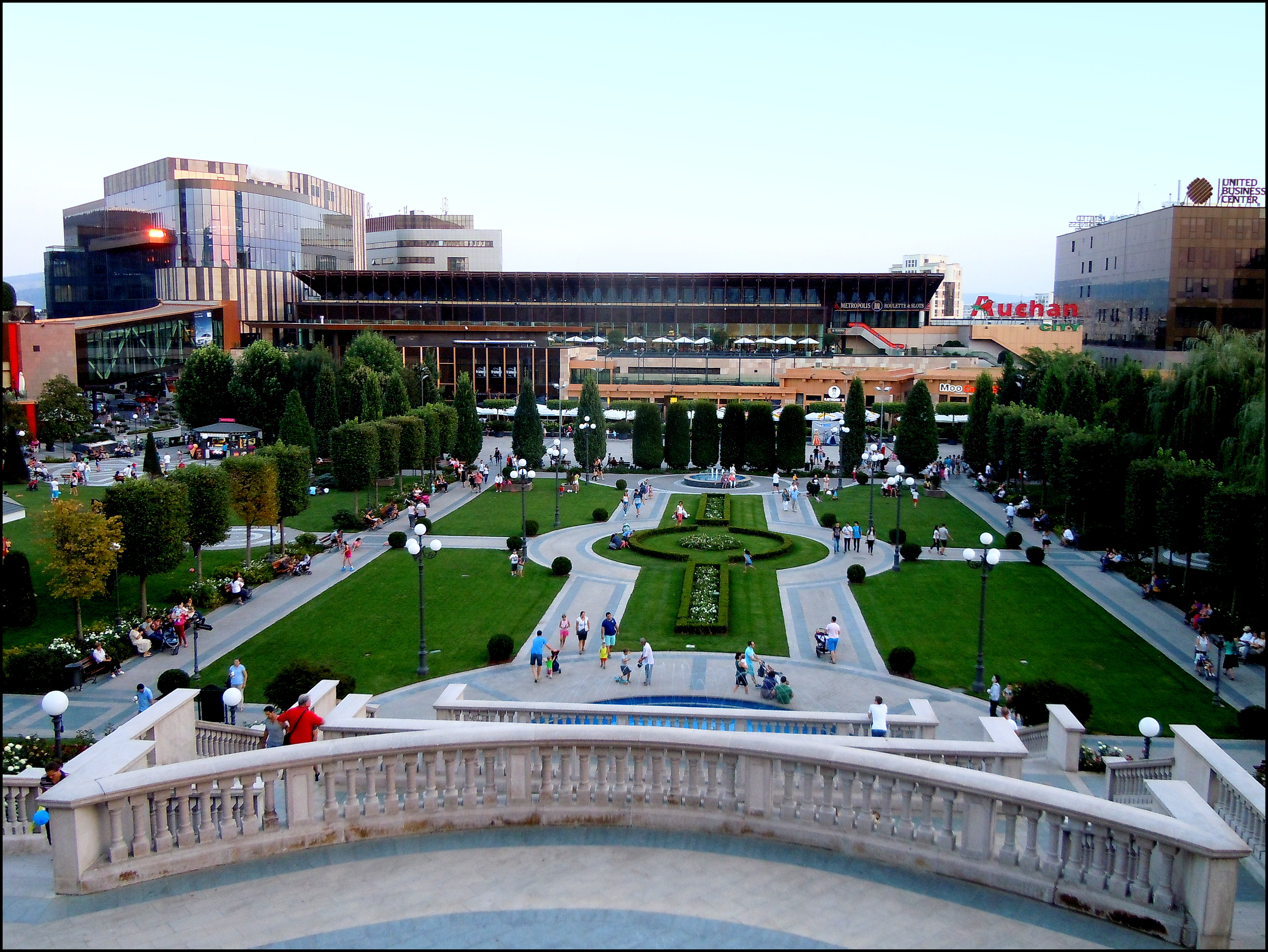
Palas Garden

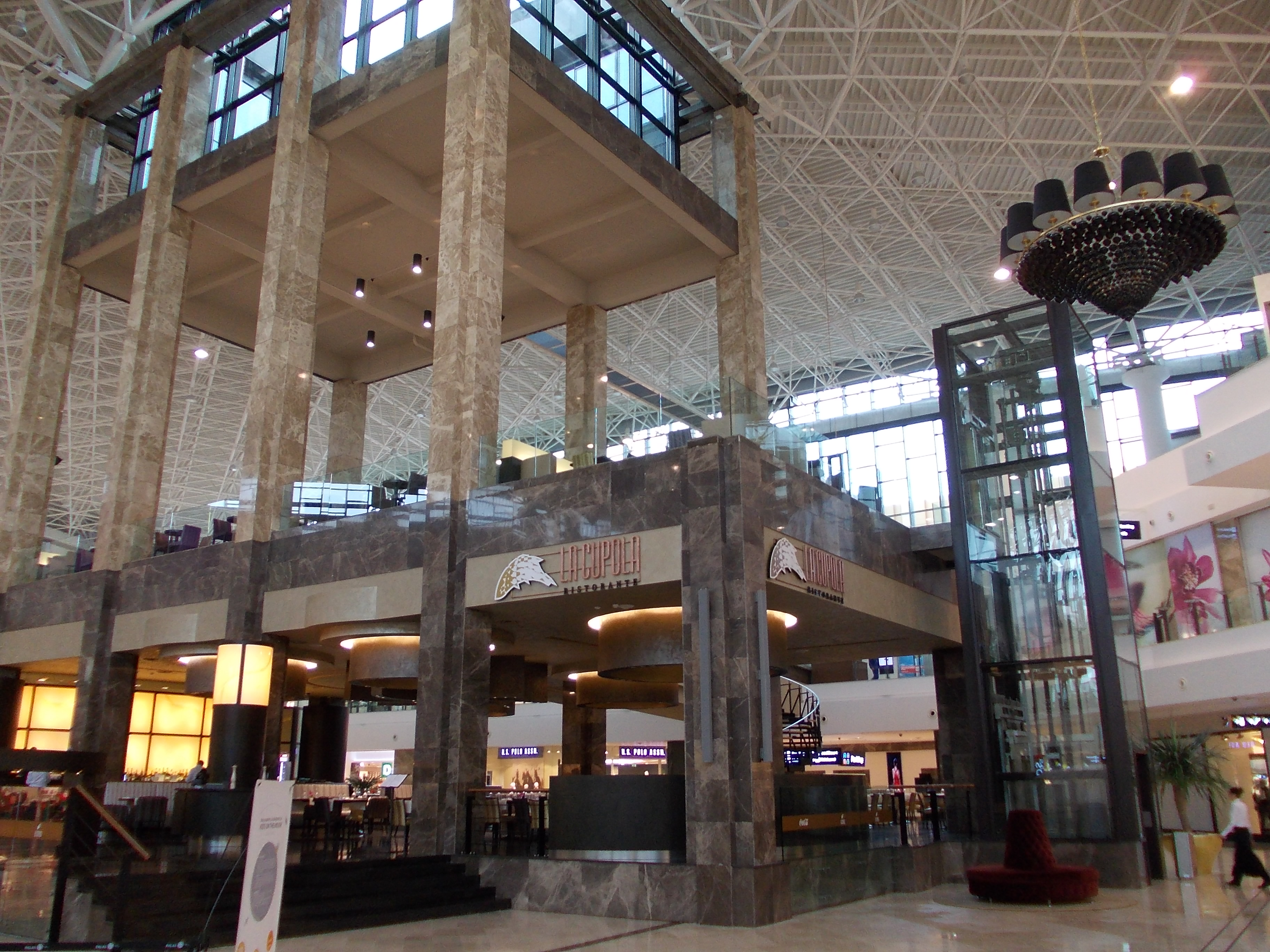
Palas Mall - Atrium area

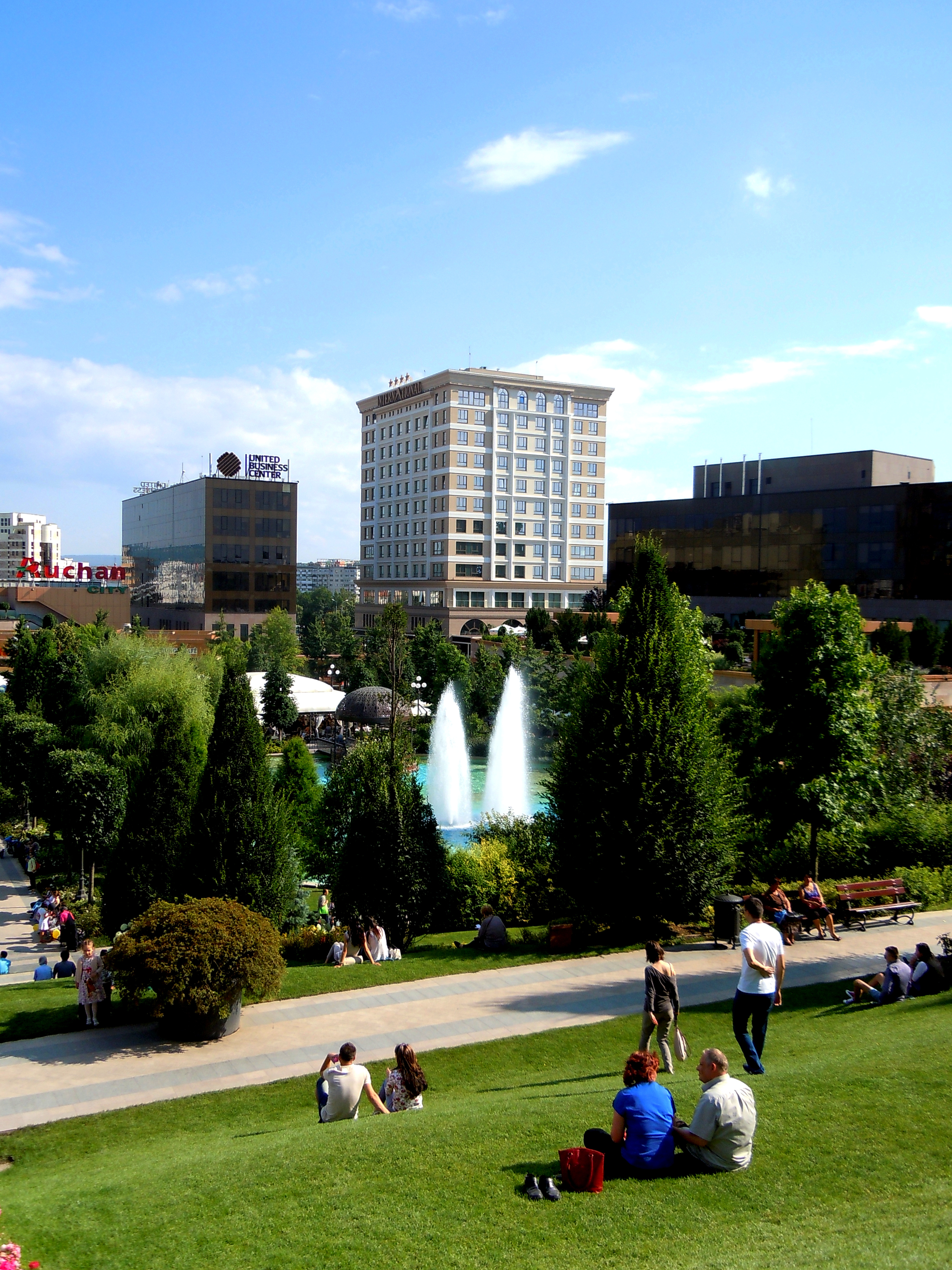
Hotel International and office buildings

== See also ==
- Iulius Town Timișoara
- Iulius Mall Iași
- Iulius Mall Cluj
- Iulius Mall Suceava
