= AFI Europe =

European real estate development company

- Company type: Privately held company
- Industry: Real estate
- Founded: 1997; 28 years ago
- Founder: AFI Group (Africa Israel Investments)
- Headquarters: Amsterdam, Netherlands (Since 2004)
- Area served: Central and Eastern Europe
- Products: Real estate developments
- Number of employees: 150 (2023)
- Website: afi-properties.com; www.afi-europe.cz; afieurope.ro

AFI Europe is a real estate development and investment company operating in several main cities in Central and Eastern Europe. AFI Europe predominantly focuses on the development of large scale residential and commercial projects, and is part of the AFI Group, an Israeli holdings and investments conglomerate.

== History ==
The company commenced its operations in 1997 and coordinates AFI Group activities in Europe, and is headquartered in the Netherlands since 2006.

== Projects And Properties ==
The assets portfolio of AFI Europe consists of shopping malls and retail properties, business parks and office complexes, large-scale residential and mixed-use projects and income-yielding residential properties.

Among the company's more famous assets are AFI Palace Cotroceni, the largest shopping mall in Bucharest; the Airport City business park in Belgrade; the Classic 7 office project in Prague and pl:Osiedle Europejskie, a large-scale residential project in Kraków.

== Controversy ==
During the money laundering case United States v. Prevezon Holdings which involved Sergei Magnitsky companies stolen by Denis Katsyv, Prevezon Holdings accounts with AFI Europe were frozen but, after the out of court settlement was reached between Joon Kim, the acting US Attorney for the Southern District of New York, and both Louis Freeh and Natalia Veselnitskaya, who were attorneys for Prevezon, Prevezon stated that money to pay its $5.9 million fine would come from the Netherlands from more than $3 million that AFI Europe owed to Prevezon.

== Countries of operation ==
AFI Europe owns, develops and manages properties and projects in Serbia, Czech Republic Germany, Hungary, Bulgaria, Poland, Latvia, and Romania. with on-the-ground teams comprising more than 150 professionals.
