= Fabric Water Tower =

- Turnul de apă din Fabric
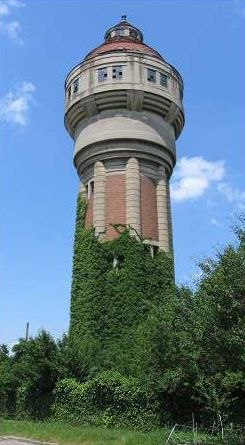
- Interactive map of the Fabric Water Tower area
- Alternative names: Fabric Water Castle

General information
- Status: Unused
- Type: Water tower
- Architectural style: Secession
- Location: Timișoara, Romania
- Coordinates: 45°45′56″N 21°15′3″E
- Construction started: 1912
- Completed: 1914

Height
- Height: 52 m

Design and construction
- Architects: János Lenarduzzi; Richárd Sabathiel
- Engineer: Stan Vidrighin

The Fabric Water Tower (Romanian: Turnul de apă din Fabric) is an industrial monument in Timișoara, Romania. It was one of the sources of water supply in Timișoara at the beginning of the 20th century. It is classified as a national heritage site (Romanian: monument istoric) with LMI code TM-II-m-A-06122.

== History ==
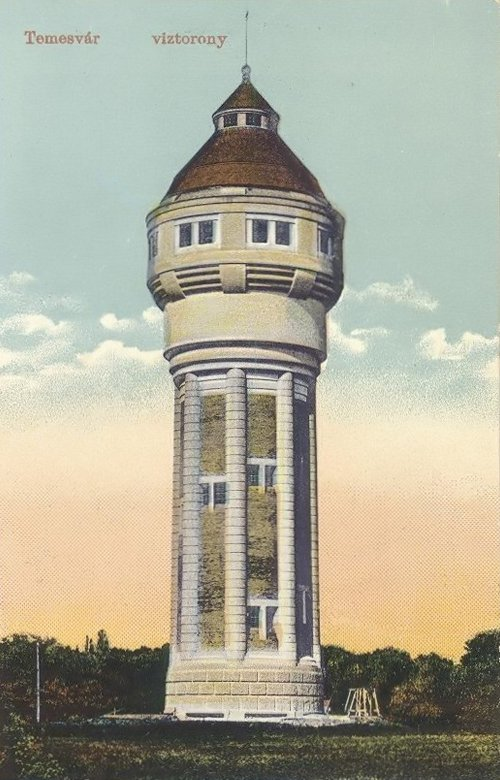
The Fabric Water Tower in 1914

The first reference to a well dug inside the Huniade Castle dates back to 1551. Nevertheless, as Ottoman traveler Evliya Çelebi described, for a long time Timișoara has been supplied with water from the Bega River. The matter was also confirmed by Austrian traveler Henrik Ottendorf, who visited Timișoara in 1660 and later in 1663.

After the conquest of Timișoara by the Habsburgs in 1716, in 1729 the construction of an aqueduct began. It was supposed to bring water from Giarmata, but the plan was ultimately abandoned. In 1732, a pumping station designed to pump water from Bega and filter it through several layers of sawdust was built on the site of the current Alexandru Sterca-Suluțiu Square in Fabric. In 1774, engineer Alexander Steinlein designed and built there a water tower to supply the city with water. It was destroyed during the 1849 siege; therefore the city was then supplied with water only from wells.

In 1891, after the demolition of Timișoara Fortress, the idea of a water supply and sewerage system resembling those in other European cities was set in motion and many projects were initiated, some of them, between 1904 and 1907, by Stan Vidrighin, mayor of Timișoara between 1919 and 1921 and from February to August 1922. After researching the systems in Dresden, Berlin, Hamburg, Cologne, Strasbourg, Karlsruhe and London, engineers János Lenarduzzi (1865–1916) and Richárd Sabathiel (1875–1942) executed a project countersigned by Stan Vidrighin, who had calculated the necessities and possibilities and had drawn up the task planner. After the sewerage system had been finished and the waterworks had come into use, two towers were built at the two ends of the distribution network between 1912 and 1914, which served to compensate for possible water outages in case of repairs or malfunctions. The 52-meter high towers support a backup tank each, tanks that ensured the city's water supply for four hours, in case the central supply system would not have worked.

After World War II, more water plants came into use and the towers were no longer necessary for their initial purpose. Drinking water was provided by about 100 drilled wells, which extracted water from 100 to 250 meters underground. In the early 2000s, the Fabric Water Tower was given over by the Timișoara City Hall to 1 Iunie factory, a former local manufacturer of children's products.

== See also ==
- Iosefin Water Tower
