= Băneasa Shopping City =

Coordinates: 44.50569°N 26.08899°E

Baneasa Shopping City
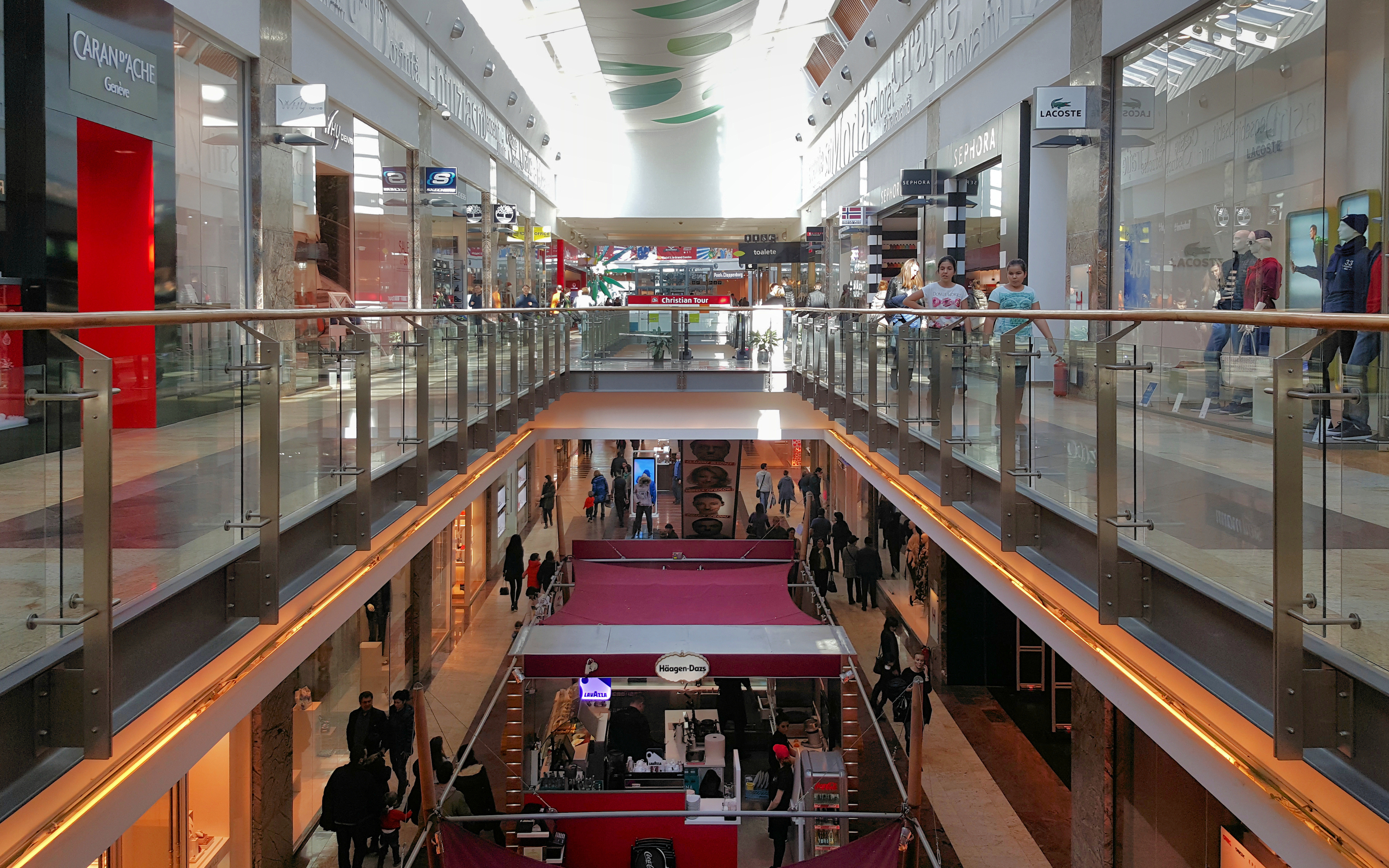
- Inside Băneasa Shopping City
- Location: Bucharest, Romania
- Opened: 2008
- Num. of stores: 250
- Floor area: 55,000 square metres (590,000 sq ft)
- Floors: 4
- Parking: Over 8,000 + 1,500 underground

Băneasa Shopping City is a shopping center in the north of Bucharest, Romania, opened on 18 April 2008. Located in the Băneasa neighborhood of Sector 1, it is part of the Băneasa Developments owned by Aurel Gabriel Popoviciu and Radu Timofte.

Besides the Băneasa Commercial Platform, Băneasa Developments orchestrates a mix of real estate developments, shopping center management and an extensive entertainment unit. Băneasa Shopping City is an extensive commercial and real estate area located in the northern area of Bucharest.

== History ==
The mall was constructed by French firm Bouygues in 2008. Investment in the mall development was 150 million euros. Băneasa Shopping City is the fifth mall opened in Bucharest, after Bucharest Mall, Plaza Romania, City Mall and Unirea Shopping Center. In total, it includes 280 stores. The shopping center attracted more than 750,000 visitors in the first month.

The mall has 55,000 square meters of retail space and also includes Grand Cinema&More, inaugurated in 2011, with the Dolby Atmos technology. It also has a quarterly fashion and lifestyle magazine (Styler) and has developed one of the most efficient intelligent building management systems in Romania.
