= Iulius Mall Cluj =

- Location: Cluj-Napoca, Romania
- Opened: 10 November 2007
- Owner: Iulius Group & Atterbury Europe
- Num. of stores: 250
- Floor area: 49,800 m^{2} (536,000 sq ft)
- Parking: 2,180

Iulius Mall Cluj is a shopping mall in Cluj-Napoca, Romania, and was opened on 10 November 2007. It has 4 floors, 2 of them being underground and roof parking lots.

It has 250 stores including one hypermarket Auchan (16,000 m^{2} (170,000 sq ft)) and several anchors, such as : Auchan, Inditex Group (Zara, Bershka, Pull & Bear, Stradivarius, Massimo Dutti), Tommy Hilfiger, H&M, Cinema City. It has a 10 screen cinema complex, 25 fast-food and three restaurants. It has a 2,000 m^{2} (22,000 sq ft) swimming pool and a fitness club. There are 2,180 parking spaces.

It also has a 10,000 m^{2} (110,000 sq ft) exterior park with a lake view, called Iulius Park.

== See also ==
- Palas Iași
- Iulius Town Timișoara
- Iulius Mall Iași
- Iulius Mall Suceava
