= Iosefin Water Tower =

National heritage site

- Turnul de apă din Iosefin
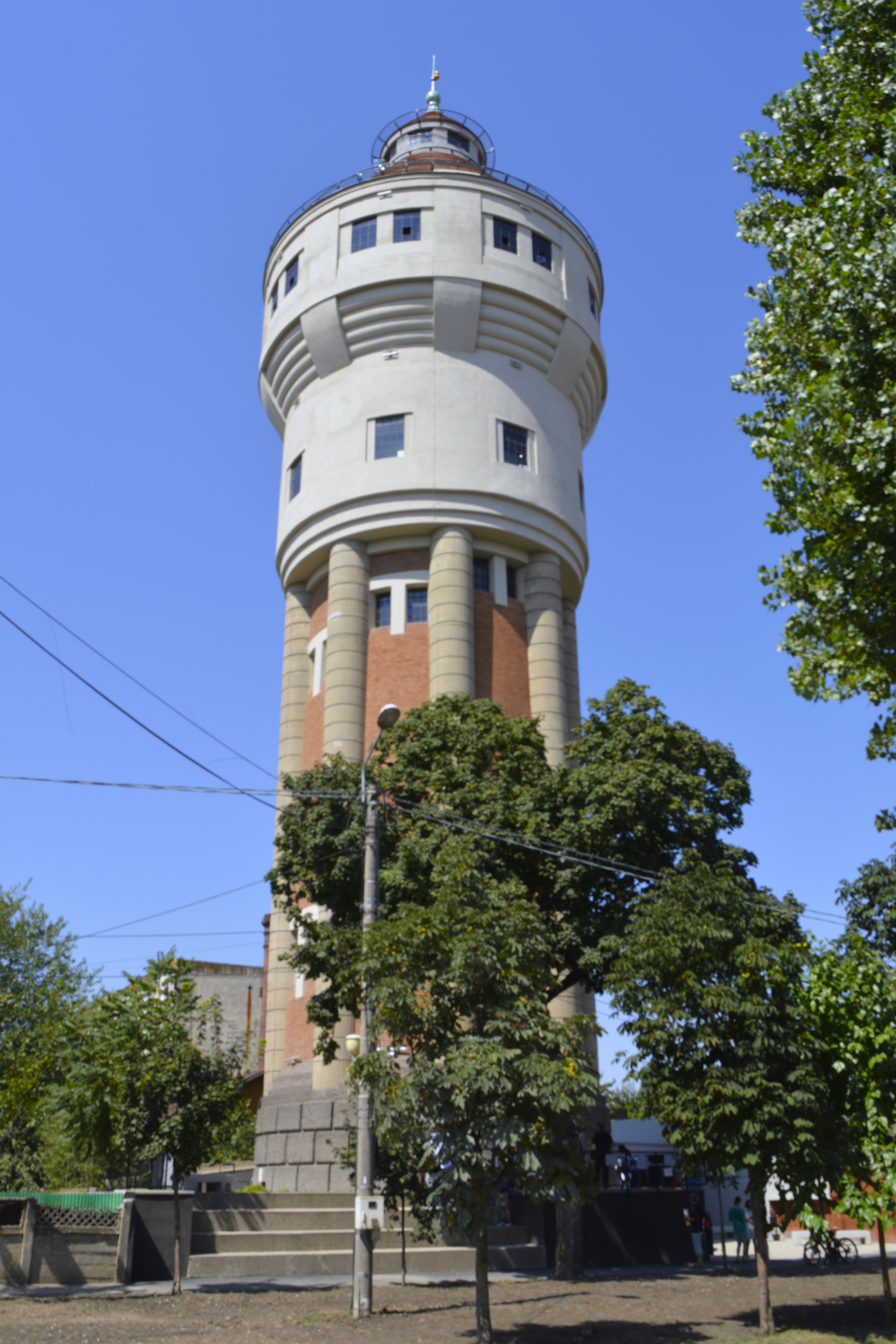
- Interactive map of the Iosefin Water Tower area
- Alternative names: Iosefin Water Castle

General information
- Type: Water tower
- Architectural style: Secession
- Location: Timișoara, Romania
- Coordinates: 45°44′43″N 21°12′5″E
- Construction started: 1912
- Completed: 1913
- Cost: 203,500 Kr.
- Owner: Timișoara City Hall

Height
- Height: 52 m

Design and construction
- Architects: János Lenarduzzi; Richárd Sabathiel
- Engineer: Stan Vidrighin

Website
- casteluldeapa.ro

The Iosefin Water Tower (Romanian: Turnul de apă din Iosefin) is an industrial monument in Timișoara, Romania. It was one of the sources of water supply in Timișoara at the beginning of the 20th century. It is classified as a national heritage site (Romanian: monument istoric) with LMI code TM-II-m-A-06152.

== History ==
The Iosefin Water Tower was built between December 1912 and September 1913 by the Budapest company of János Lenarduzzi, as part of the drinking water distribution network of Timișoara, which also included its twin water tower in Fabric. A tower cost over 200,000 kroner at the time. The two served as reservoirs, which were permanently filled with water to maintain the same water pressure everywhere in the city and to supply households for 3–4 hours, in case of repairs of malfunctions. In their premises were the employees' residences and a telephone station through which they communicated with the water plant.

Just like the Fabric Water Tower, its superior level is equipped with a drinking water tank of 500 m^{3}, but it also has an industrial water tank (from the Bega River) of 250 m^{3} situated at an inferior level.

Until 2012, it was owned by Aquatim (the company that manages the water supply and sewerage of Timișoara), after which it was taken over by the city hall. Before this, former mayor Nicolae Robu tried to sell the tower to private individuals, but local councillors struck down the project amid public uproar. Later, in 2018, the city hall announced its plans of setting up a small cultural café and a coffee museum inside the tower, dedicated to Francesco Illy, a Timișoara-born businessman who invented an espresso machine. The Iosefin Water Tower was included in 2020 in a large-scale, EEA and Norway Grants-funded project aiming at its transformation into a permanent cultural center with a café, an exhibition hall, a foyer and a belvedere. Rehabilitation works began in September 2021 and were completed in July 2026.

== See also ==
- Fabric Water Tower
