= ALTEX =

- Discipline: Alternatives to animal testing
- Language: English
- Edited by: Sonja von Aulock

Publication details
- Former name: Alternativen zu Tierexperimenten
- History: 1984-present
- Publisher: Springer Spektrum
- Frequency: Quarterly
- Open access: Yes
- License: Creative Commons Attribution 4.0 International
- Impact factor: 5.8 (2024)

Standard abbreviations
- ISO 4: ALTEX

Indexing
- ISSN: 1868-596X (print); 1868-8551 (web)
- OCLC no.: 690935010
- ALTEX: Alternativen zu Tierexperimenten
- ISSN: 0946-7785

Links
- Journal homepage; Online archive; Journal page at publisher's website

ALTEX: Alternatives to Animal Experimentation is a quarterly peer-reviewed scientific journal covering alternatives to animal experimentation and related issues of bioethics, seeking to promote the replacement, reduction, and refinement of animal use in research (the "3Rs"). It was originally published in German and established in 1984 as ALTEX: Alternativen zu Tierexperimenten and is published by Springer Spektrum on behalf of the Swiss Society ALTEX Edition.

It is the official journal of Center for Alternatives to Animal Testing, the American Society for Cellular and Computational Toxicology, the European consensus platform for alternatives, the European Society for Alternatives to Animal Testing, and the transatlantic think tank for toxicology. It has been an open access journal since 2011 under a Creative Commons Attribution 4.0 license.

The journal has two companion publications: ALTEX Proceedings (ISSN 2194-0479), which publishes proceedings of scientific conferences relating to the 3Rs, and TIERethik, a biannual German-language periodical on bioethics and human-animal studies.

== Abstracting and indexing ==
The journal is abstracted and indexed in Index Medicus/MEDLINE/PubMed, Science Citation Index Expanded, Scopus, and Embase. According to the Journal Citation Reports, the journal has a 2020 impact factor of 6.043.
