= AFI Cotroceni =

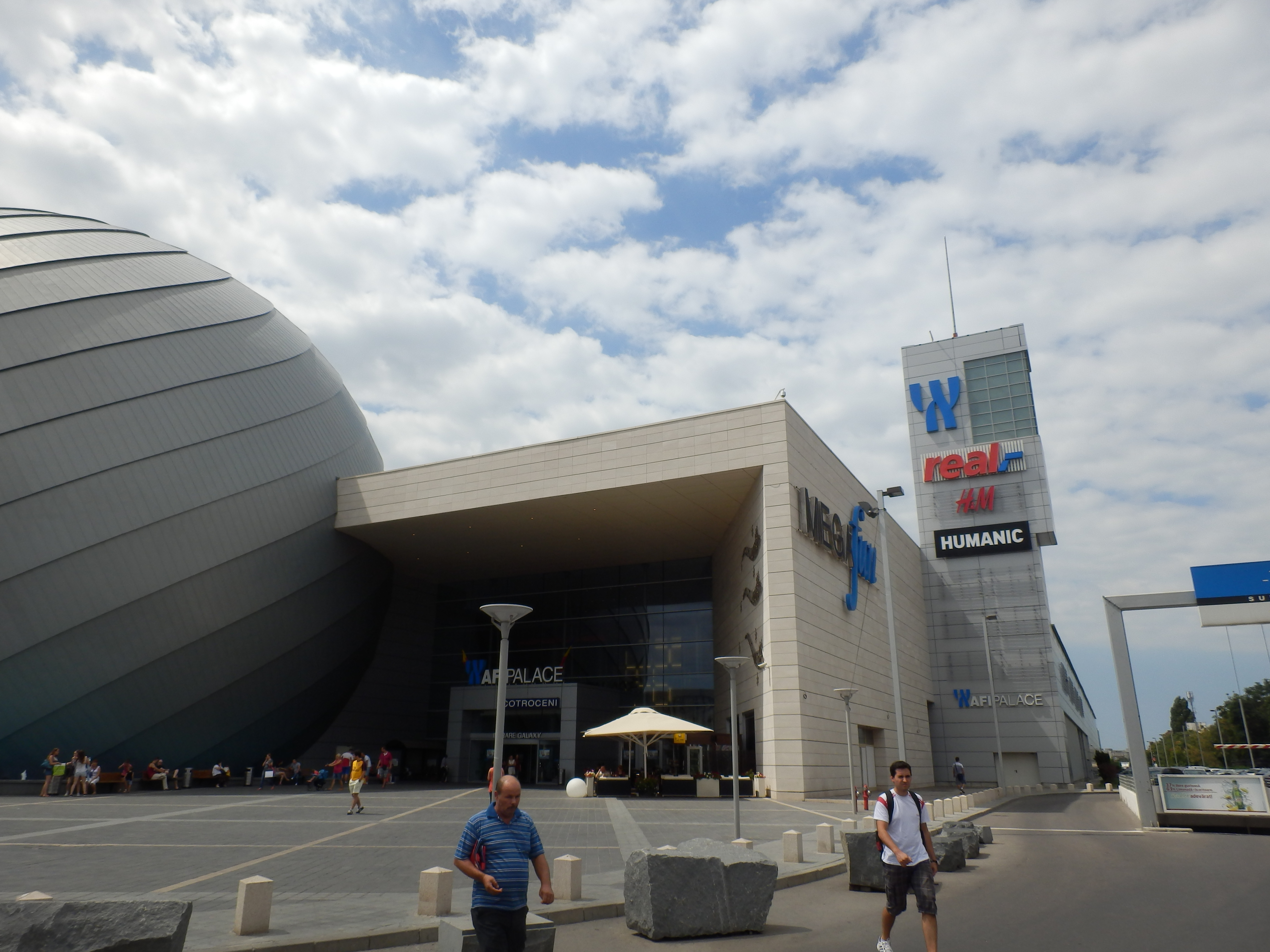
- Location: Bucharest, Romania
- Coordinates: 44°25′48″N 26°3′9″E
- Opened: October 29, 2009
- Developer: AFI Europe NV (Africa Israel Investments) & New Century Holding
- Num. of stores: 300
- Floor area: ≈ 90,000 m^{2} (970,000 sq ft)
- Website: www.aficotroceni.ro

AFI Cotroceni is a shopping mall in Bucharest, Romania. It is located in the western part of the city, between the city center and two of the largest residential districts, Militari and Drumul Taberei. With approximately 90,000 m^{2} (970,000 sq ft) of gross leasable area, AFI Cotroceni is Romania's largest shopping mall.

== Events ==
In September 2016 the final tournament of the 2016 FIBA Europe 3x3 Championships, the European Championships of 3x3 basketball, was contested within the shopping centre.
