= Plaza Romania =

- Location: Bucharest, Romania
- Coordinates: 44°25′42.52″N 26°2′5.33″E
- Opened: 2004
- Owner: Anchor Group
- Num. of stores: 170
- Floor area: 46,880 square metres (504,612.1 sq ft)
- Floors: 4
- Parking: 2,000 underground & deck

Plaza Romania is a shopping mall in Bucharest, Romania. The construction, based on an uncompleted hunger circus abandoned after the fall of Nicolae Ceaușescu, has three distinguishable parts — a central structure with a dome 40 metres (130 ft) in diameter, and two new and complex wing structures. The centre has a mall, a hypermarket, a food court, and a cinema. The site also includes an open-air carpark and an indoor carpark.

The entire structure has four floors: the basement, which contains the carpark and leisure areas; the ground floor, which contains department stores, the Hypermarket, and retail stores; the first floor, which contains retail stores, leisure areas, and cinemas; and the second floor, which contains more retail shops and cinemas, as well as a bowling alley, a fitness centre and a food court.

On August 29, 2009, a tribute to Michael Jackson was given at Plaza Romania with many dancers. This would have been his 51st birthday.

On Nov 12, 2024, a Taco Bell opened in its food court, the fifth Taco Bell location in Bucharest.
