= București Mall =

Shopping mall in Bucharest, Romania

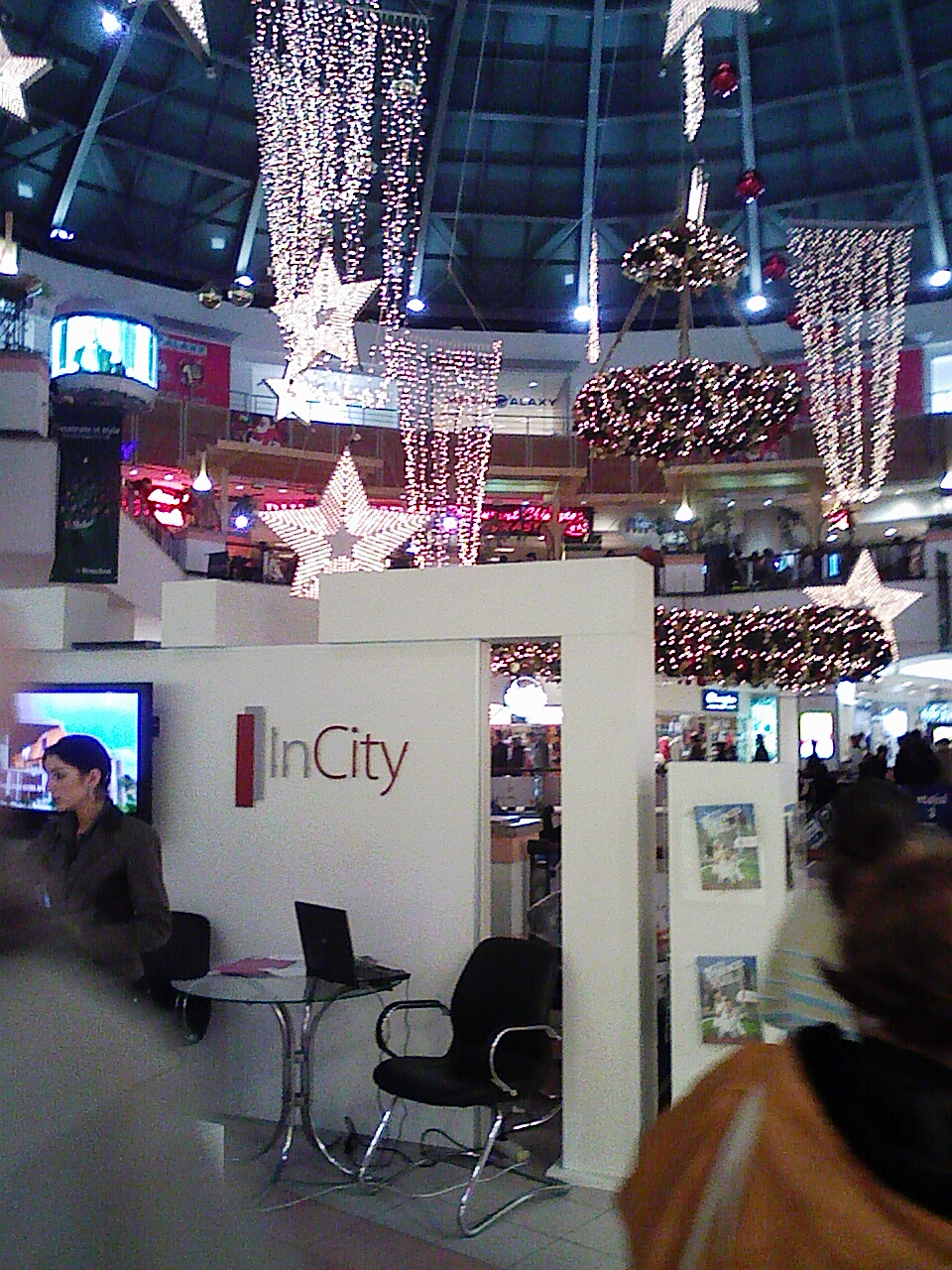
- Location: Bucharest, Romania
- Coordinates: 44°25′13.04″N 26°7′35.53″E
- Opened: September 1999
- Owner: Anchor Group
- Num. of stores: 140
- Floor area: 37,444 m^{2} (403,040 sq ft)
- Floors: 5
- Parking: 1,850 underground & deck
- Website: bucurestimall.ro

București Mall (known locally as Mall Vitan) is a shopping mall located in the Vitan neighborhood of Bucharest, Romania, close to the Dudești and Văcărești neighbourhoods. At the time of its completion it was the first shopping mall in Romania.

Located on Calea Vitan approximately 1 km (0.62 mi) outside Bucharest's historic center, the four-story, 50,000 m^{2} (540,000 sq ft) mall opened in 1999, in a Ceaușescu-era abandoned hunger circus, or giant food warehouse, in an area largely shaped during the Communist period (see Ceaușima).
