= STPT (transport operator) =

Romanian public transport operator

Societatea de Transport Public Timișoara SA
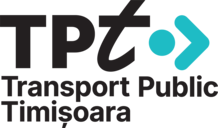
- Predecessor: Regia Autonomă de Transport Timișoara SA
- Founded: 1869
- Headquarters: Timișoara, Romania
- Key people: Florin Petolea (chief executive)
- Services: Bus; Trolleybus; Tram; Waterbus; Bike-sharing
- Net income: RON 71,188,084 (2023)
- Owner: Timișoara City Hall
- Number of employees: 1,058 (2023)
- Website: www.stpt.ro

Societatea de Transport Public Timișoara SA, commonly abbreviated STPT, is the primary public transport operator in the city of Timișoara. STPT is owned by the city and covers the entire urban public transport; it operates the tram (9 lines), the trolleybus (6 lines), the urban bus transport (12 lines + 8 express routes and 26 metropolitan routes), the waterbus public transport on the Bega Canal and the VeloTM bicycle-sharing system. 90 million passengers are transported annually, of which 52 million by tram.

== Timeline ==
- 1869 – The first horse-drawn tram in Timișoara is inaugurated on 8 July, running between Cetate and Fabric; in October, the network is extended to Iosefin.
- 1890 – The network spans 6.636 km, and the trams carry more than 711,000 passengers annually.
- 1899 – 27 July marks the first day of electric tram operation in Timișoara. The first generation of electric trams in Timișoara consisted of Type A cars.
- 1904 – The company is transferred to the administration of the Communal Council under the name Timișoara Communal Trams.
- 1920 – The foundations for tram production in the company's own workshops are laid.
- 1939 – The Timișoara Electromechanical Company is established.
- 1943 – The first bus routes appear in Timișoara.
- 1948 – The Timișoara Transport Company is established.
- 1971 – The Mixed Tram-Trolleybus Operations Depot on Dâmbovița Boulevard–Ion Barac Street is put into operation.
- 1977 – Tram production is transferred to the Electrometal company.
- 1979 – Public transportation is transferred to the Timiș County Local Transport Company.
- 1986 – The trolleybus depot on Banatul Street is put into operation.
- 1990 – The Timișoara Autonomous Transport Authority is established.
- 2015 – The bike-sharing system is inaugurated with 25 stations and 300 bicycles.
- 2016 – Seven waterbuses are purchased for transportation on the Bega Canal.
- 2017 – Following a reorganization, the transport authority is transformed into the Timișoara Public Transport Company.

== STPT lines ==
As of 2026

=== Bus routes ===
==== Urban buses ====
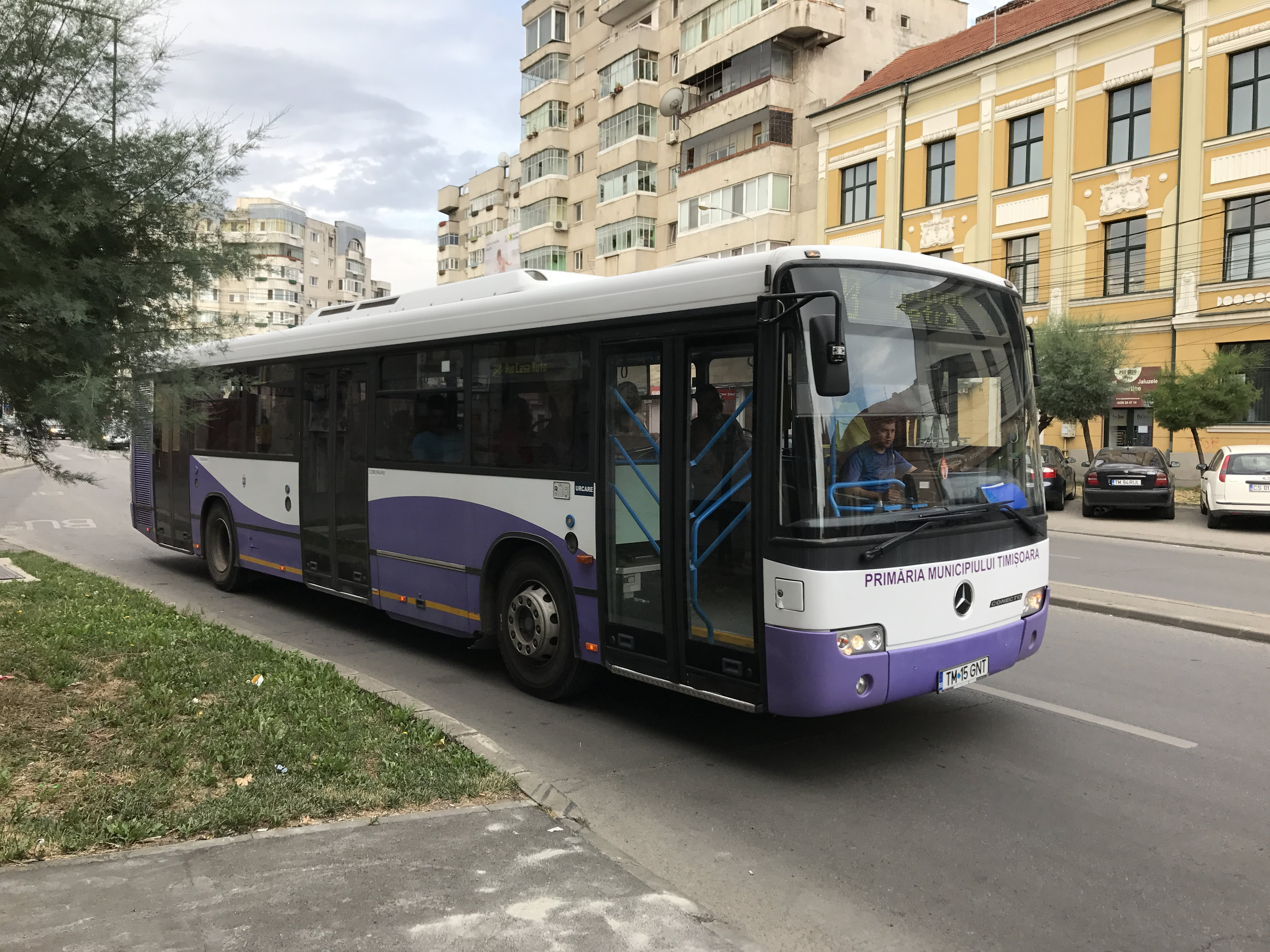
Mercedes-Benz Conecto C bus on route 33b

- Line 5b: King Charles I – Bârzava
- Line 5c: Ronaț – East Station
- Line 13: Military Hospital – Railroad Passage
- Line 21: Traian Grozăvescu – Plopi School
- Line 23: Banatim – East Station
- Line 24: Hornbach (Buziașului) – Rudicica
- Line 28: Bastion – Gheorghe Țițeica
- Line 32: Cathedral – South Station
- Line 33: Cathedral – Șagului Overpass
- Line 33b: Cathedral – Incontro Industrial Park
- Line 40: Traian Grozăvescu – Stuparilor
- Line 46: Bastion – Denya Forest
- Line E1: Șagului Overpass – Tristan Tzara
- Line E2: Aumovio – Holdelor
- Line E3: Apicultorilor – ELBA
- Line E4: Bastion – Airport
- Line E4b: Gheorghe Barițiu – Airport
- Line E6: Oituz – PITT
- Line E7: Traian Grozăvescu – Comtim
- Line E8: Șagului Overpass – Albăstrelelor

==== Metropolitan buses ====
- Line M3: Timișoara – Giroc
- Line M11: Timișoara – Ghiroda
- Line M14: Timișoara – Dumbrăvița
- Line M22: Timișoara – Moșnița Veche
- Line M23: Timișoara – Urseni
- Line M24: Timișoara – Albina
- Line M27: Timișoara – Ianova
- Line M29: Timișoara – Ghiroda
- Line M30: Bastion – Ghiroda
- Line M32: Timișoara – Chișoda – Giroc
- Line M35: Timișoara – Giarmata-Vii
- Line M36: Timișoara – Sânmihaiu German
- Line M37: Timișoara – Parța
- Line M38: Timișoara – Jebel
- Line M39: Timișoara – Cruceni
- Line M41: Timișoara – Carani
- Line M42: Timișoara – Covaci
- Line M43: Timișoara – Beregsău Mic
- Line M44: Timișoara – Dudeștii Noi
- Line M45: Timișoara – Dumbrăvița
- Line M46: Timișoara – Șag
- Line M47: Timișoara – Hodoni
- Line M48: Timișoara – Seceani
- Line M49: Timișoara – Giarmata
- Line M50: Timișoara – Uihei
- Line M51: Timișoara – Pădureni

==== School buses ====
- Line S1: Tristan Tzara – high schools
- Line S2: Șagului Overpass – high schools
- Line S2b: British School – Șagului Overpass
- Line S3: Urseni – high schools
- Line S4: Stuparilor – high schools
- Line S7: University of Life Sciences – high schools
- Line S8: Comtim – Banat College
- Line S9: Șagului – Vlad the Impaler
- Line S10: Ronaț – high schools
- Line S11: Stuparilor – high schools
- Line S12: Ghiroda – high schools
- Line S13: Airport District – high schools
- Line S14: Magnoliei – high schools
- Line S14b: British School – Magnoliei
- Line S15: Balta Verde – Lorena

=== Trolleybus routes ===
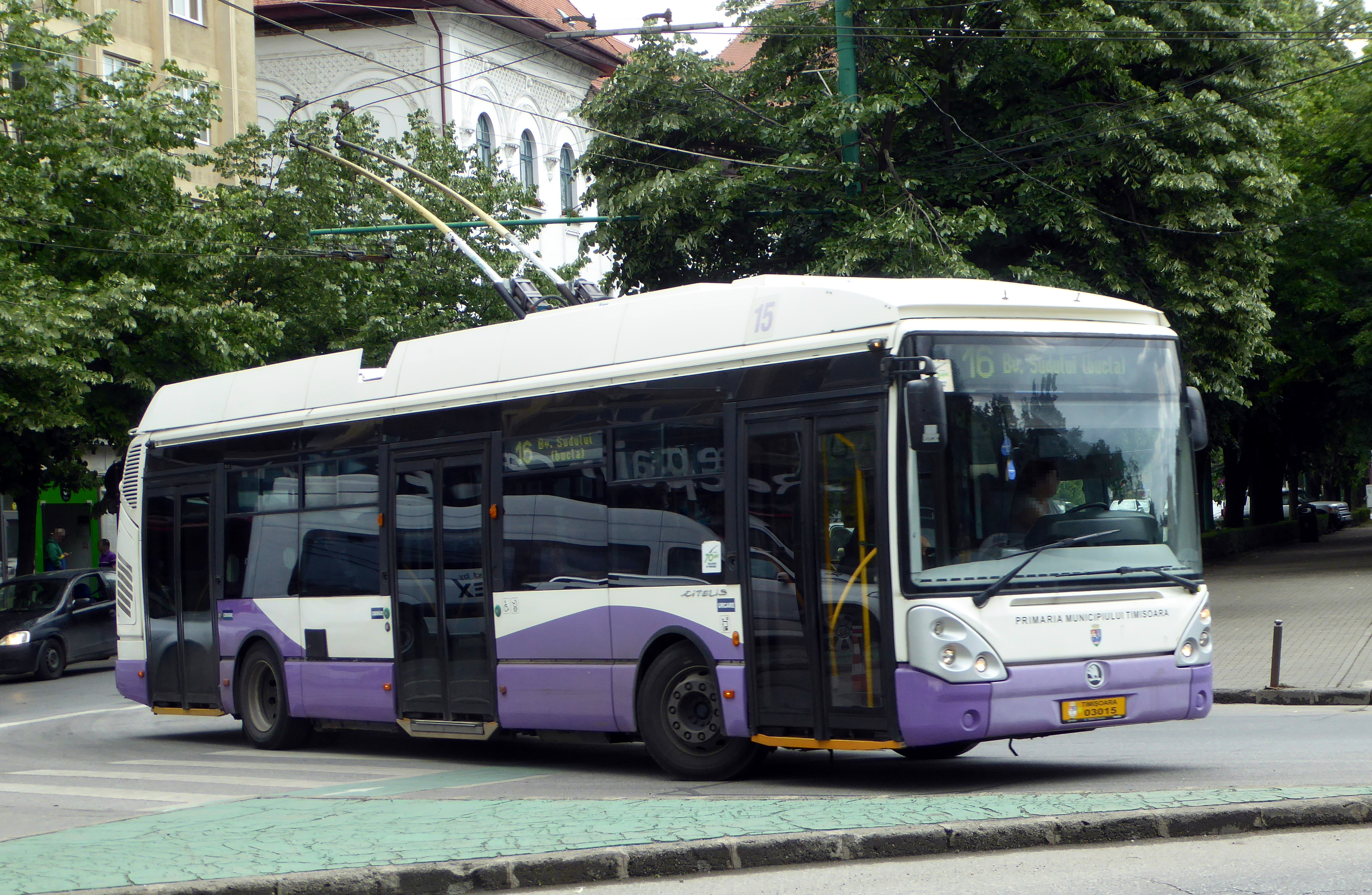
Škoda 24Tr Irisbus trolleybus on route 16

- Line 11: Gheorghe Barițiu – Arena AquaSport
- Line 14: Gheorghe Barițiu – Ion Ionescu de la Brad
- Line 15: Sudului Roundabout – Traian Grozăvescu
- Line 16: Sudului Roundabout – Traian Grozăvescu
- Line 17: Arena AquaSport – University of Life Sciences
- Line 18: Gheorghe Barițiu – University of Life Sciences

=== Tram routes ===
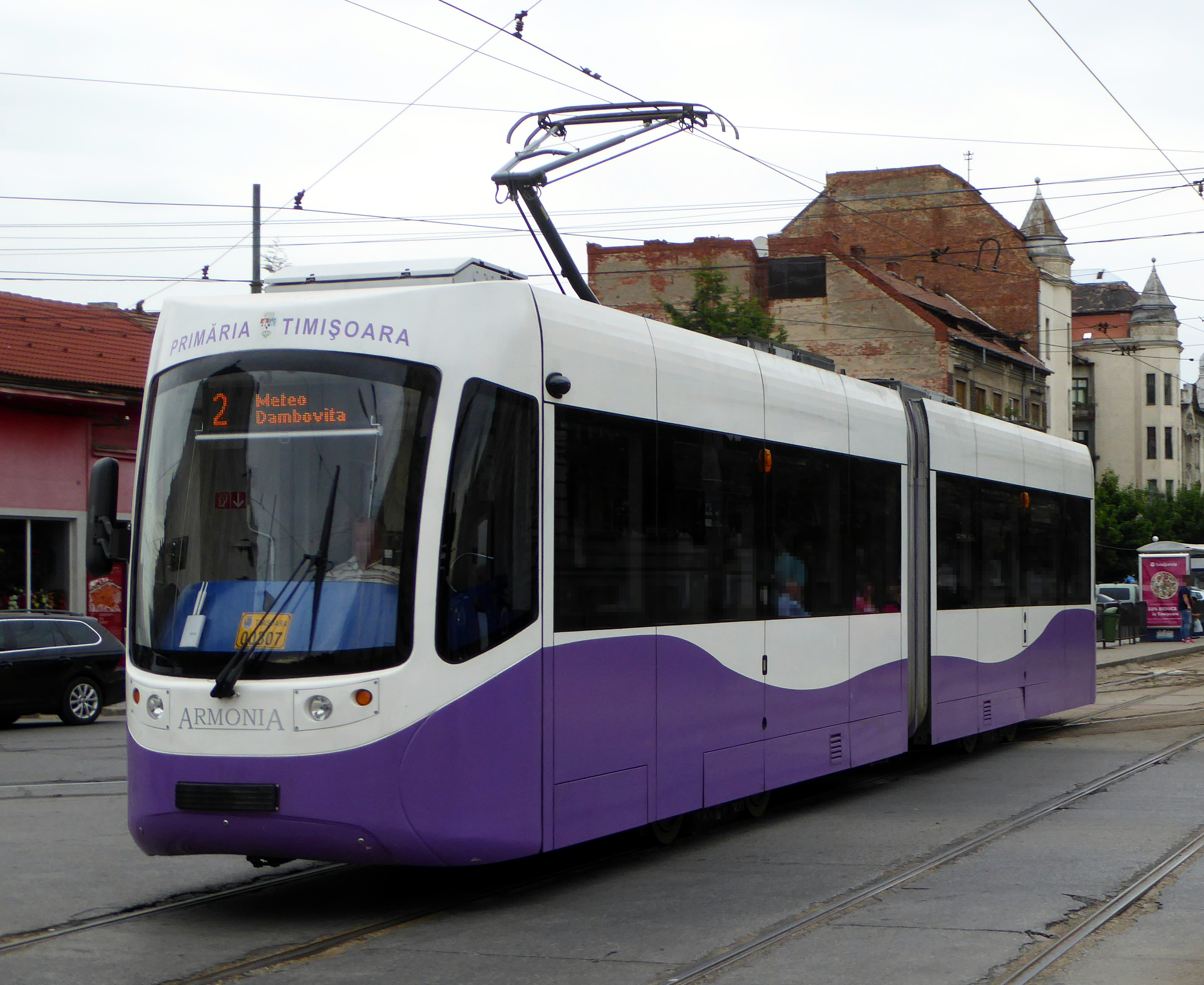
GT4MT Armonia tram on route 2

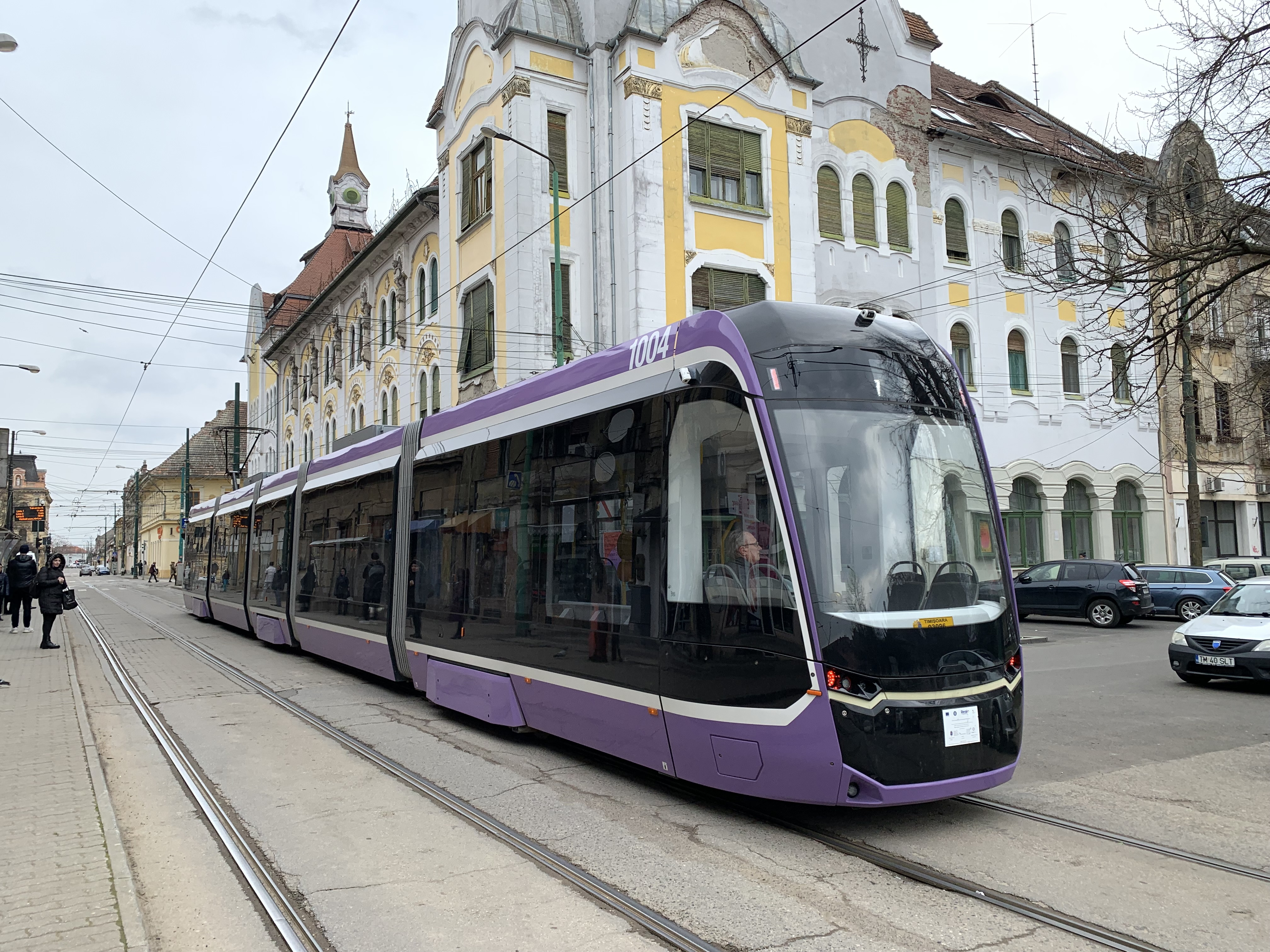
GT6 Bozankaya on route 6a

- Line 1: North Station – AEM
- Line 2: Shopping City – Torontalului
- Line 4: Torontalului – AEM
- Line 5: Ronaț – East Station
- Line 6a: St. Mary Square – Banatim
- Line 6b: St. Mary Square – Banatim
- Line 7: Dâmbovița – Torontalului
- Line 8: North Station – AEM
- Line 9: North Station – AEM

=== Waterbus routes ===
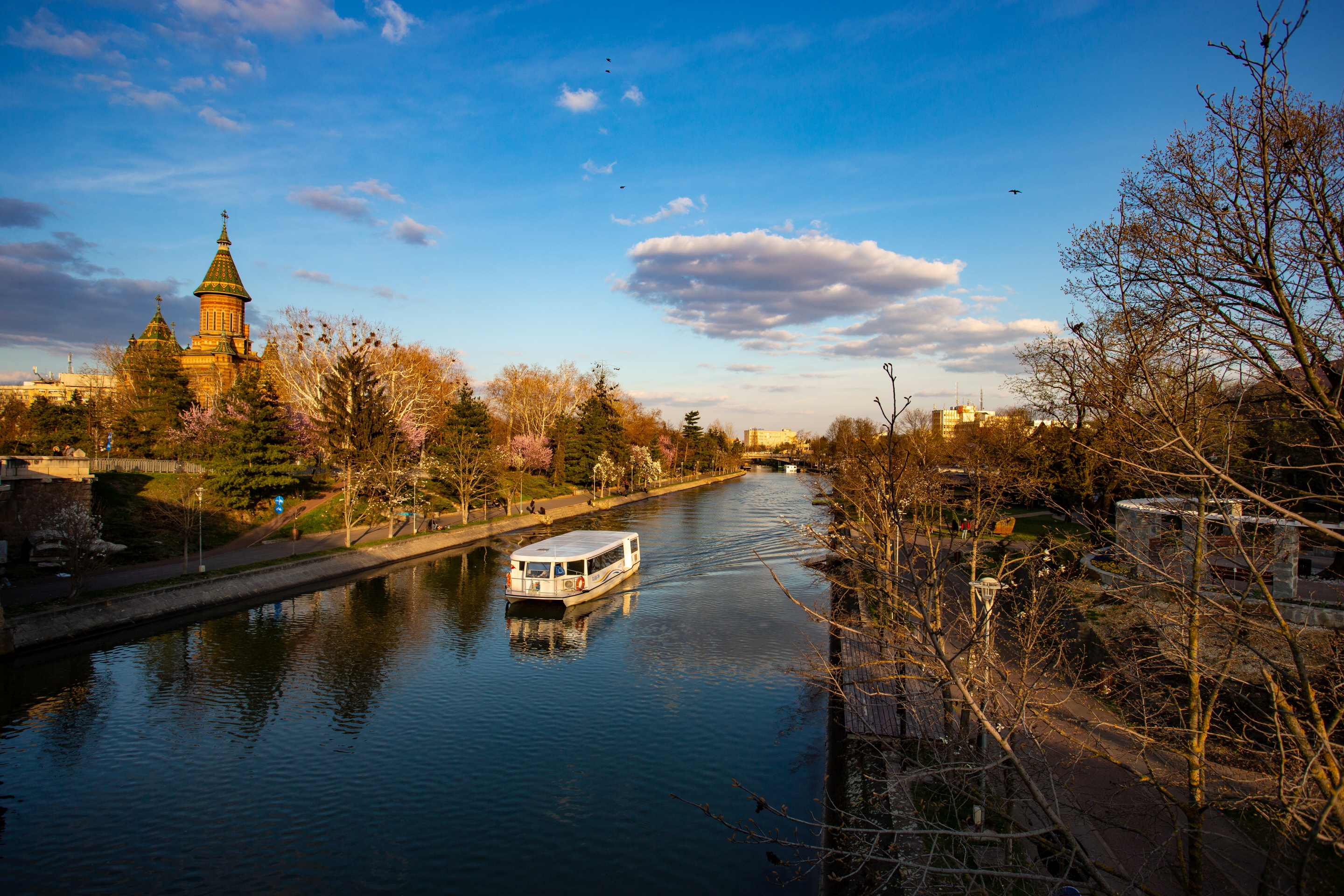
The waterbus public transport in Timișoara

- Line V1: Michael the Brave – Ardealul

== Fleet ==
The fleet consists of:

- Trams:
  - 54 Hansa GT4 (acquired second-hand from Bremen);
  - 30 GT4MT Armonia (rebuilt GT4 by Astra Arad and Electroputere Pașcani);
  - 40 Bozankaya low-floor trams (23 purple, 17 yellow);
- Trolleybuses:
  - 50 Škoda 24Tr Irisbus (rigid);
  - 25 Bozankaya SNG 18T Lamis (articulated);
  - 8 Bozankaya SNG 12T Lamis (rigid);
- Buses:
  - 55 Mercedes-Benz Conecto C (rigid);
  - 30 Mercedes-Benz Conecto G (articulated);
  - 56 Karsan e-ATA 18 (articulated);
  - 30 Karsan e-ATA 10 (rigid);
- Other:
  - 21 Cibro minibuses;
  - 7 waterbuses, constructed by Spat Yard Galați.

== Ticketing system ==
A variety of payment methods are available for purchasing travel tickets, including contactless bank cards, SMS payments, tickets and passes purchased at STPT sales points, and an electronic wallet system, in which a ticket is loaded onto a contactless card. Tickets and passes can also be purchased online through the 24pay and mobilPay apps.

A single ticket costs 5 lei and is valid for 60 minutes. A 30-day pass valid on a single route costs 120 lei. Tickets and passes are subject to occasional inspections by ticket inspectors. Passengers found without a valid ticket are subject to an on-the-spot fine of 200 lei.

== See also ==
- List of bus operating companies
- List of trolleybus systems
- List of tram and light rail transit systems
- List of town tramway systems in Romania
