= STPT =

STPT may refer to:

- Postal Service and Telecommunications Surveillance, a Swiss intelligence agency abbreviated "STPT" in the Romansh language.
- Societatea de Transport Public Timișoara, the primary public transport operator in the Romanian city of Timișoara, commonly abbreviated "STPT".
