= Timișoara South railway station =

Railway station in Romania

Timișoara Sud
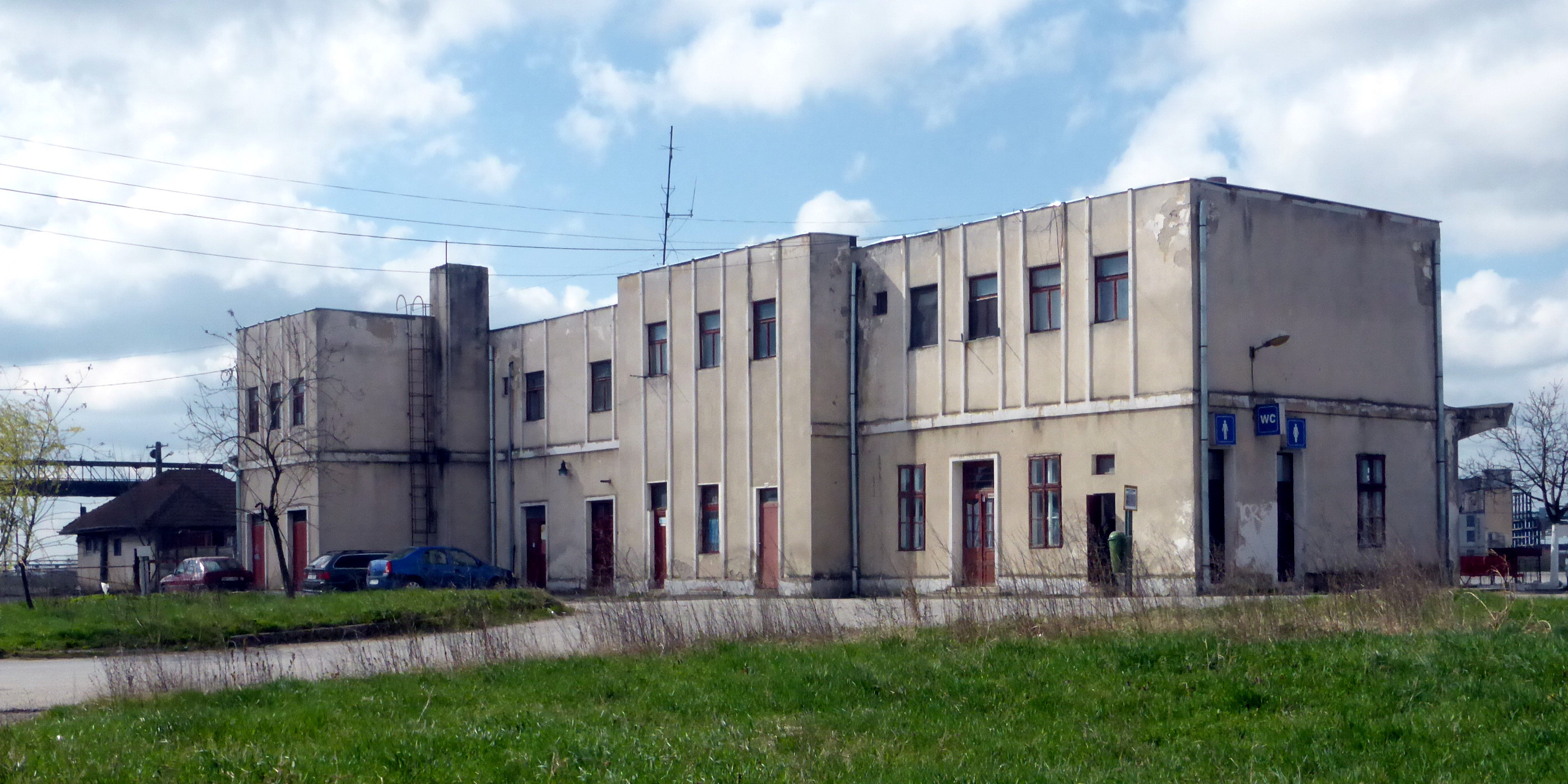

General information
- Location: 8 Ceferiștilor Street, Timișoara; Romania
- Coordinates: 45°42′58″N 21°12′11″E
- Owner: Căile Ferate Române
- Lines: CFR Line 922 (Timișoara–Stamora Moravița); CFR Line 918 (Timișoara–Buziaș–Lugoj)
- Train operators: Regio Călători; CFR Călători
Location

Timișoara South railway station is a station located in Fratelia district of Timișoara. Crossed by the CFR Lines 922 (Timișoara–Stamora Moravița) and 918 (Timișoara–Buziaș–Lugoj), the station is transited daily by 27 trains operated by Regio Călători and CFR Călători. The station has 10 lines. Timișoara South was built during communism to decongest Timișoara North railway station, especially after the construction of the Azur industrial line.
