= Public water transport in Timișoara =

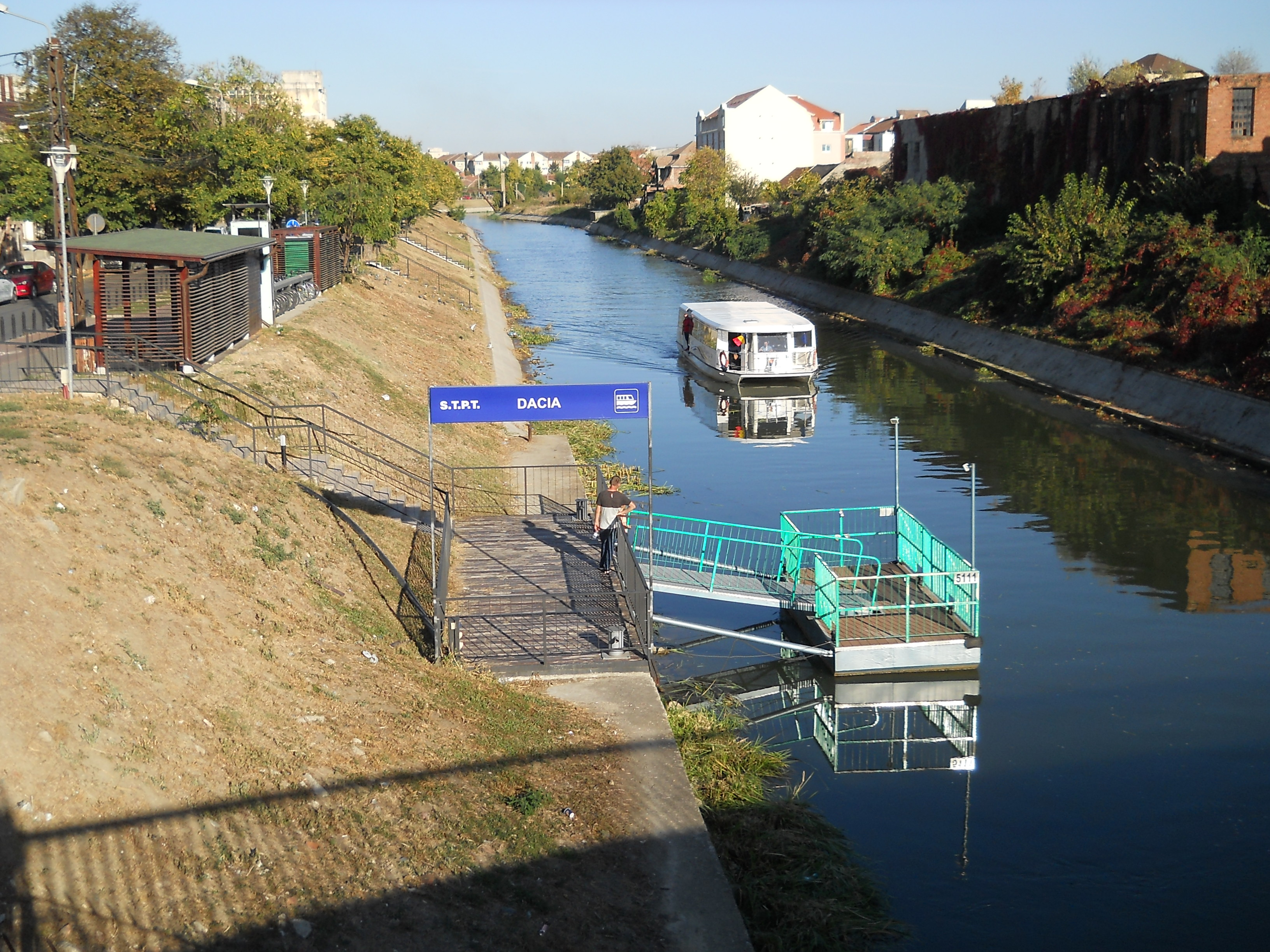
A vaporetto is shown approaching the Dacia stop, heading downstream.

The public water transport with waterbuses (colloquially named vaporetto (sing.) or vaporașe ("little ships")) is the newest public transport subsystem in Timișoara, being delivered by the local public transportation authority (Societatea de Transport Public Timișoara) and it stretches on almost 7 km of the Bega Canal. The inaugural route took place in the morning of October 4, 2018.

== Line V1 ==
There is only one waterbus route (line V1), having nine stops along the Bega Canal, from the Modoș Bridge (downstream) to the Mihai Viteazul Bridge (upstream). The stations are equipped with a covered waiting space, with an upper waiting platform and a floating dock.

As of 2018 (autumn season), the line was served by two or three vessels. Upstream, the route takes about 64 minutes, and downstream, 50 minutes. A waterbus can take on board up to as much as 50 passengers, and the crew is composed of at least 2 sailors.

=== Schedule ===
The hydrobuses navigate as a public transport means from Mondays through Fridays, and in weekends they navigate for leisure, with embarkment and debarkation at the Catedrala Mitropolitană stop.

The schedules can be found at downstream and upstream directions.

In 2018, the waterbuses navigated until December 8, after that being brought to a depot until the end of the winter.

== The stations ==
The stations are covered, having four benches, an upper waiting platform which is connected to the floating dock by a metallic gangway. Each of the stations has also a cabin which can be used for various purposes.

Each station has also a bicycle rack of the local public transport authority.

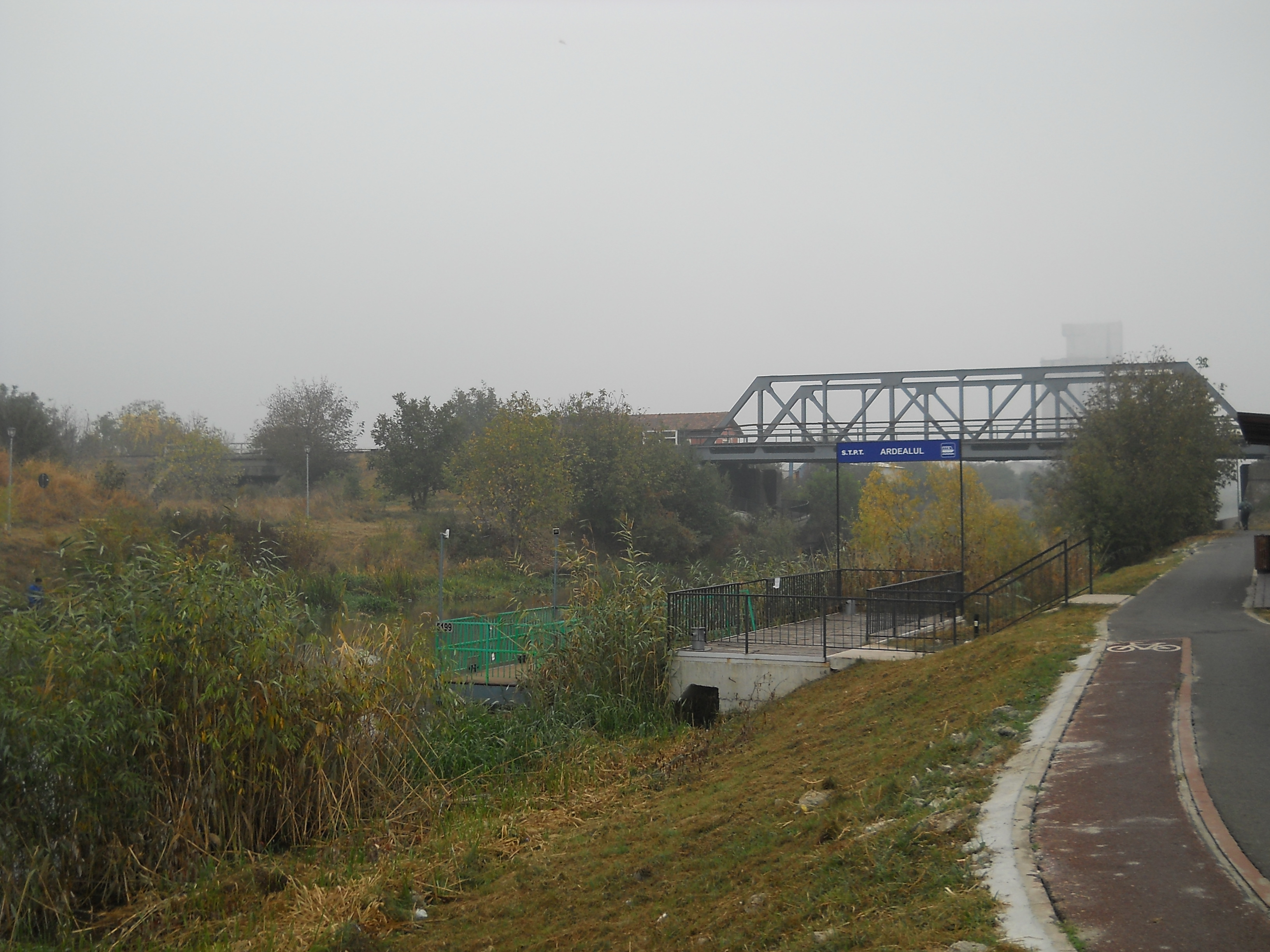
The Ardealul vaporetto station, with the Modoș Rail Bridge in the background

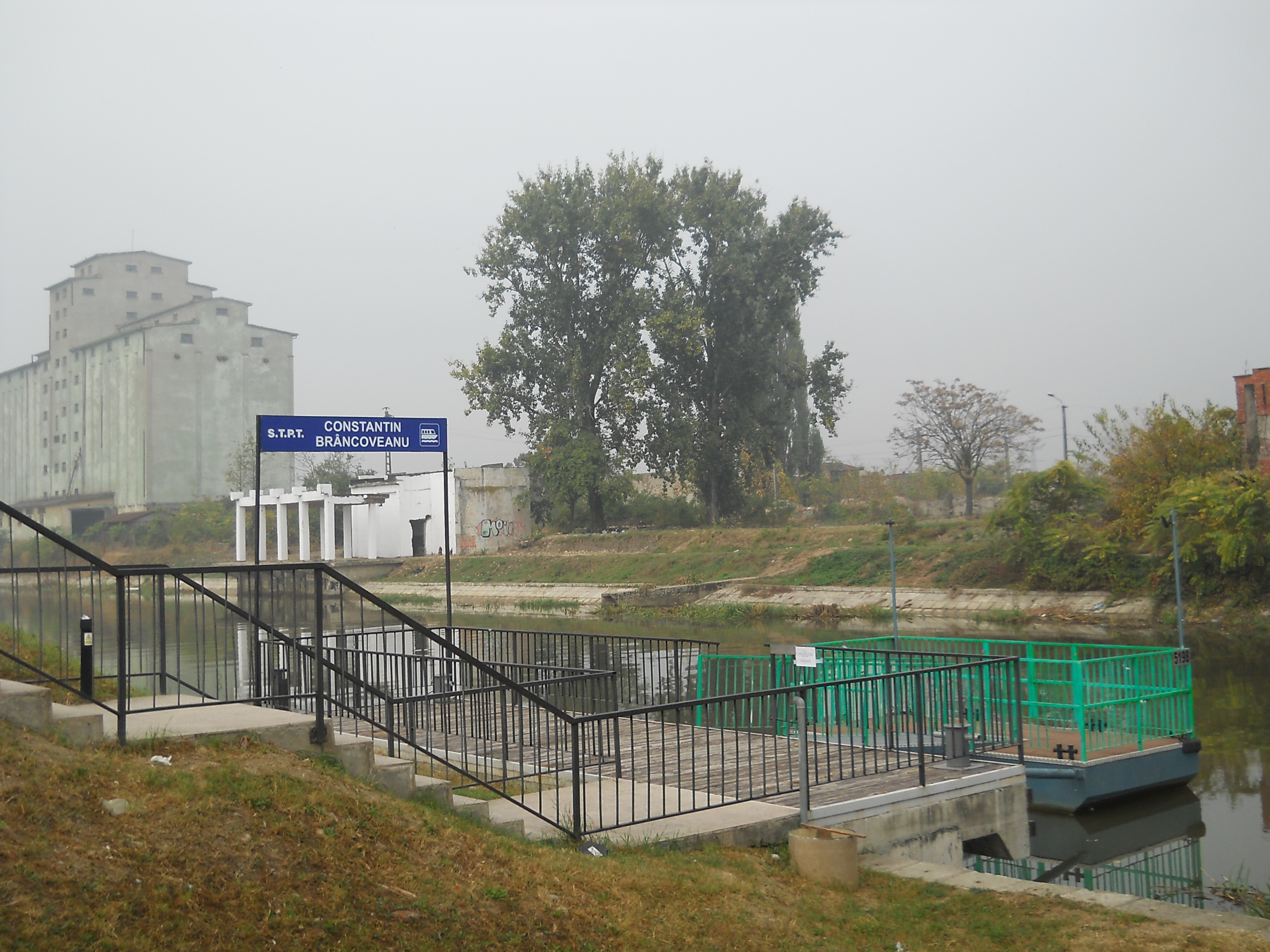
The Constantin Brâncoveanu station (waiting upper platform and the floating dock)

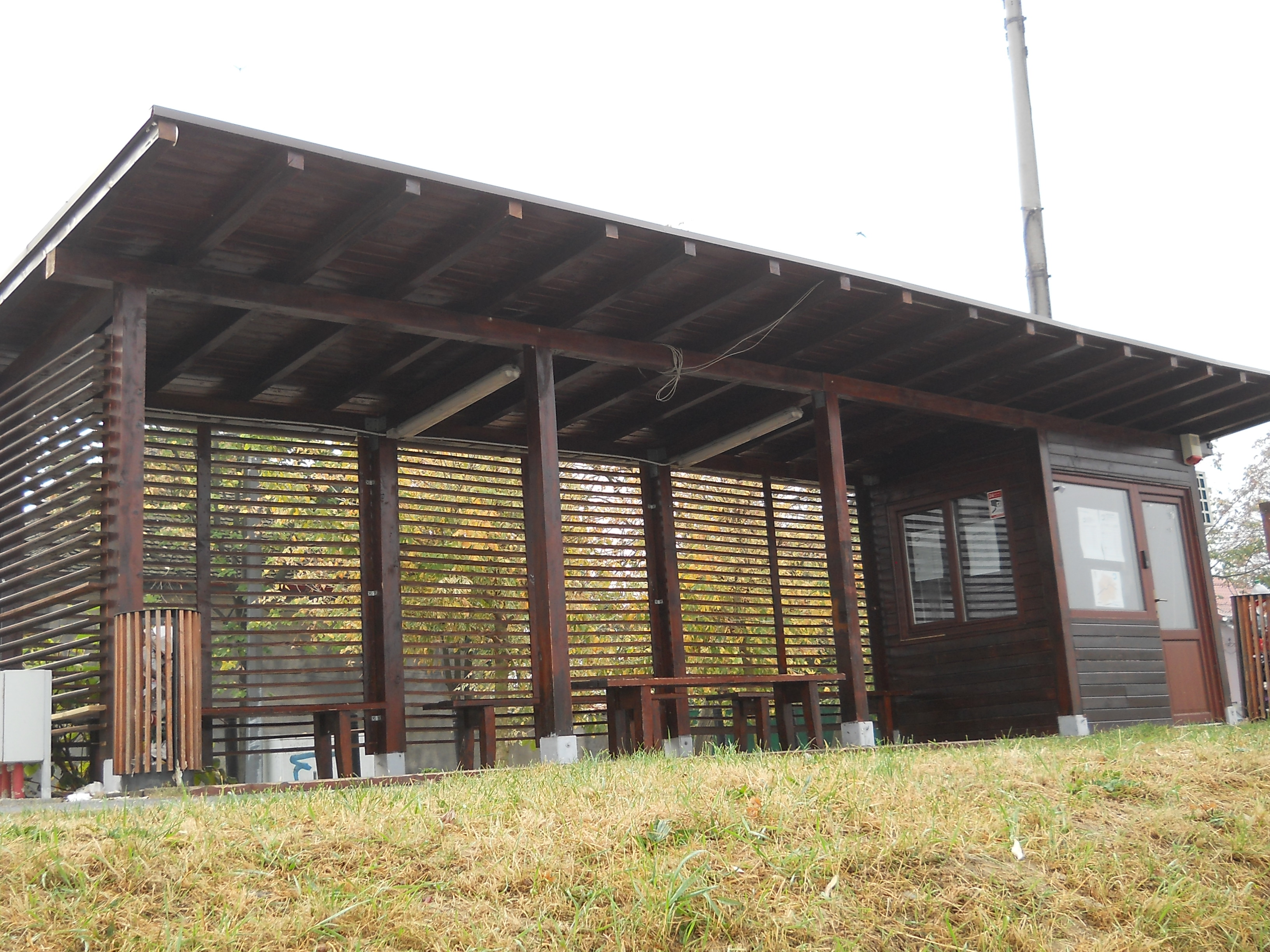
The covered waiting space of the Constantin Brâncoveanu station

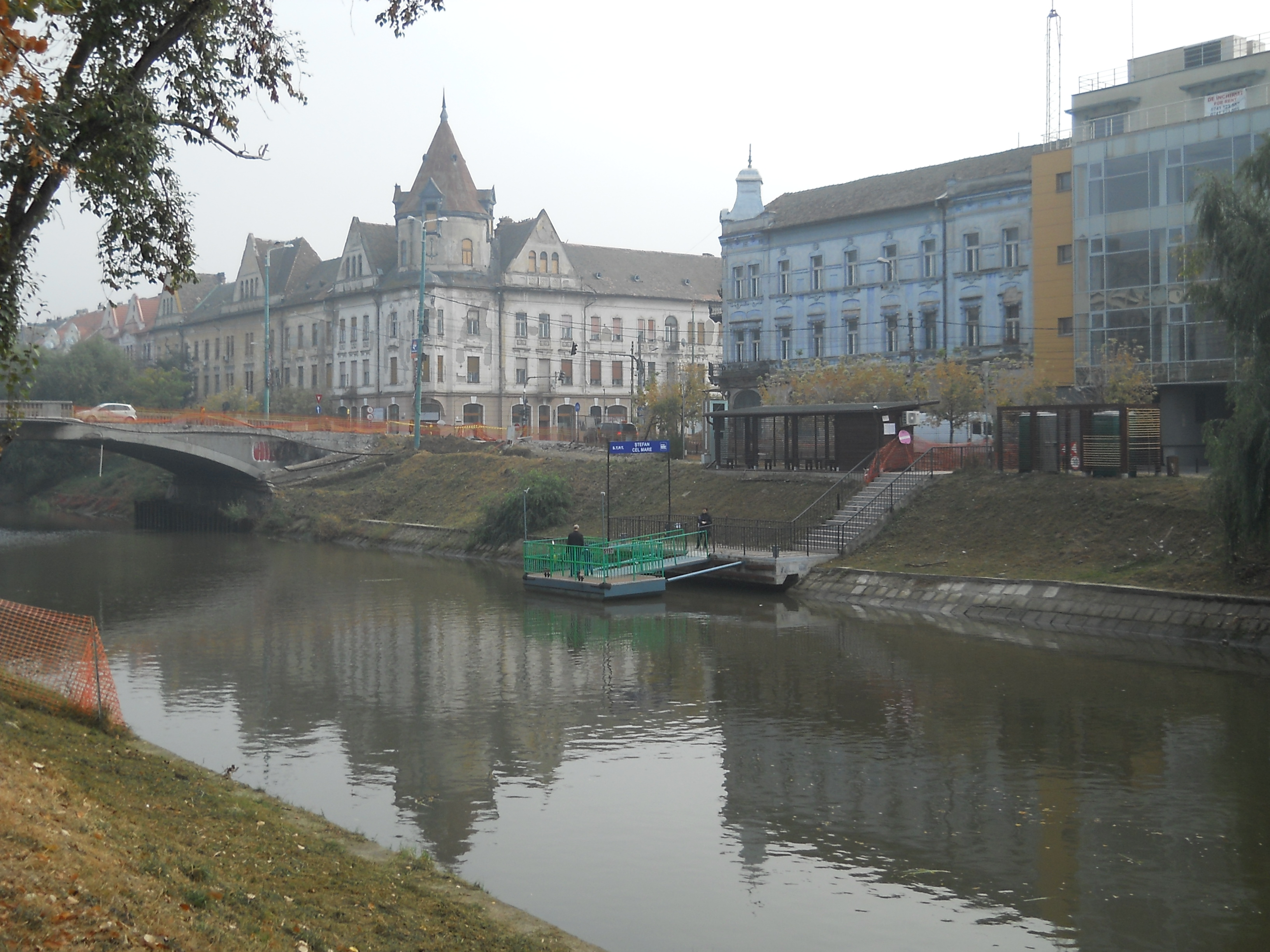
The Ștefan cel Mare station, with the Ancora palace in the background

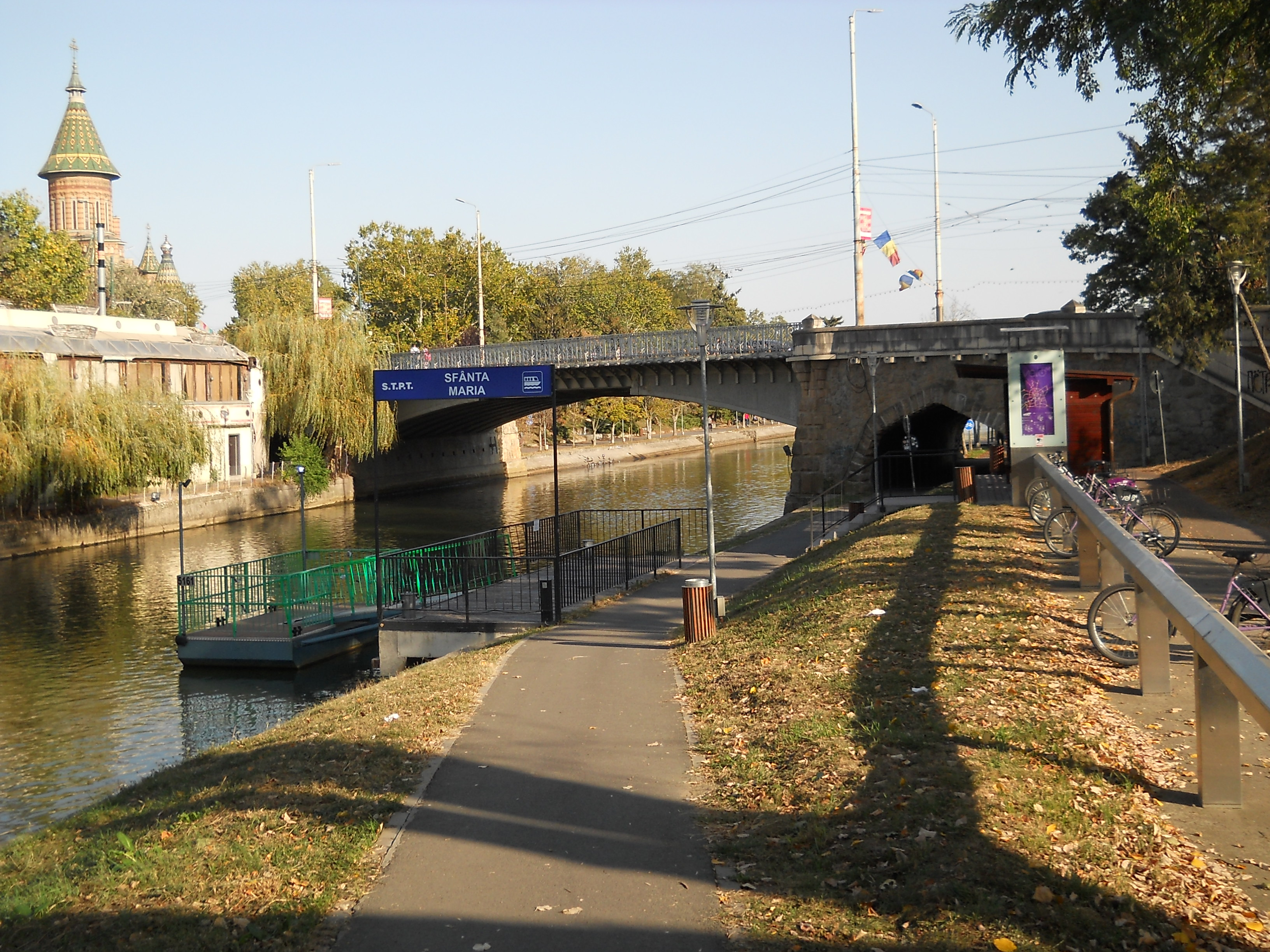
Sfânta Maria station. The Metropolitan Cathedral can be seen in the far background

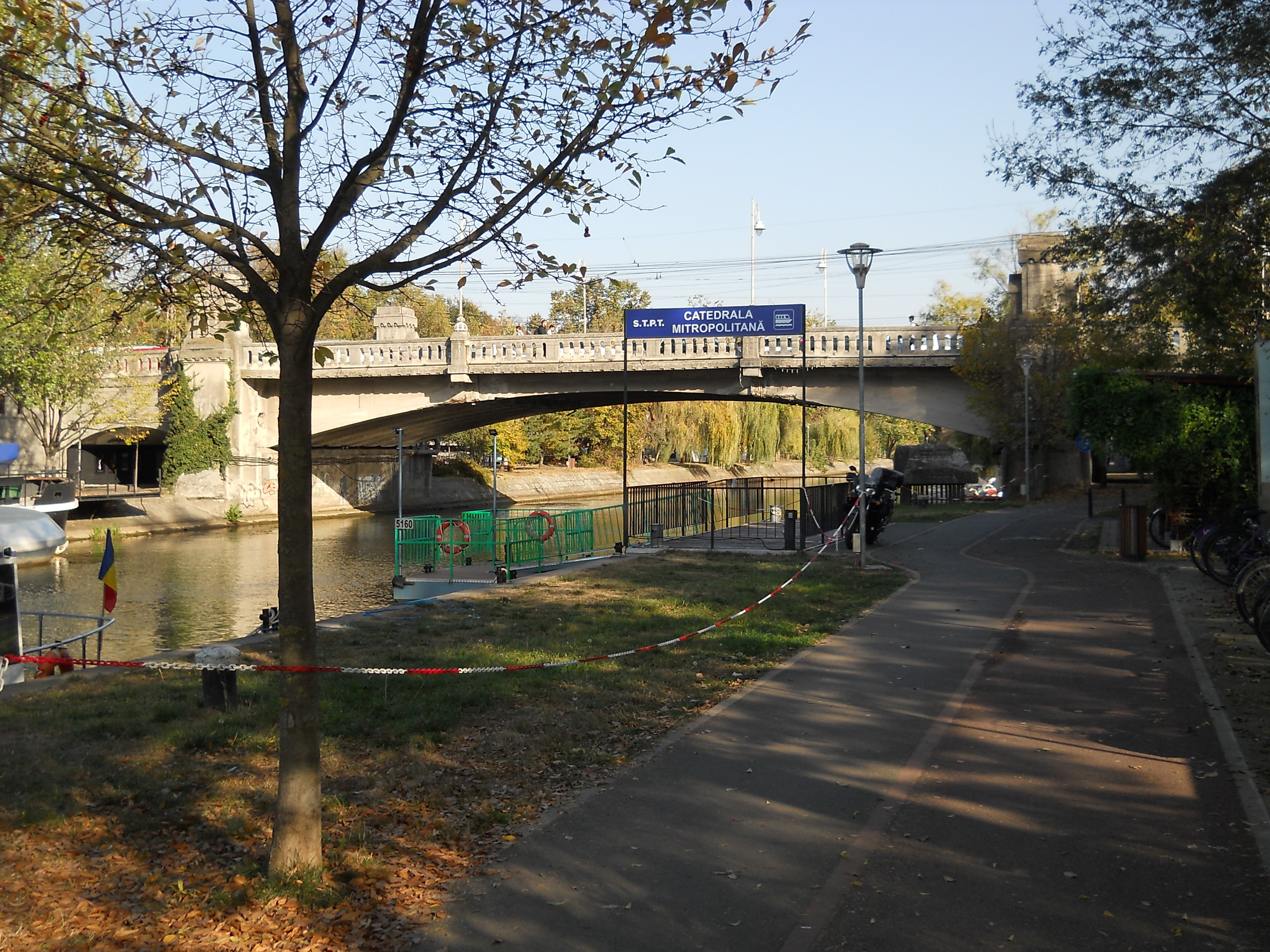
The Catedrala Mitropolitană station

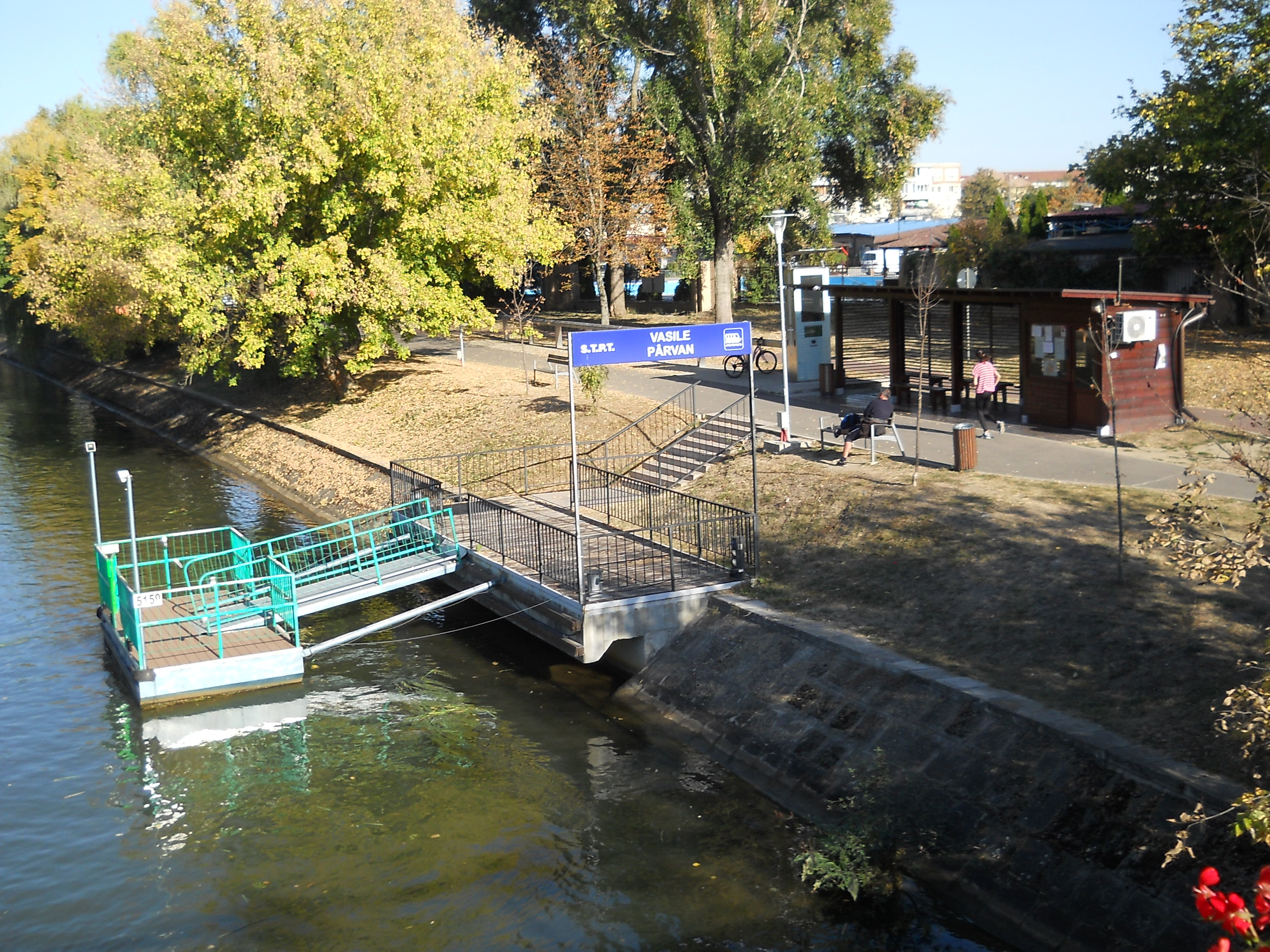
The Vasile Pârvan stop, seen from upon the Michelangelo Bridge

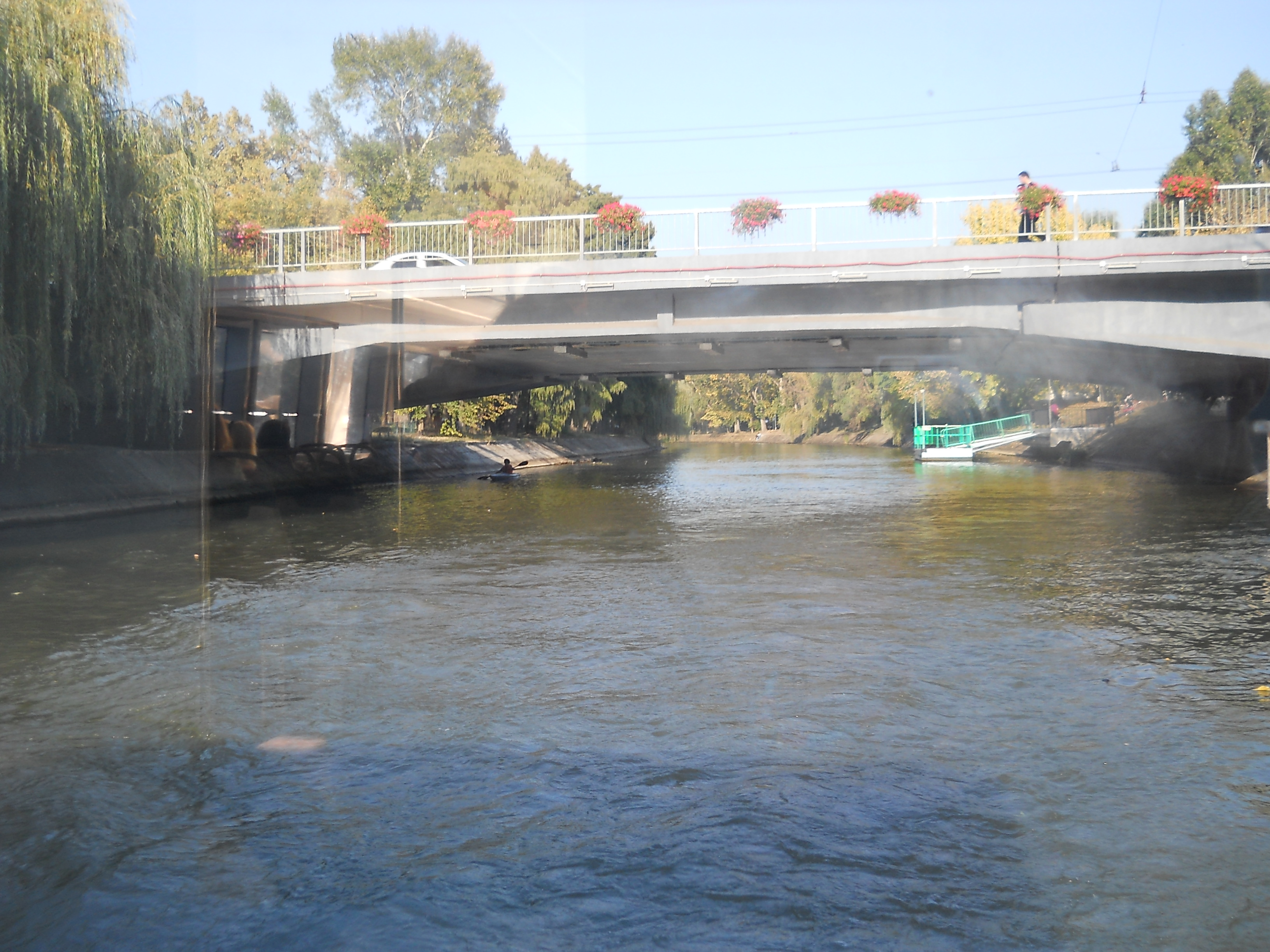
The Vasile Pârvan station, seen from the inside of a waterbus

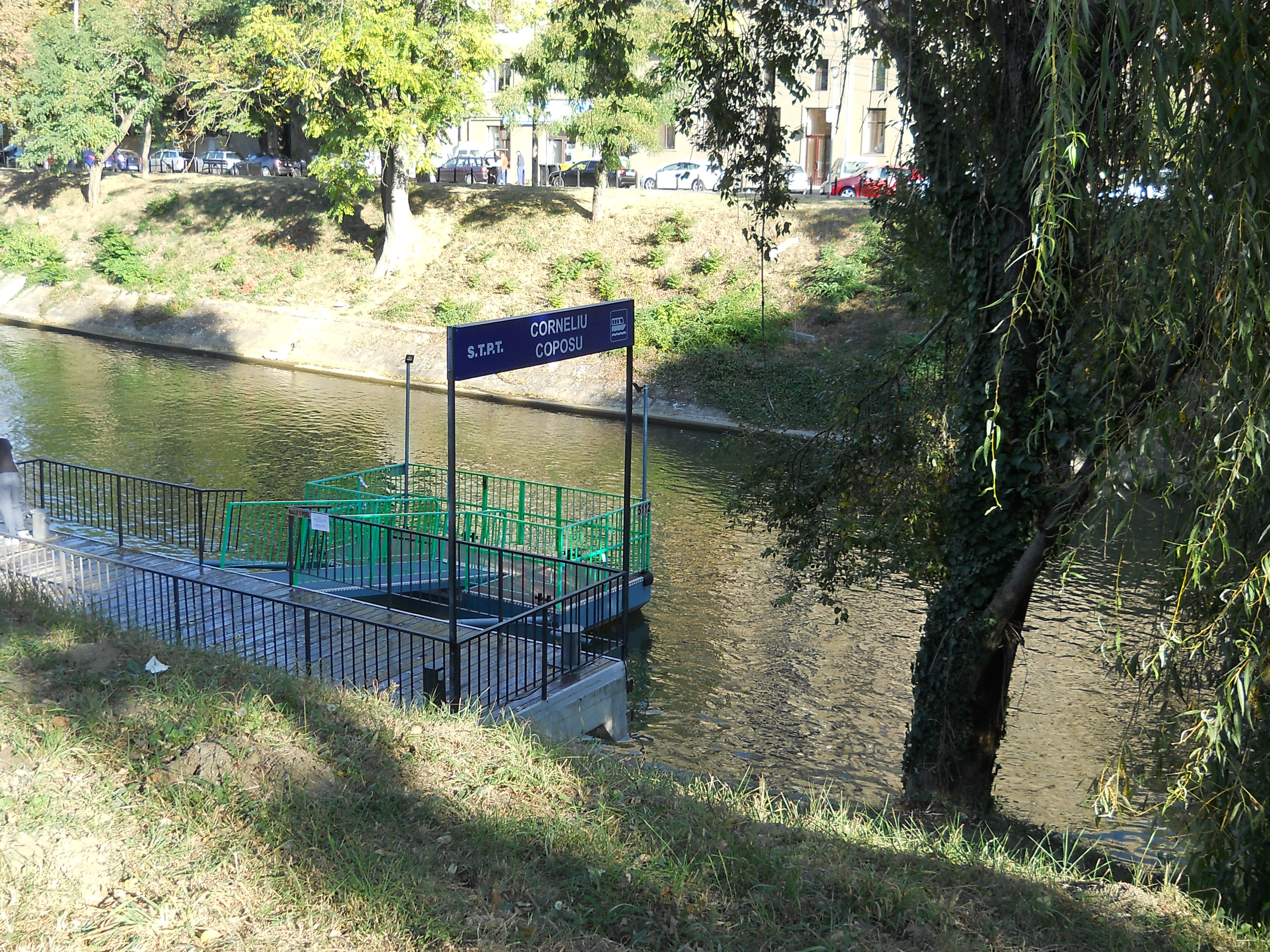
The Corneliu Coposu station

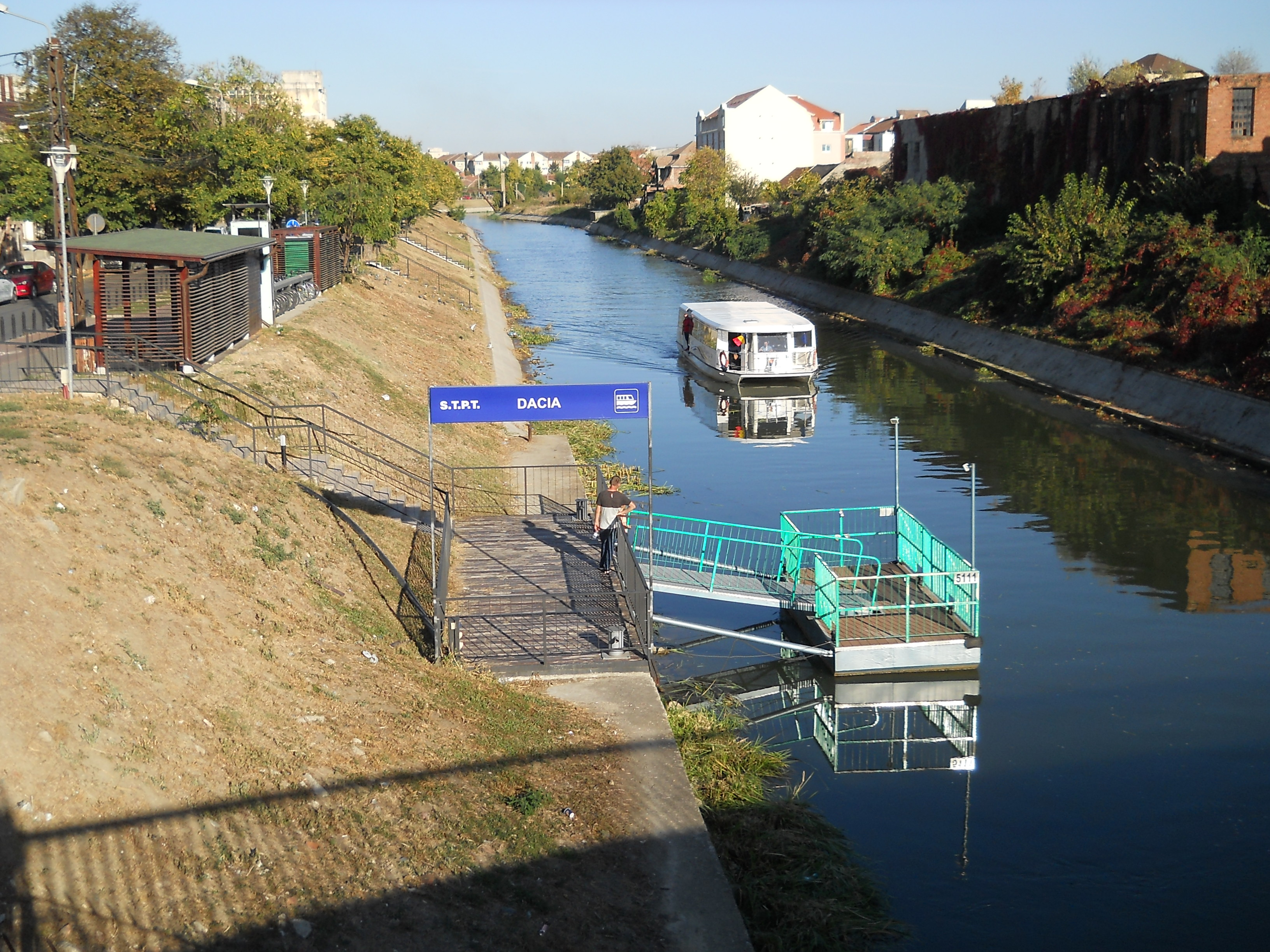
The Dacia station with a waterbus on the downstream direction, preparing to moor to the floating dock

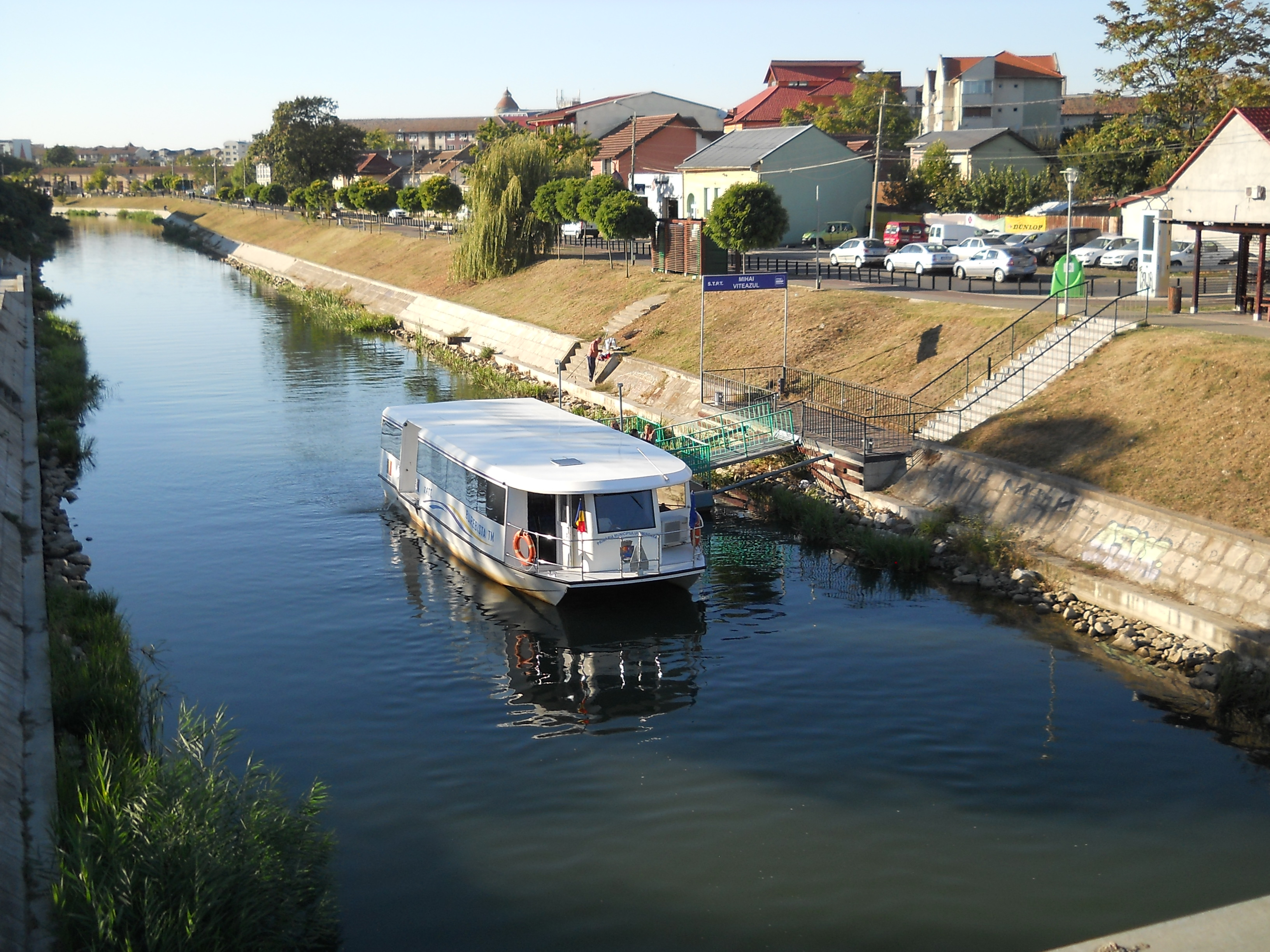
The Mihai Viteazu station, with a waterbus on the upstream direction (this is the terminus station)

== See more ==
- Timișoara
- Public Transport in Timișoara
- Waterbus
