= Bozankaya =

Turkish rolling stock manufacturer

- Type: Anonim Şirket
- Industry: Transportation: Railways
- Founded: 1989
- Founder: Murat Bozankaya
- Headquarters: Ankara, Turkey
- Area served: Global
- Key people: CEO: Murat Bozankaya
- Products: Metros, Trams, Trolleybuses, Buses
- Parent: Bozankaya
- Website: https://www.bozankaya.com.tr/

Bozankaya is a Turkish manufacturer of rolling stock including metro, tram and trolleybus vehicles.

== History ==
The company was originally founded as BBC & C in Wolfenbüttel, Germany by Murat Bozankaya, in 1989. The company moved its headquarters to Ankara, Turkey in 2003.

== Customers ==
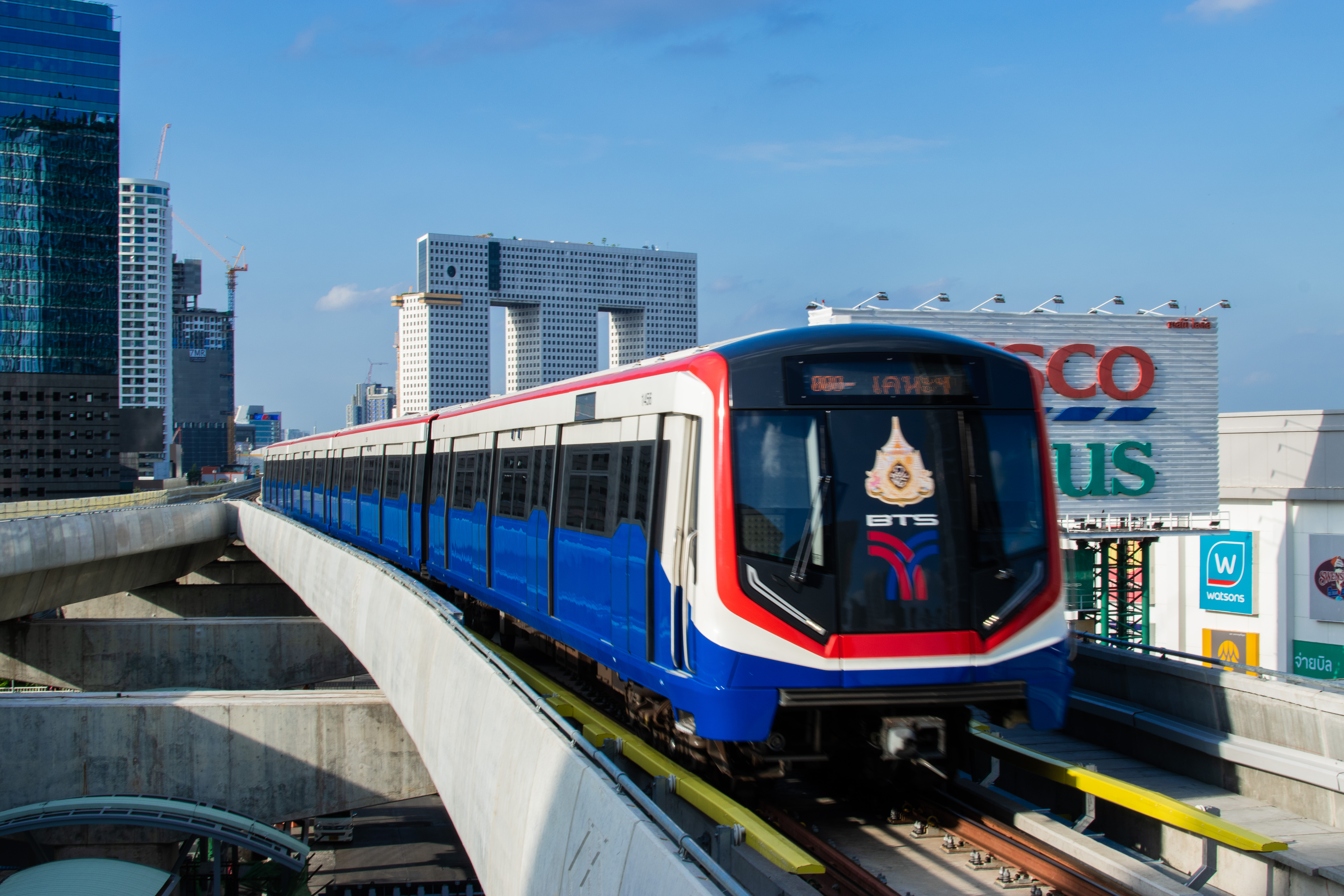
Siemens Inspiro train (EMU-A2) in Bangkok, Thailand

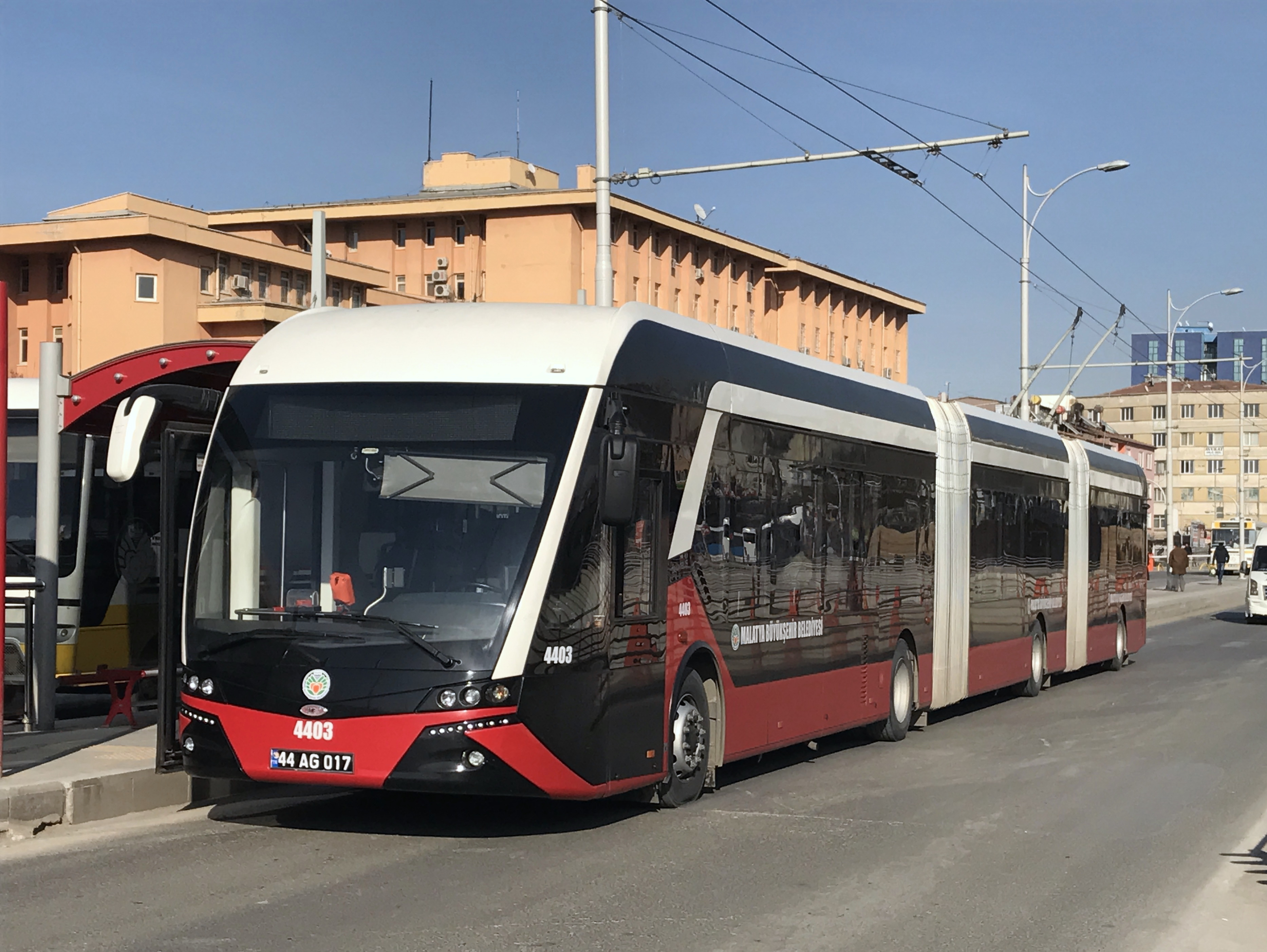
Bozankaya trolleybus in Malatya, Turkey

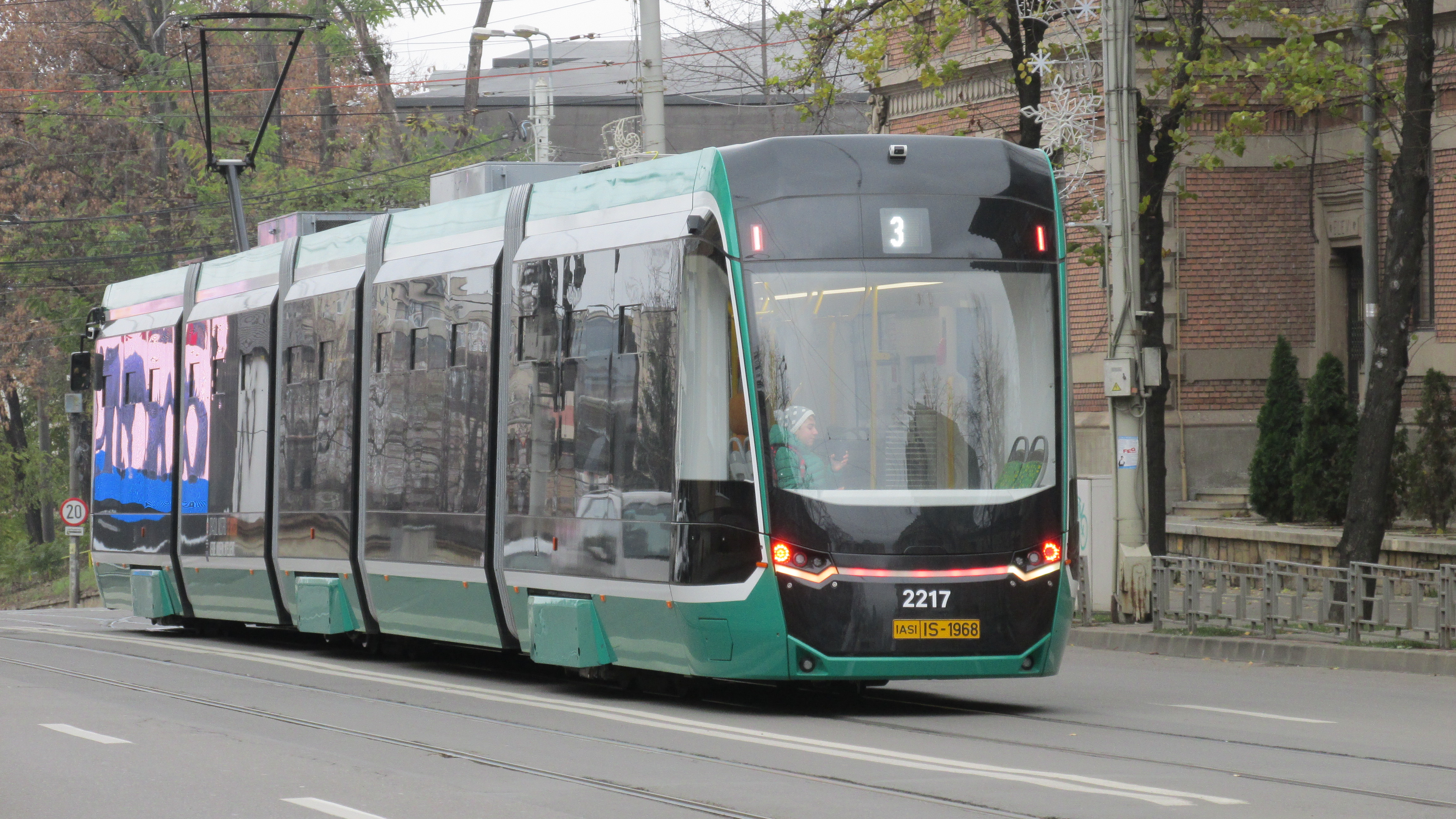
Bozankaya tram in Iași, Romania

=== Metros ===
- BTS Skytrain, Bangkok, Thailand — Siemens Inspiro (EMU-A2) trains in a joint venture with Siemens
- MRT Blue Line, Bangkok, Thailand — Siemens Inspiro (EMU-BLE#2) trains in a joint venture with Siemens
- MRT Orange Line, Bangkok, Thailand — Siemens Inspiro (EMU-IOL) trains in a joint venture with Siemens
- M4/M10 - Istanbul, Turkey
- Gebze Metro - Kocaeli, Turkey

=== Trams ===
- AntRay, Antalya, Turkey
- Kayseray, Kayseri, Turkey
- Akçaray, Kocaeli, Turkey
- SAMULAŞ, Samsun, Turkey
- CTP Iași, Iași, Romania
- STPT, Timișoara, Romania
- GSP Belgrade, Belgrade, Serbia
- ANM, Naples, Italy
- ZKM Elbląg, Elbląg, Poland

=== Trolleybuses ===
- Malatya, Turkey
- Şanlurfa, Turkey
- Timișoara, Romania
- Prague, Czechia

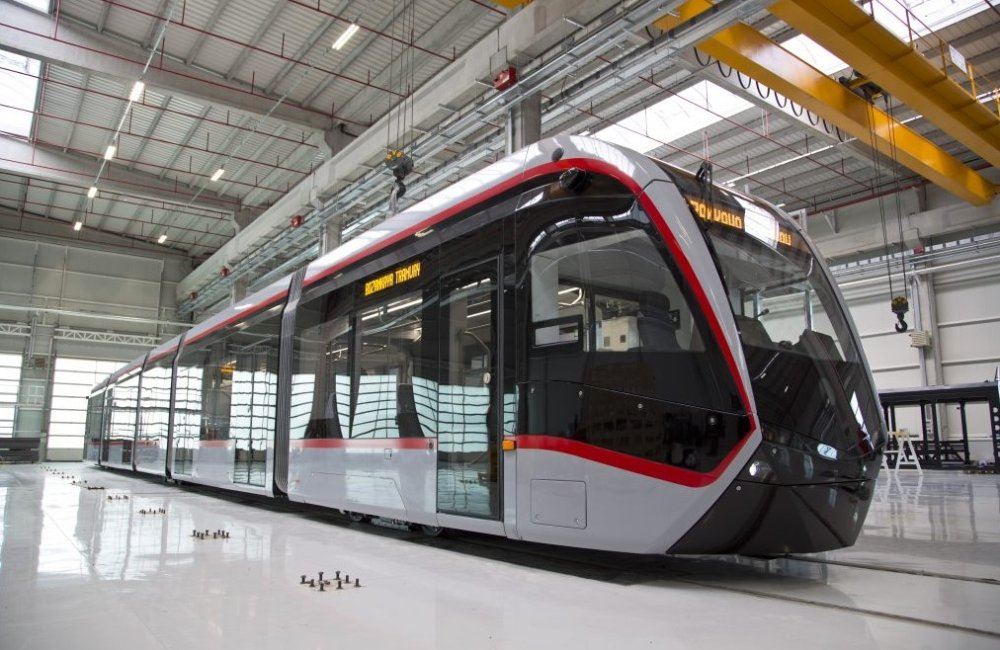
Bozankaya Turna 1 model designed for Kayseri

== Products ==
=== Electricity bus ===
- Sileo (electric bus; discontinued):
  - Sileo S10
  - Sileo S12
  - Sileo S18
  - Sileo S25

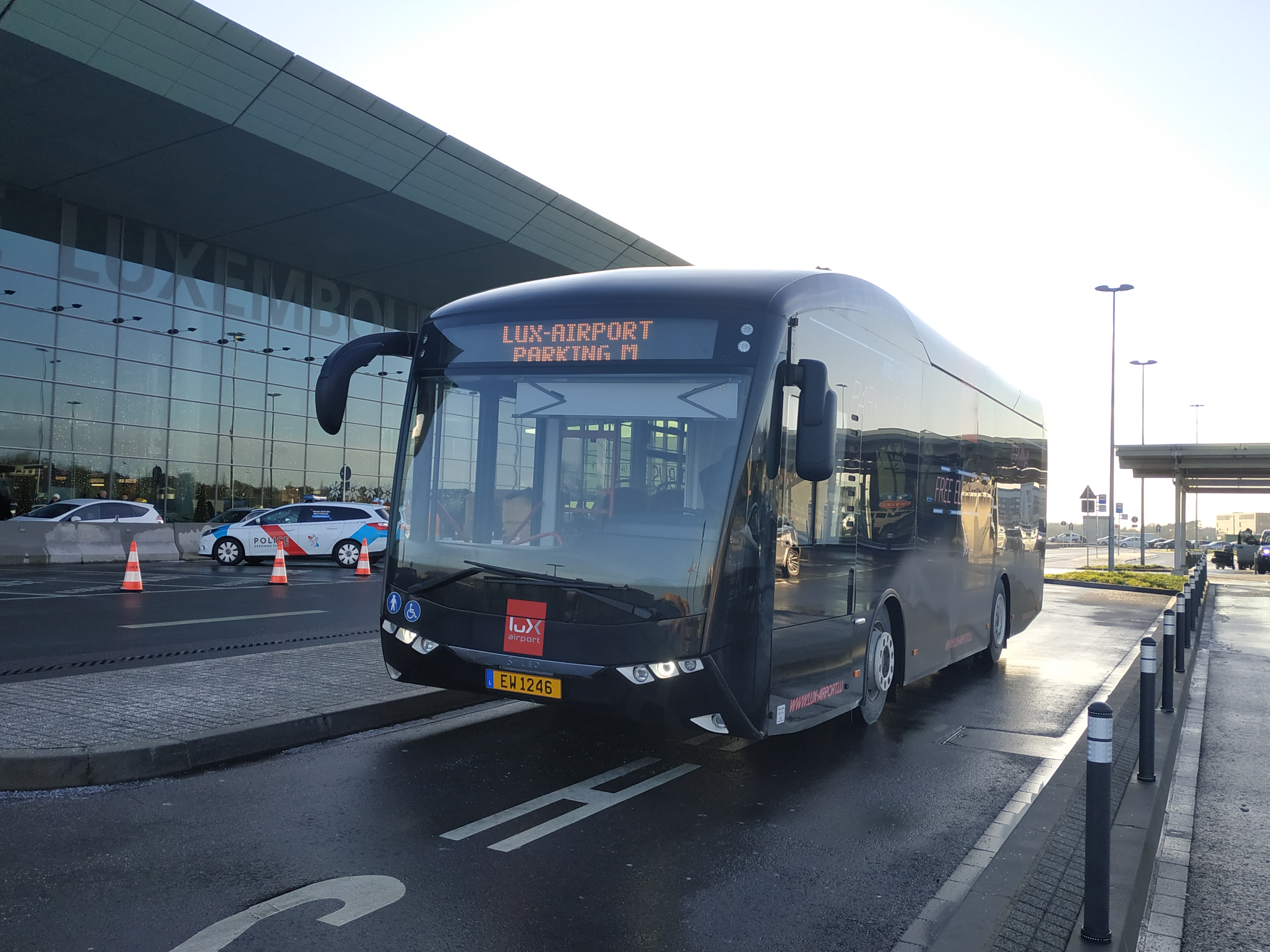
Bus navette parking Lux Airport, Sileo S10

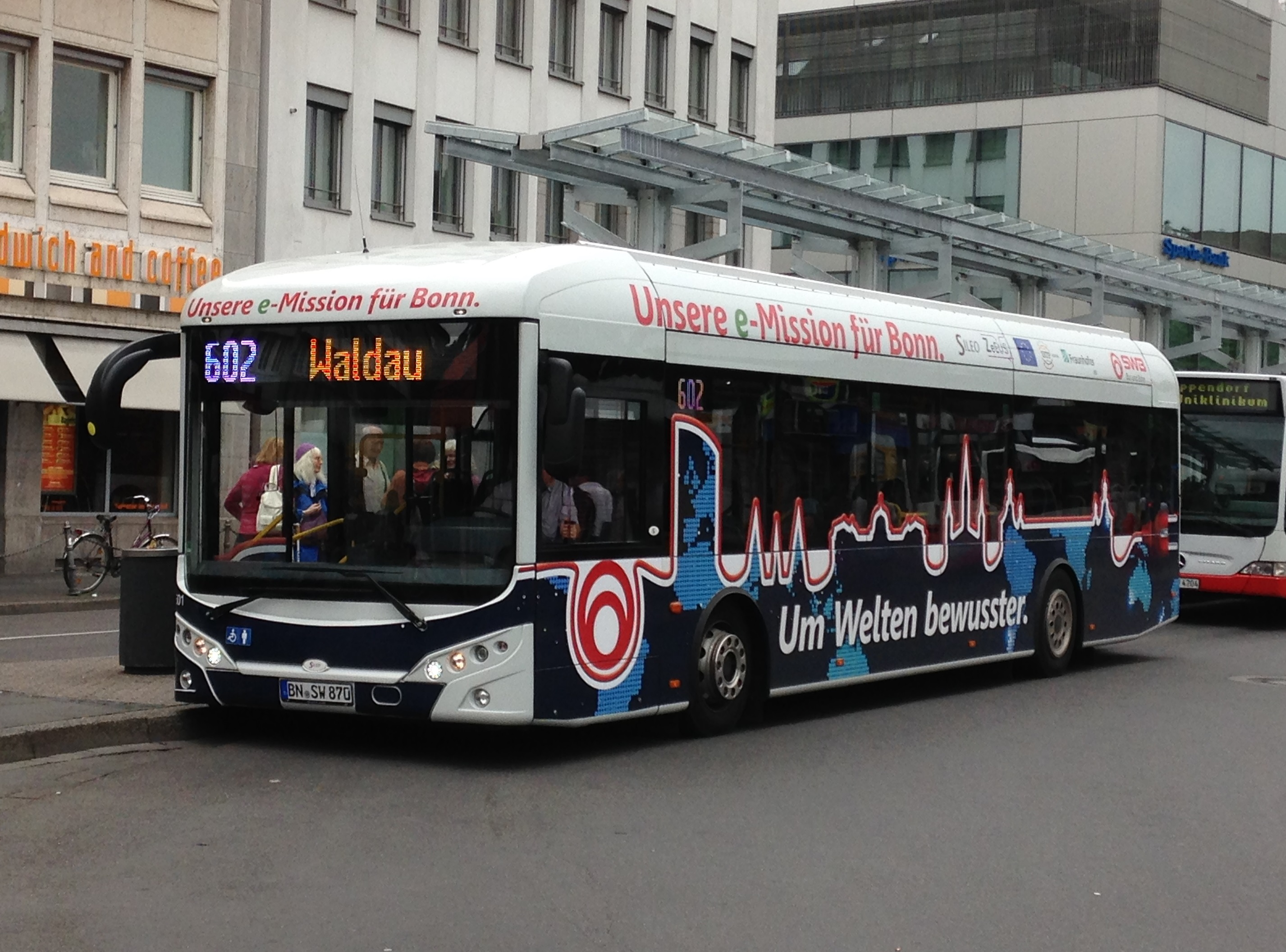
Sileo-S12

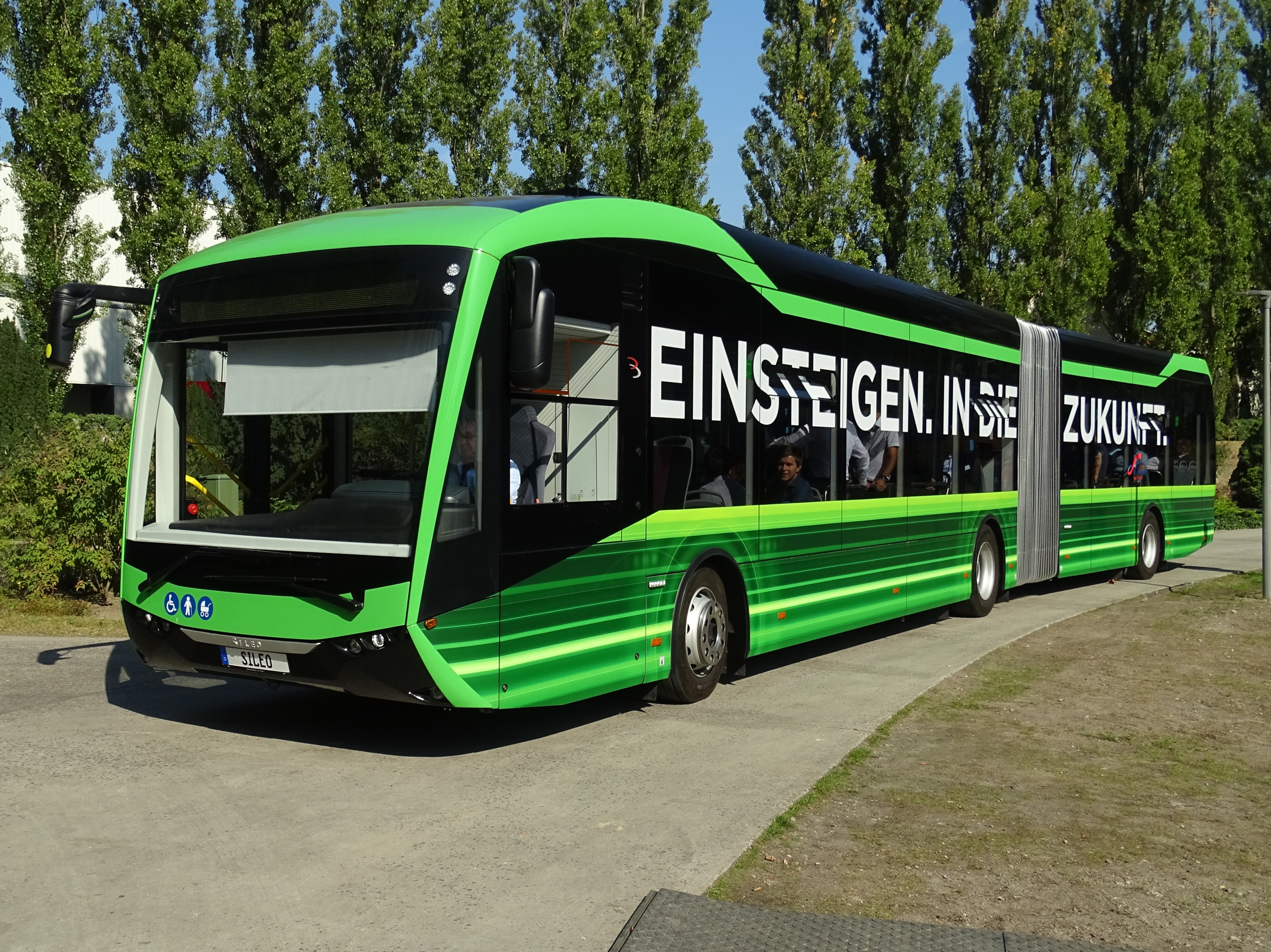
Sileo S18

=== Metro ===
Technical Specifications of the Vehicle

- 4 modules (flexible modular production) - 8 bogies (6 motorized + 2 trailer bogies) - 88 meters long, 3050 mm wide, 4000 mm high - 75% motorized vehicles - Stainless steel body - 1435 mm rail span - 1500 V DC, pantograph powered - Approx. 16 tons axle load - 1080 passenger capacity, 168 seated - Sliding plug type doors - 80 km/h maximum speed

=== Tram ===
==== Kayseri Tram ====
It weighs 42 tons, has a maximum speed of 70 km/h, and has 8 double doors and 4 single doors, %100 low-floor bidirectional (Turna 1). It is 32.7 meters long, with a total capacity of 370 passengers, including 64 seated and 100% low-floor bidirectional. Unlike other Turna 2 models, this is a custom-made vehicle featuring seat patterns inspired by the city's famous Mount Erciyes. It also includes yellow LED displays similar to those in Turna 1, as well as foldable seats that are not found in other Turna 2 models. (Turna 2)

==== Timișoara Tram ====
The 29.9-metre-long tram has a maximum speed of 70 km/h, an acceleration rate of 1.1 m/s², and can accommodate 251 passengers (including 48 seated). The trams are battery-powered and can travel up to 70 km on a single charge.

==== Iași Tram ====
Two variants, 29.9-metre-long with 278-passenger capacity (including 46 seated), and 20-metre-long with 200 passenger capacity (including 40 seated). The trams are equipped with air conditioning, heating, Wi-Fi, GPS, LED panels, and collision warning systems.

==== Kocaeli Tram ====
It is 33 meters long, has a capacity of 375 passengers, including 66 seated, and is 100% low-floor bidirectional (Turna 2).

==== Antalya Tram ====
The tram is 32.7 meters long, has a capacity of 375 passengers including 66 seated, and is 100% low-floor and bidirectional. Originally, more units were planned to be procured; however, only two were delivered following the termination of the contract. (Turna 2)

==== Naples Tram ====
It is 30 meters long, has a capacity of 274 passengers (including 64 seated), and is 100% low-floor bidirectional.

==== Belgrade Tram ====
It is 30 meters long with 282-passenger total capacity (including 46 seated), and is 100% low-floor unidirectional.

==== Samsun Tram ====
The tram is 42 meters long, has a total capacity of 492 passengers including 82 seated, and is 100% low-floor bidirectional.

==== Elbląg Tram ====
Ordered in 2025, the tram will be unidirectional, with a length between 19 and 24 meters.

=== Trambus ===
Bozankaya Trambus is a bi-articulated trolleybus.
