= Timișoara East railway station =

Timișoara Est
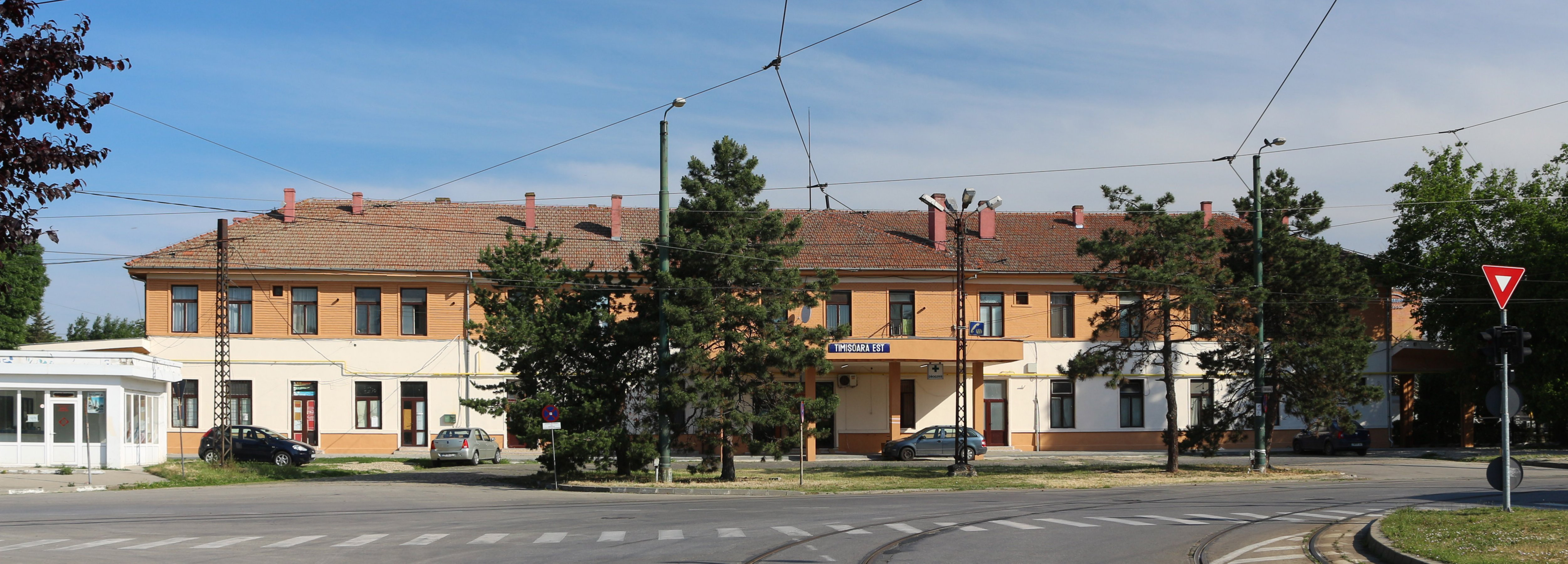

General information
- Other names: Little Station
- Location: 1 Avram Imbroane Street, Timișoara; Romania
- Coordinates: 45°46′00″N 21°14′40″E
- Owner: Căile Ferate Române
- Operator: Căile Ferate Române
- Lines: CFR Line 900 (Timișoara–Caransebeș); CFR Line 213 (Timișoara–Radna)

History
- Opened: 1886

Passengers
- 2012: 64,755
Location

Timișoara East railway station, previously known as Fabric railway station and colloquially as Little Station (Romanian: Gara Mică), is one of the five stations of Timișoara. Timișoara East is the second most important station in the city, after Timișoara North. The station is transited daily by 15 trains operated by CFR Călători. In 2012, 64,755 passengers boarded from Timișoara East, thereby a daily average of 144 passengers/day. It is also an important freight terminal, due to the presence of a base of a private rail operator.

== History ==
The station was built in 1886; the railway to Orșova was built in the same year and connected Timișoara with Bucharest and from there with Sofia and Istanbul. The station took over a large part of the traffic from Iosefin railway station (present-day Timișoara North railway station), especially the freight traffic. It provided businesses and factories in the area with materials and goods that were brought in by rail and with the distribution of products from those establishments. Also in Timișoara East there was a line that connected with the city's network of tram lines, having the same gauge.

Due to rail traffic growth, the station was expanded in 1899; during this process, both the building and the number of lines were enlarged. The building itself consisted of a main body, with ground floor and first floor and two secondary bodies. The most recent major change of the building took place in 1970, when it was completely storeyed.
