= Timișoara Industrial and Technological Park =

Business park in Timișoara, Romania

- Interactive map of Timișoara Industrial and Technological Park
- Location: Timișoara, Romania
- Coordinates: 45°47′57″N 21°10′32″E
- Opening date: 2004
- Construction cost: EUR 3.7 million
- Owner: Timiș County Council
- No. of tenants: 21
- Size: 18.37 ha
- Public transit: Bus: E6

Timișoara Industrial and Technological Park (Romanian: Parcul Industrial și Tehnologic Timișoara; abbreviated PITT) is a business park in the western Romanian city of Timișoara spread over 18.37 hectares on Calea Torontalului, a major traffic artery in the north of the city. Administered by the Timiș County Council, it was built in 2004 with PHARE funds of 3.7 million euros.

As of 2022, the park boasts a full occupancy rate, hosting 21 companies—16 Romanian and five with German, Irish, or Italian capital. These companies are involved in a wide range of activities, including medicine production, electrical panel manufacturing, custom software development, advertising material creation, as well as providing design, research and development, and logistics services.

== Location ==
The park is situated on Calea Torontalului, 6 km from the city center, along the national road DN6, which leads to the Cenad–Kiszombor border crossing with the European Union, located 75 km from the park. The Traian Vuia International Airport is just 15 km away, and the Timișoara North railway station is 8 km from the location.

== History ==
PITT was carried out by the Timiș County Council and the Timiș Economic and Social Development Agency, within a project financed by the PHARE SIF 2001 program, the National Fund for Regional Development, local funds, and other sources.

Inaugurated in October 2004, the park spans a total area of 18.37 ha, divided into 25 plots ranging from 950 m^{2} to 8,420 m^{2}. Additionally, PITT features an Administrative Pavilion that offers 19 rental spaces and can host events in its conference, protocol, and seminar rooms. The entire park is equipped with access roads, electricity, natural gas, drinking water, sewage, garbage collection, and telephone network.

Until the outbreak of the economic crisis in 2008, PITT had raised around 28 million euros from developers.

== Companies ==
- Alcortech Engineering – low voltage electrical installations
- Concita – civil and industrial constructions
- Electric Sys – industrial automation and electrical panels
- Ornella Design – design and printing
- Preferita – food production and wholesale
- Prospero – breads, cakes, and pastries
- RPW Logistics – rental of storage spaces
- STADA Hemofarm – drug control laboratory
- Stantobanat – perforated metal sheet
- TipoMedia – printing
- Willy Kreutz – precision turning parts
