= Dâmbovița, Timișoara =

District of Timișoara, Romania

Coordinates: 45.7357945°N 21.1990196°E

Dâmbovița is a district in southern Timișoara. Its name comes from the homonymous boulevard that crosses it from west to east. It is a district created for the labor migration produced when the communist regime decided to accelerate industrialization. In this district is the headquarters and the main depot of STPT, the local public transport company.
