= British International School of Timișoara =

Location
- 8 Aurora Street, Timișoara, Romania
- Coordinates: 45.786308°N 21.225269°E

Information
- Type: Private
- Established: 2019
- Authority: Ministry of Education and Research
- Head of school: Ciprian Țiplea
- Years offered: R to 13
- Age range: 4 to 18
- Enrollment: 589
- Classes: 31
- Language: English
- Campus type: Suburban
- Accreditations: List: Council of British International Schools; International Baccalaureate; Cambridge International Education; Pearson Edexcel; Independent Schools Inspectorate; Romanian Agency for Quality Assurance in Pre-university Education
- Website: britishschool-timisoara.ro

The British International School of Timișoara (BIST) is a co-educational private international school providing a British-style education for children aged 4 to 18. Teaching is primarily in English, with Romanian offered as a first language course. Children from 30 nationalities, predominantly Romanian-born, learn here, guided by educators originating from 15 countries. It has been an International Baccalaureate school since 2022.

== History ==
The present BIST campus originally housed the Marienheim Monastery of the School Sisters of Notre Dame, constructed in 1910. During World War II, part of the prison camp infirmary operated there; it was established in the fall of 1940 and extended across 17 hectares. It is estimated that between 6,000 and 7,000 Hungarian soldiers and around 1,000 German soldiers lost their lives here. The property was nationalized in 1948, when 14 sisters still lived on-site, and from 1959 to 1990 it served as a school of housekeeping.

It was taken over by the Foundation for the Support and Education of Youth (listed in the NGO Register in 2016) and converted into a school following the British curriculum.

== Campus ==
The campus is located in the northern part of Timișoara and comprises a primary school housed in the former housekeeping school building, which was expanded in 2018, as well as a high school inaugurated in 2023 and named Ana Șandor in honor of the mother of two founders – a former Romanian language and literature teacher at the High School of Philology and History (now the Banat National College). The high school building features three science laboratories, an art room, a music and theater room, a two-story library, 22 classrooms, several multi-purpose spaces, and a teachers' lounge. The campus also includes a sports hall (opened in 2022), a park for student breaks, playgrounds, and various sports fields.

The campus can accommodate 924 students.

== Accreditations ==
The British International School of Timișoara earned COBIS international accreditation in its very first year of operation. In the same year, 2019, it also obtained Cambridge certification, enabling the establishment of the first Cambridge International examination centre in the western region of the country.

== Academic performance ==
In 2025, the school's students attained a 100% pass rate in the International Baccalaureate, ranking the school among the top 5% of the 5,900 institutions offering the program.
