= Moșnița Nouă =

- Commune
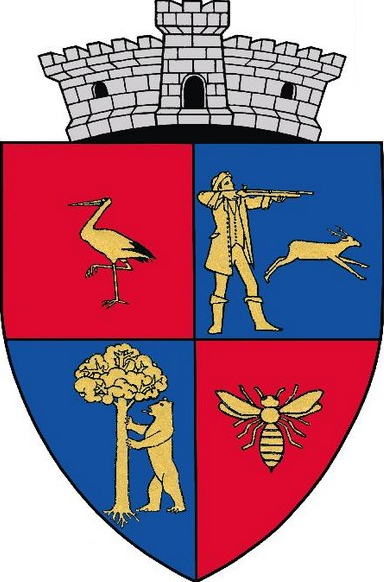
- Coat of arms

- Location in Timiș County

- Location in Romania
- Coordinates: 45°43′N 21°20′E
- Country: Romania
- County: Timiș
- Established: 1902

Government
  - Mayor (2024–): Gerald-Oscar Simonis (Ind.)
- Area: 69 km^{2} (27 sq mi)
- Population (2021-12-01): 16,424
  - Density: 240/km^{2} (620/sq mi)
- Time zone: EET/EEST (UTC+2/+3)
- Postal code: 307285–307289
- Vehicle reg.: TM
- Website: mosnita.ro

Moșnița Nouă (Hungarian: Mosnicatelep or Újmosnica; German: Neumoschnitz; Serbian: Нова Мошница, romanized: Nova Mošnica) is a commune in Timiș County, Romania. It is composed of five villages: Albina, Moșnița Nouă (commune seat), Moșnița Veche, Rudicica and Urseni.

== Geography ==
Moșnița Nouă is located in the central part of Timiș County, about 8 km (5 mi) from Timișoara city center. Due to the urban evolution on the territory that separates it from Timișoara, Moșnița Nouă has become practically attached to it. The territory of the commune occupies a total area of 6,900 ha (17,000 acres), which can be broken down as:

- 285 ha (700 acres) – Bistra Forest;
- 1,821 ha (4,500 acres) – built-up area;
- 4,794 ha (11,850 acres) – unincorporated area.

== History ==
As its name suggests, Moșnița Nouă ("New Moșnița") is relatively newly established, having a little over 100 years of existence. It was founded in 1902 by Hungarian settlers from the Békés County and the Hungarian town of Szentes. They were brought here by the Austro-Hungarian administration that ordered the old inhabitants to be dispossessed of the necessary lands, the area of the current site to be deforested and also ordered the construction of the new settlement exclusively of ethnic Hungarians. Over time, Moșnița Nouă surpassed the old settlement Moșnița Veche (first mentioned in 1332) in terms of importance and became the seat of the commune with the same name.

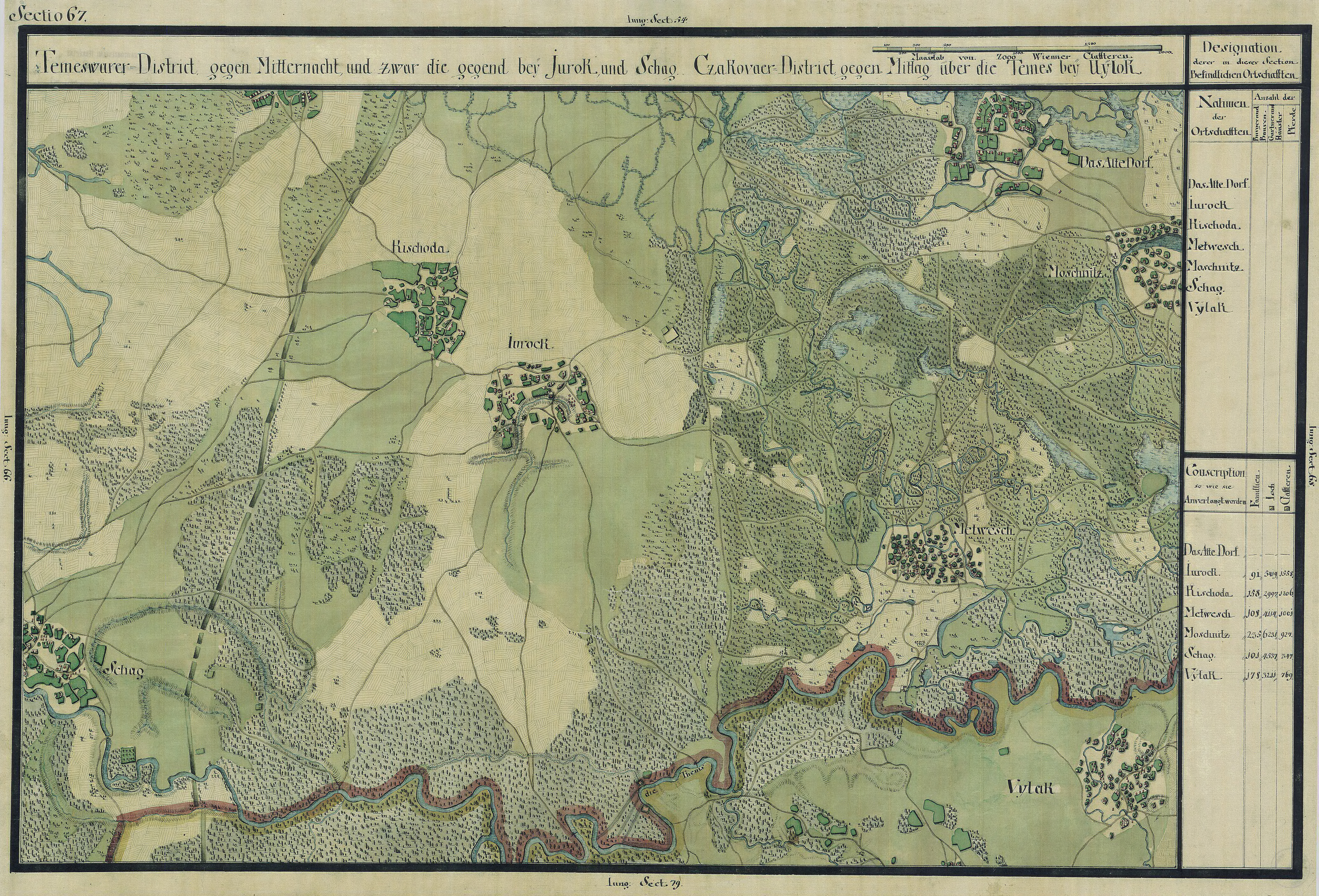
Urseni (Metwesch) and Moșnița Veche (Moschnitz) in the Josephinian Land Survey of 1769–1772

Moșnița Veche dates from 1332; in 1890 it was part of Temes County, Timișoara District, it was a seat of commune and had 2,208 inhabitants. The oral tradition attributes to a Romanian Niță the foundation of the village of Moșnița, not on today's location but in Satu Bătrân, one kilometer away, near the Subuleasa brook. Due to the frequent floods, Niță moved the village on today's location. The landlords kept the right of ownership over the old village and its border until 1820, when this right was taken away from them, receiving in return the right over the forest near the village (to the south). In 1904, their right to the forest was taken away, which was cleared, and in its place the Austro-Hungarian administration set up a colony with ethnic Hungarians, the future Moșnița Nouă.

Urseni is about as old as Moșnița Veche. It was known until the 20th century by its Hungarian name Medves, despite the fact that the village was mostly Romanian. In 1890 it was part of Temes County, Timișoara District and was a seat of commune.

Albina was established in 1925 by colonizing with 70 Romanian families originating from Sebeșu de Jos, Sibiu County, as well as seven families from Sadu, Sibiu County. Each settler owned 8 ha of arable land and 2,877 m^{2} of land for house and garden. In order to raise their households, the settlers were financially supported by Albina Bank from Sibiu. For this reason, it took the name of the credit institute that made possible the establishment of the village.

Rudicica is the most recent village of the commune, a small hamlet of Moșnița that was formed in the 1950s.

== Demographics ==
Ethnic composition (2021)
1. Romanians (74.9%)
2. Hungarians (3.59%)
3. Unknown (19.6%)
4. Others (1.96%)
Religious composition (2021)
1. Orthodox (61.8%)
2. Pentecostals (4.91%)
3. Roman Catholics (4.67%)
4. Reformed (1.84%)
5. Baptists (1.34%)
6. Unknown (21.8%)
7. Others (1.58%)
8. Irreligious, atheists and agnostics (2.13%)

Moșnița Nouă had a population of 16,424 inhabitants at the 2021 census, up 164.8% from the 2011 census. Most inhabitants are Romanians (74.89%), with a minority of Hungarians (3.59%). For 19.56% of the population, ethnicity is unknown. By religion, most inhabitants are Orthodox (61.75%), but there are also minorities of Pentecostals (4.91%), Roman Catholics (4.67%), Reformed (1.84%) and Baptists (1.34%). For 21.78% of the population, religious affiliation is unknown.

Census		Ethnic composition
Year	Population	Romanians	Hungarians	Germans	Roma
1880	1,901	1,369	324	192	–
1890	2,166	1,573	298	278	–
1900	2,421	1,510	612	281	–
1910	3,158	1,492	1,454	188	–
1920	3,492	1,469	1,809	185	–
1930	4,333	1,987	2,007	251	42
1941	4,886	2,253	2,252	322	–
1956	3,301	1,971	1,229	94	1
1966	3,789	2,480	1,233	65	–
1977	4,784	3,535	1,156	43	18
1992	3,941	3,201	661	20	33
2002	4,298	3,530	598	20	114
2011	6,203	5,097	545	17	56
2021	16,424	12,300	590	51	137

== Politics and administration ==
The commune of Moșnița Nouă is administered by a mayor and a local council composed of 17 councilors. The mayor, Gerald-Oscar Simonis, independent politician, has been in office since 2024. As from the 2024 local elections, the local council has the following composition by political parties:

Party	Seats	Composition
National Liberal Party	4	
Save Romania Union–People's Movement Party–Force of the Right	4	
Social Democratic Party	3	
Timiș Liberal Party	2	
Ind.	2	
Alliance for the Union of Romanians	1	
Democratic Alliance of Hungarians in Romania	1	
