= Timișoara North railway station =

Railway station in Romania

Timișoara Nord
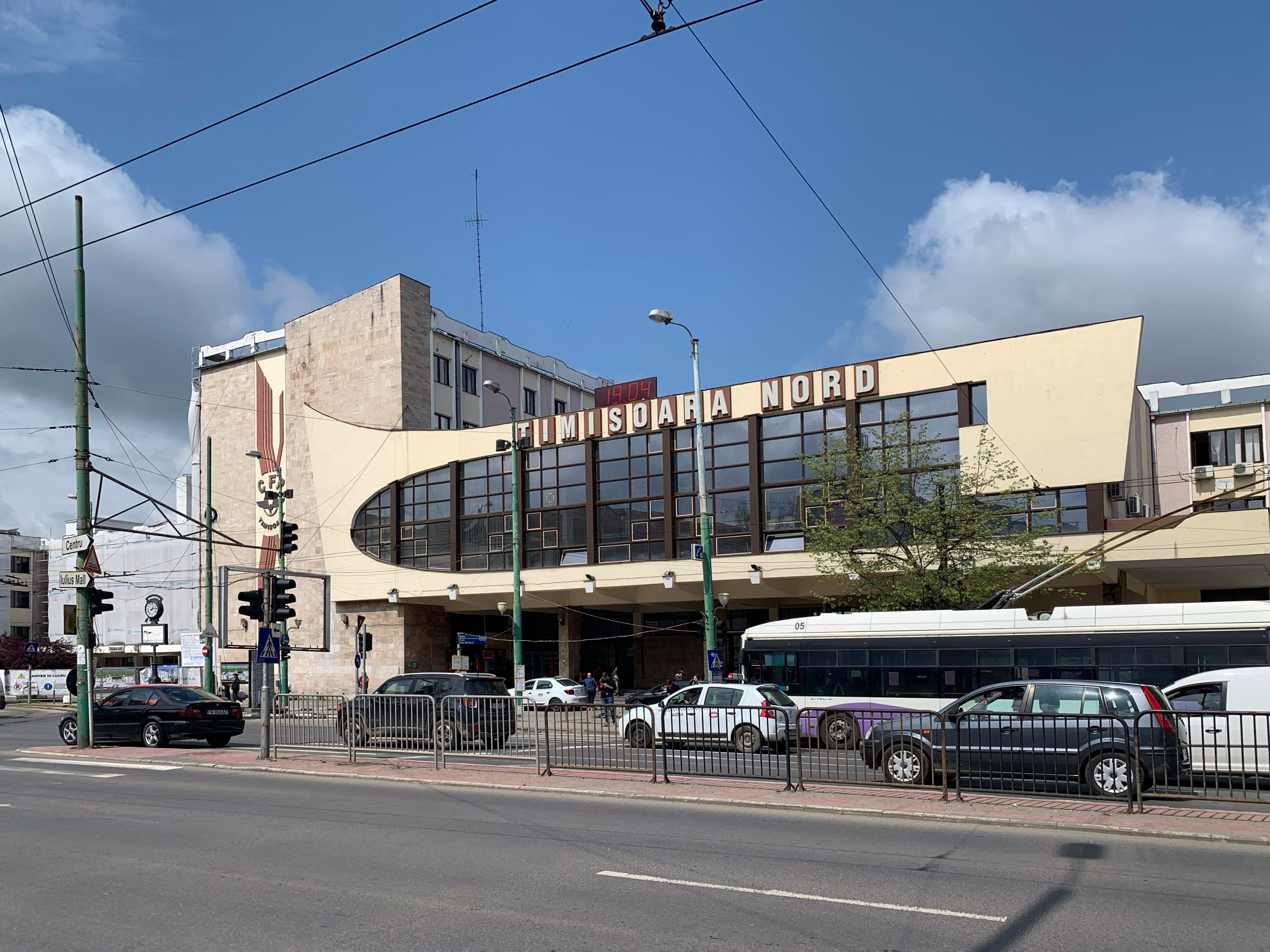

General information
- Location: 2 Gării Street, Timișoara; Romania
- Coordinates: 45°45′4″N 21°12′27″E
- Owner: Căile Ferate Române
- Line: 9 (see below)
- Platforms: 13
- Tracks: 14
- Train operators: CFR Călători; Regio Călători; Astra Trans Carpatic

Construction
- Parking: Yes
- Cycle facilities: Yes
- Accessible: Yes
- Architect: Ferenc Pfaff
- Architectural style: Neoclassical (original); Modernist

History
- Opened: 1897
- Rebuilt: 1976
- Electrified: 1974
- Former names: Iosefin (1897–1919); Domnița Elena (1919–1944)
Location

Timișoara North railway station (Romanian: Gara Timișoara Nord) is the main railway station in Timișoara and also the largest railway station in western Romania. With an average daily ridership of about 5,530 passengers, Timișoara North is one of the busiest railway stations in Romania.

== History ==
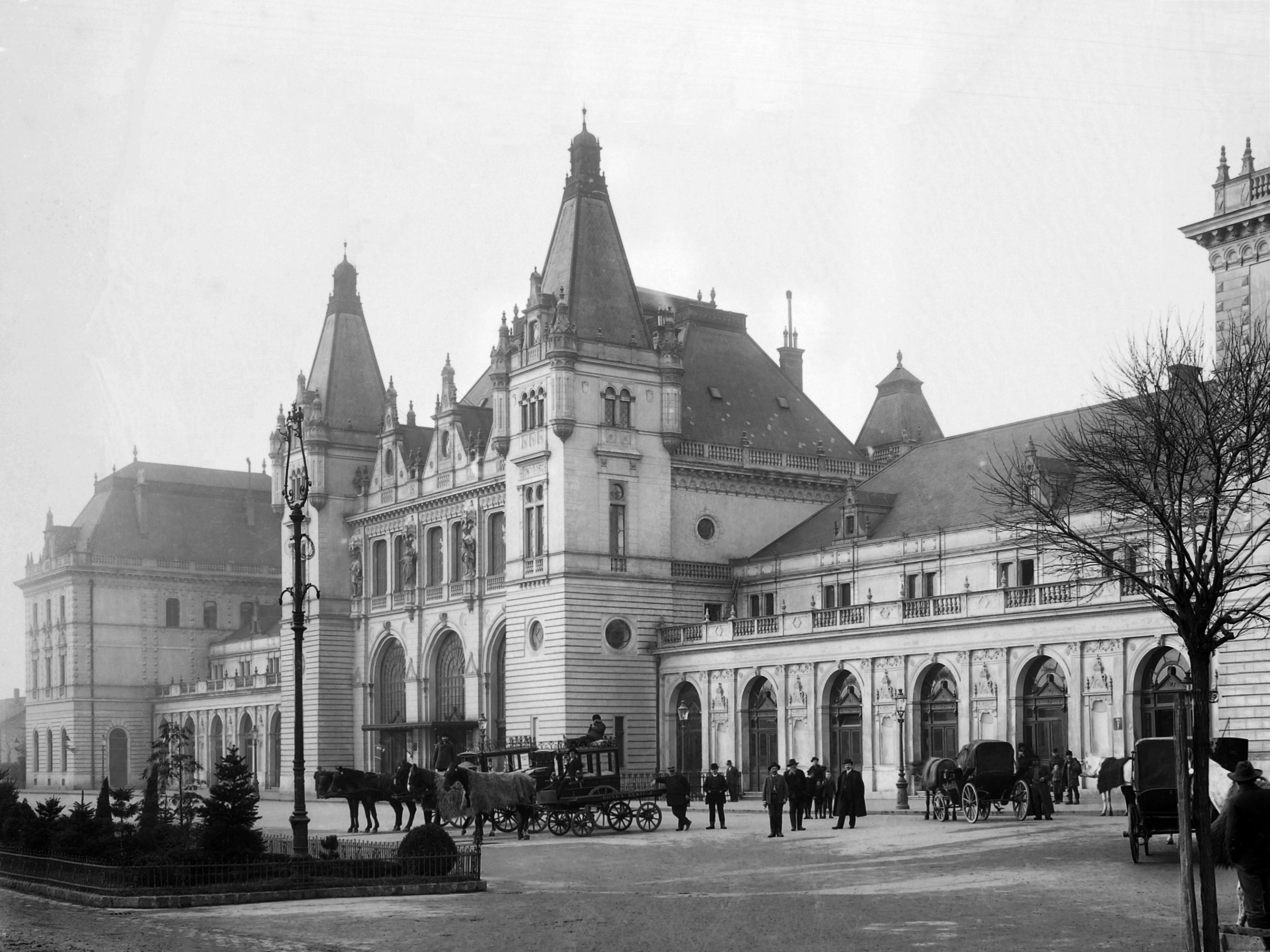
Iosefin railway station in 1904

The first passenger station was built in 1857 on the site of the former freight warehouse. Although small in size, the station provided rail connections to cities such as Arad, Orșova, Bucharest, Reșița, as well as other nearby localities. As the number of passengers increased, the old station no longer met the needs. In this regard, a new monumental station was inaugurated in 1897. The designer of the station was Hungarian architect Ferenc Pfaff (1851–1913), whose name is linked, among others, to the stations of Szeged, Pécs, Miskolc, Debrecen, Rijeka, Zagreb, Bratislava, Košice, Vršac, Cluj-Napoca, Jimbolia or Arad. Construction costs amounted to almost four million Kronen. Its original name was Josefstädter Bahnhof (in German) or Józsefvárosi indóház (in Hungarian), translated as Iosefin railway station, after the name of the district where it is located. Built in neoclassical style, under the influence of the French Renaissance, the complex was dominated by the main body with three monumental arched gates guarded laterally by two bastions with towers and the facade was decorated with a group of four statues framed by first-floor windows. In the middle of the station square was a small park surrounded by an iron fence and planted with conifers. By the early 20th century, 49 passenger trains and 30 freight trains transited the new station daily. The famous Orient Express stopped in this station starting with 1905.

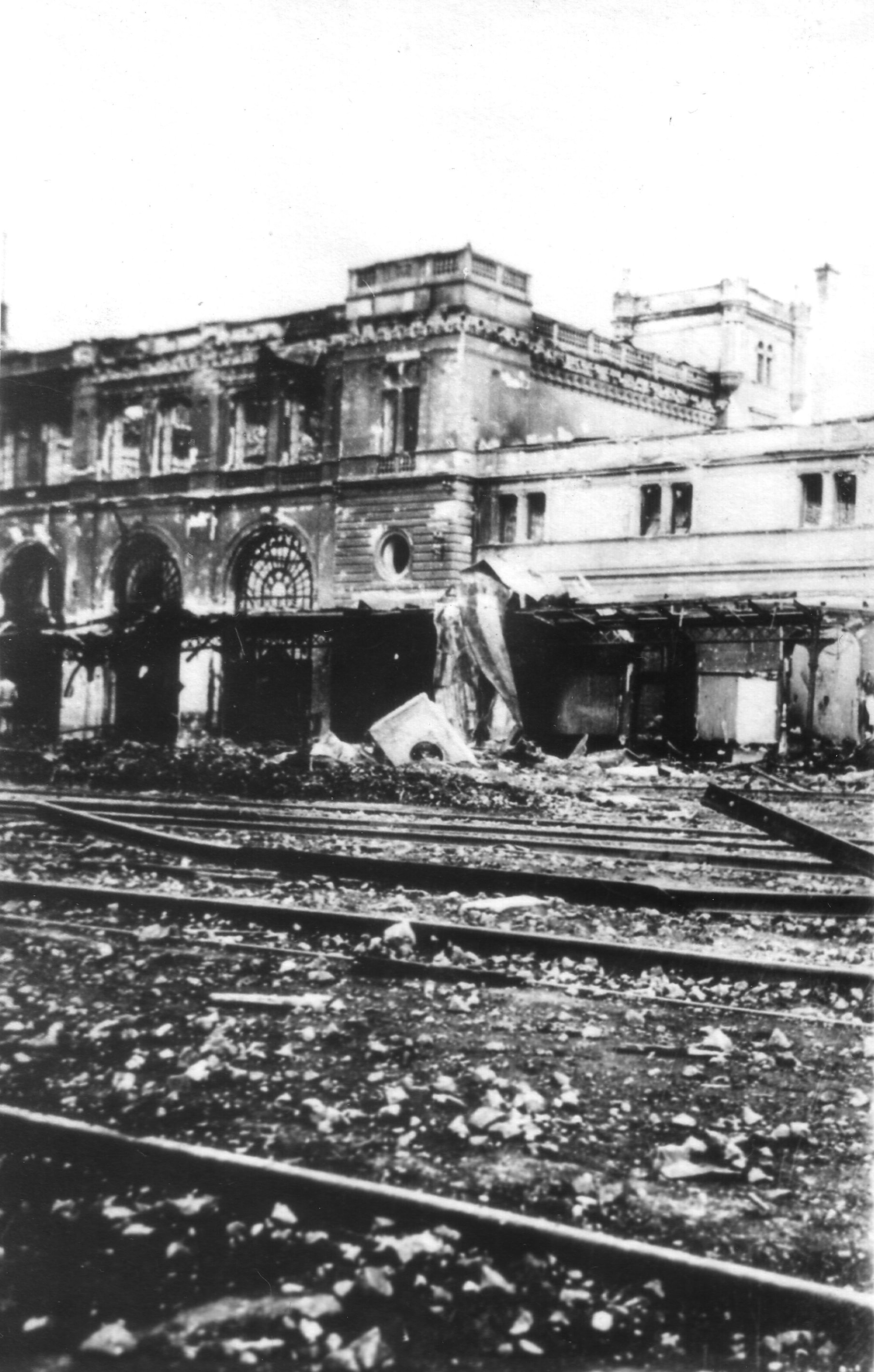
Domnița Elena railway station after the Allied bombing raids of 16/17 June 1944

In 1919, after the union of Banat with the Kingdom of Romania and the establishment of the Romanian administration in Timișoara, the station was renamed Domnița Elena railway station, after the wife of Prince Alexandru Ioan Cuza, a name it bore until World War II. However, most people in Timișoara called it the "Big Station" (Romanian: Gara Mare). On 3 July 1944, the station was heavily damaged by the bombings of Allied aviation, and on the night of 30/31 October 1944, it was bombed again, this time by Luftwaffe, being almost completely destroyed. The reconstruction was partially done according to the initial plans. Until the 1960s, the east wing of the old building was still in place, but in 1976 it was modernized, and the architectural style changed radically.

In 2020, CFR signed a contract worth almost 4.5 million euros for the rehabilitation and refurbishment of the station. The works mainly aim at restoring the facade, repairing the pedestrian tunnel and arranging the station forecourt.

== Lines ==
From Timișoara North start nine railway lines, which connect Timișoara to cities located both in Romania and Hungary, and from there to other cities in Europe:

- CFR Line 213 (Timișoara–Radna)
- CFR Line 217 (Timișoara–Nerău);
- CFR Line 218 (Timișoara–Cenad)
- CFR Line 310 (Timișoara–Arad). From Arad there are trains to Cluj-Napoca, Oradea, Iași or Satu Mare. There is also a line that goes to Budapest.
- CFR Line 900 (Timișoara–Bucharest), part of Pan-European Corridor IV (southern branch)
- CFR Line 918 Timișoara–Buziaș–Lugoj
- CFR Line 919 (Timișoara–Jimbolia) with extension to Kikinda
- CFR Line 922 (Timișoara–Stamora Moravița). The line continues in Serbia, through Vršac to Belgrade.
- CFR Line 926 (Timișoara–Cruceni)

== Statistics ==
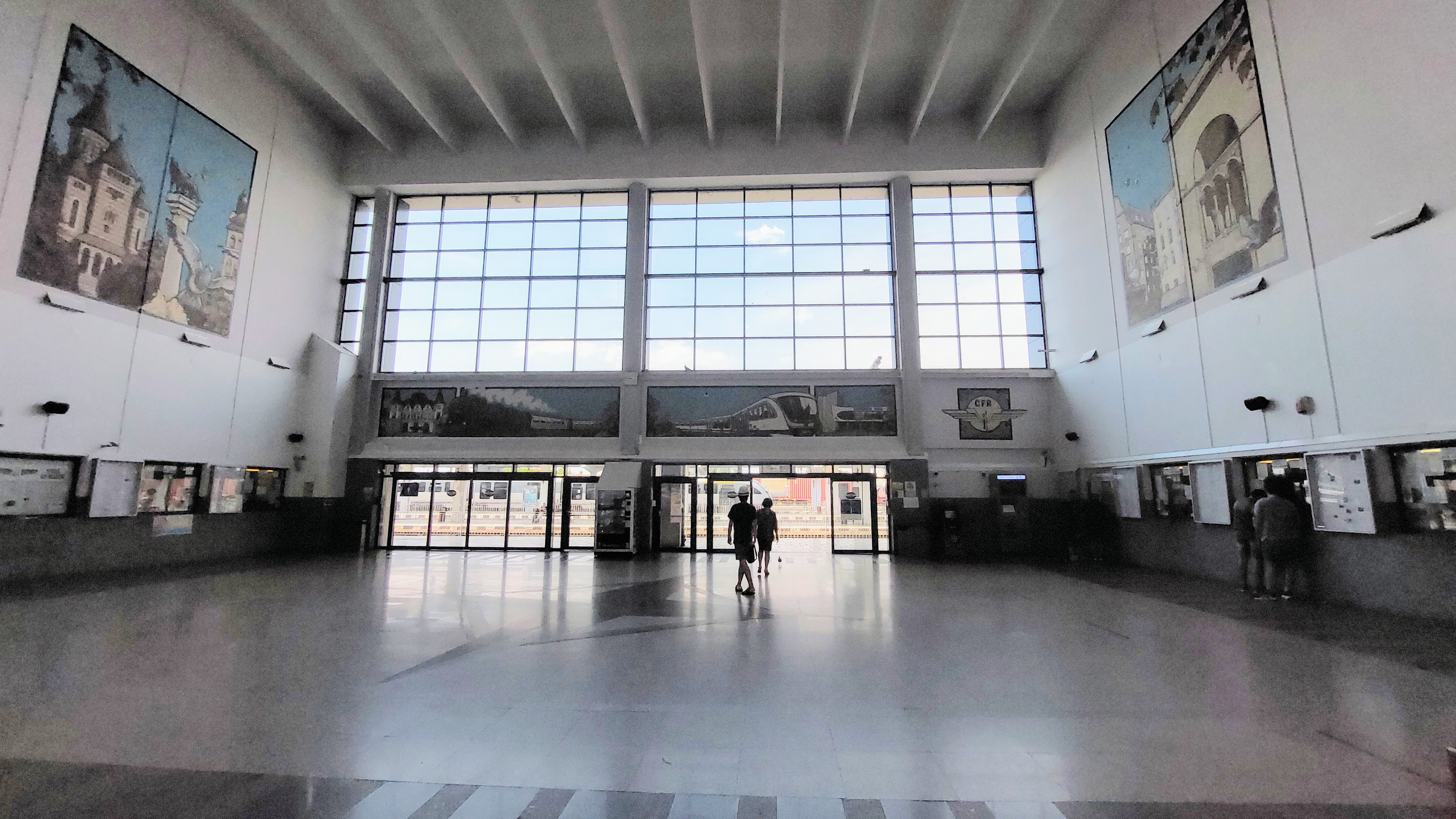
Interior of the station

As of 2017, Timișoara North serves about 174 trains, including domestic trains to the majority of Romanian cities operated by Căile Ferate Române, as well as international trains to Budapest. Trains to Belgrade have been discontinued as of 1 August 2017. The train route now only runs as far as the Romanian border village of Stamora Germană in the commune of Moravița, 5 km from the Serbian border.

== Public transport ==
Timișoara North can be accessed by trolleybus, tram and bus:

- 🚎 11, 14, 18
- 🚊 1, 8, 9
- 🚌 3, E1, E3
