= Citadel Boulevard =

- Native name: Bulevardul Cetății (Romanian)
- Former name(s): Vár sor
- Maintained by: Timișoara City Hall
- Length: 1,627.87 m (5,340.8 ft)
- Location: Timișoara, Romania
- Coordinates: 45°45′55″N 21°12′47″E
- From: Balta Verde
- To: Calea Torontalului

Citadel Boulevard (Romanian: Bulevardul Cetății) is a major traffic artery in the northwest part of the western Romanian city of Timișoara. It serves as the connecting artery between Circumvalațiunii and Mehala, respectively between Dacia and Bucovina.

== History ==
After the fortress walls were demolished in the 1890s, the former military corridors were transformed into urban boulevards. This led to the emergence of Vár sor, a main thoroughfare that traced the edge of the old fortress. Following the incorporation of the Banat region into Romania after 1918, Hungarian street names were gradually replaced with Romanian ones. Vár sor was likely renamed or reconfigured during the interwar period, although the exact naming history may differ by section. In time, parts of Vár sor were absorbed into what is now known as Bulevardul Cetății—"Citadel Boulevard"—a modern name that preserves the historical connection to the former fortress.

The boulevard was redeveloped as part of a €22 million European project that included several major upgrades: the restoration and modernization of a 1.5 km stretch of tram line, the rehabilitation of more than 25,000 square meters of roadway, the refurbishment of sidewalks along the entire route, and the creation of over 20,000 square meters of green spaces and bicycle paths. The project took three years to complete and was officially inaugurated in February 2024.

== Transport ==
Trams 4 and 7 run on Citadel Boulevard, both departing from the station located at the intersection with Calea Torontalului (Ciocanul). The boulevard is also served by bus lines E2, E6, E1, M44 and M50, as well as trolleybus lines 13 and M43.
