= Calea Bogdăneștilor =

Boulevard in the western Romanian city of Timișoara

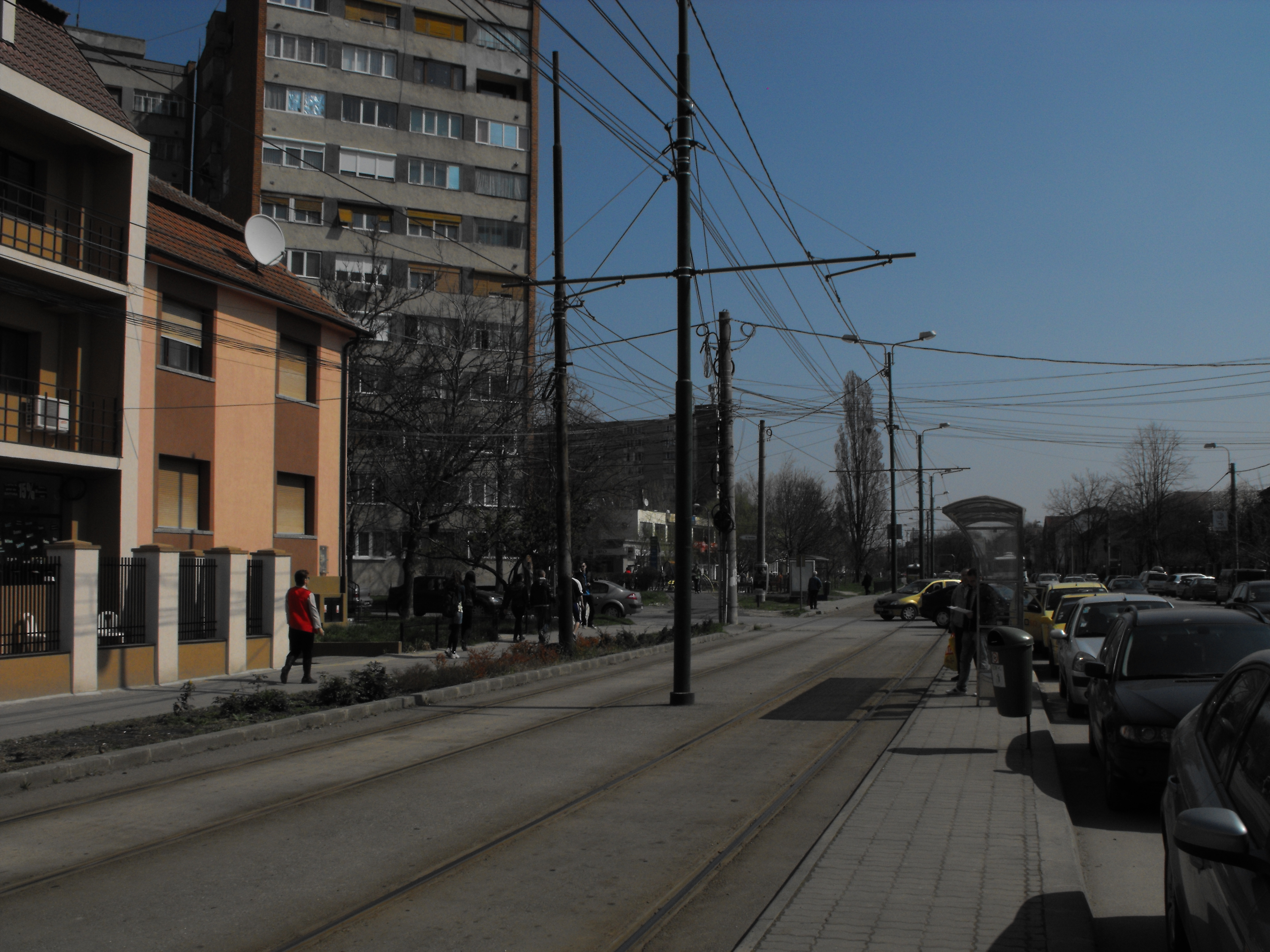
- Calea Bogdăneștilor in March 2011
- Former name: Rezső sor
- Maintained by: Timișoara City Hall
- Length: 2,863.28 m (9,394.0 ft)
- Location: Blașcovici, Timișoara, Romania
- Coordinates: 45°45′30″N 21°12′16″E
- From: Calea Circumvalațiunii
- To: Solventul Passage

Calea Bogdăneștilor is a boulevard in the western Romanian city of Timișoara. It is purportedly named after a wealthy family of Catholic priests from Banat, in whose garden the Blașcovici district would later have been formed.

== History ==
During the Austro-Hungarian period, the boulevard was known as Rezső sor, most likely named after Crown Prince Rudolf (Rezső in Hungarian) of the Austro-Hungarian Empire. It was part of an expanding network of radial boulevards extending outward from Timișoara's historic fortress center, designed to connect the city core with the developing outskirts. At the time, the surrounding area was predominantly semi-rural, with agricultural land, gardens, and small-scale industry gradually taking root in the late 19th and early 20th centuries. The boulevard itself had limited infrastructure—mainly unpaved surfaces, horse-drawn tram lines, and sparse street lighting—while nearby, clusters of workers' housing and brickworks began to emerge.

After the Treaty of Trianon in 1920 and the integration of the Banat region into Romania, Rezső sor was renamed Calea Bogdăneștilor. During the interwar years, the boulevard experienced accelerated urbanization, driven by Timișoara's expanding industrial base. In the communist era, Calea Bogdăneștilor evolved into a key residential and industrial corridor. It became home to factories, warehouses, and modest apartment buildings. A tram line—Line 5—was introduced, reinforcing the boulevard's role as a major public transit route. Although infrastructure saw gradual improvements during this period, by the 1980s it had fallen into visible decline due to insufficient maintenance.

Following the 1989 Revolution, the boulevard entered a period of infrastructure decline, marked by deteriorating tram rails, worn asphalt, crumbling sidewalks, and exposed overhead utility lines. As Timișoara expanded westward, urban sprawl led to heavier traffic and growing congestion along Calea Bogdăneștilor. Though it remained in use, the boulevard became increasingly outdated, with little greenery, inadequate lighting, and a fragmented, outdated urban layout.

The boulevard was completely modernized between March 2021 and June 2024 through a project partially financed by European funds of 30 million euros. The project included, among other things, the rehabilitation of the tram line, the widening of the road to two lanes in each direction, as well as the arrangement of sidewalks, bike paths and green areas.
