= Ronaț Roman Catholic Church =

Church in Ronaț, Timișoara, Romania

Holy Trinity Church
- Biserica Sfânta Treime
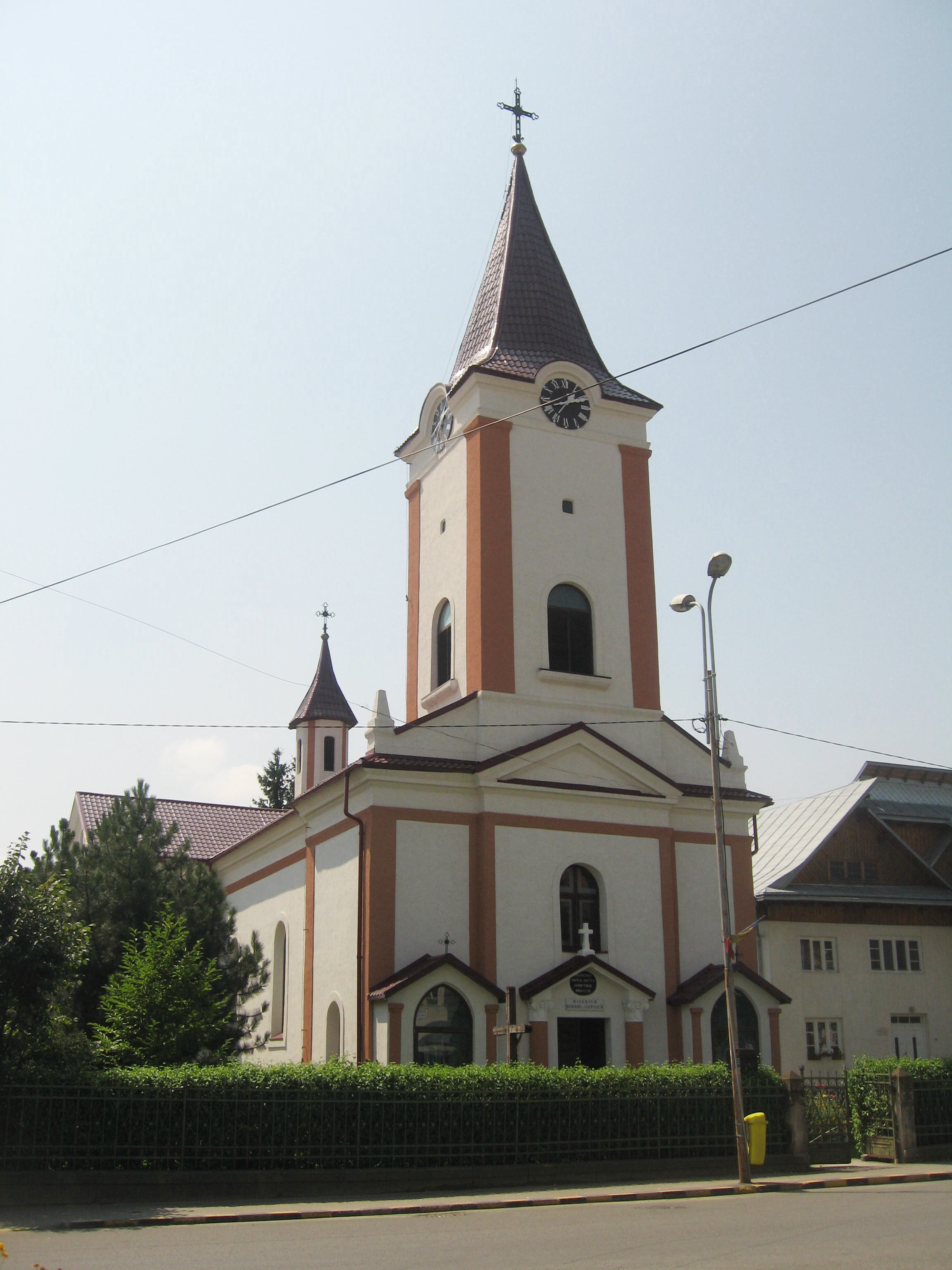

Religion
- Affiliation: Roman Catholic
- Patron: Holy Trinity
- Year consecrated: 1964
- Status: Active

Location
- Location: 13 Cireșului Street, Timișoara
- Interactive map of Holy Trinity Church
- Coordinates: 45.7536216°N 21.1847504°E

Architecture
- Completed: 1928

The Holy Trinity Church (Romanian: Biserica Sfânta Treime) is a Roman Catholic church in the Ronaț district of Timișoara.

== History ==
It was built in 1928 for the Roman Catholic employees of the Romanian Railways from Ronaț, then a colony of Mehala. In fact, Ronaț was built near the railway, close to the station and the company's workplaces. In this church, every Sunday and holiday, a single Holy Liturgy is celebrated in the Hungarian, Romanian and German languages.

During the Allied bombings in the morning of 3 July 1944, the church was hit by six bombs that destroyed it completely; only the altar remained standing. For this reason, liturgies were held for a while in a private house in the area, owned by teacher Hermine Muschung, then by the Marosan family. The reconstruction works began in 1946, under the parish priest Georg Wetzl from Iosefin. In 1948, Bishop Augustin Pacha obtained help from the Apostolic Nunciature, worth 50,000 lei, for the restoration of the church in Ronaț. However, the works were stopped after the installation of the atheist communist regime. It would only be finished in 1964. The consecration service was officiated by Monsignor Konrad Kernweiss, Ordinarius Substitutus of the Diocese of Timișoara. In the 1980s, the church was painted by Paul Veres, an artist who grew up in Ronaț.

The church is dedicated to the Holy Trinity, with its altarpiece and two side statues of Mary and Jesus originating from the old church. Among its four bells, one dates back to 1925, while the other three were made in 1932.
