= Bombing of Romania in World War II =

The bombing of Romania in World War II comprised two series of events: until August 1944, Allied operations, and, following the overthrow of Ion Antonescu's dictatorship, operations by Nazi Germany.

The primary target of Allied operations was Ploiești, the major site of Romania's oil industry. The largest refinery there—Astra Română—processed 2,000,000 short tons (1,800,000 t) of petroleum a year, providing much of the fuel for the German military. Other attacks were against Bucharest, the country's capital.

== Soviet air raids ==
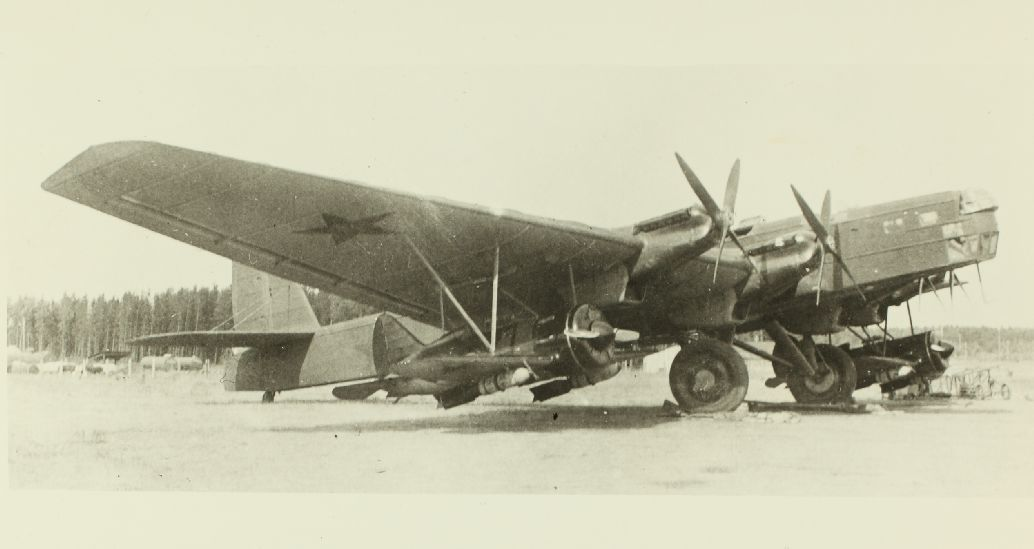
A TB-3 Zveno bomber

=== 1941 ===
The first airstrikes against Romania occurred after Romania joined the Third Reich in June 1941 during their invasion of the Soviet Union. In the following two months, Soviet Air Forces conducted several attacks against the port of Constanța and its oil terminals with limited effects. On 26 June, Tupolev SB, Ilyushin DB-3, and Il-4 bombers participated in a coordinated raid with Soviet warships on Constanța. The King Carol I Bridge was also attacked by Zveno-SPB bombers two times in August. In the second raid, one of its spans was destroyed and an oil pipeline was damaged. After the successful Axis powers' Crimean campaign and overall deterioration of the Soviet position, Soviet attacks against Romania ceased.

== Western Allied raids ==
=== 1942–1943 ===
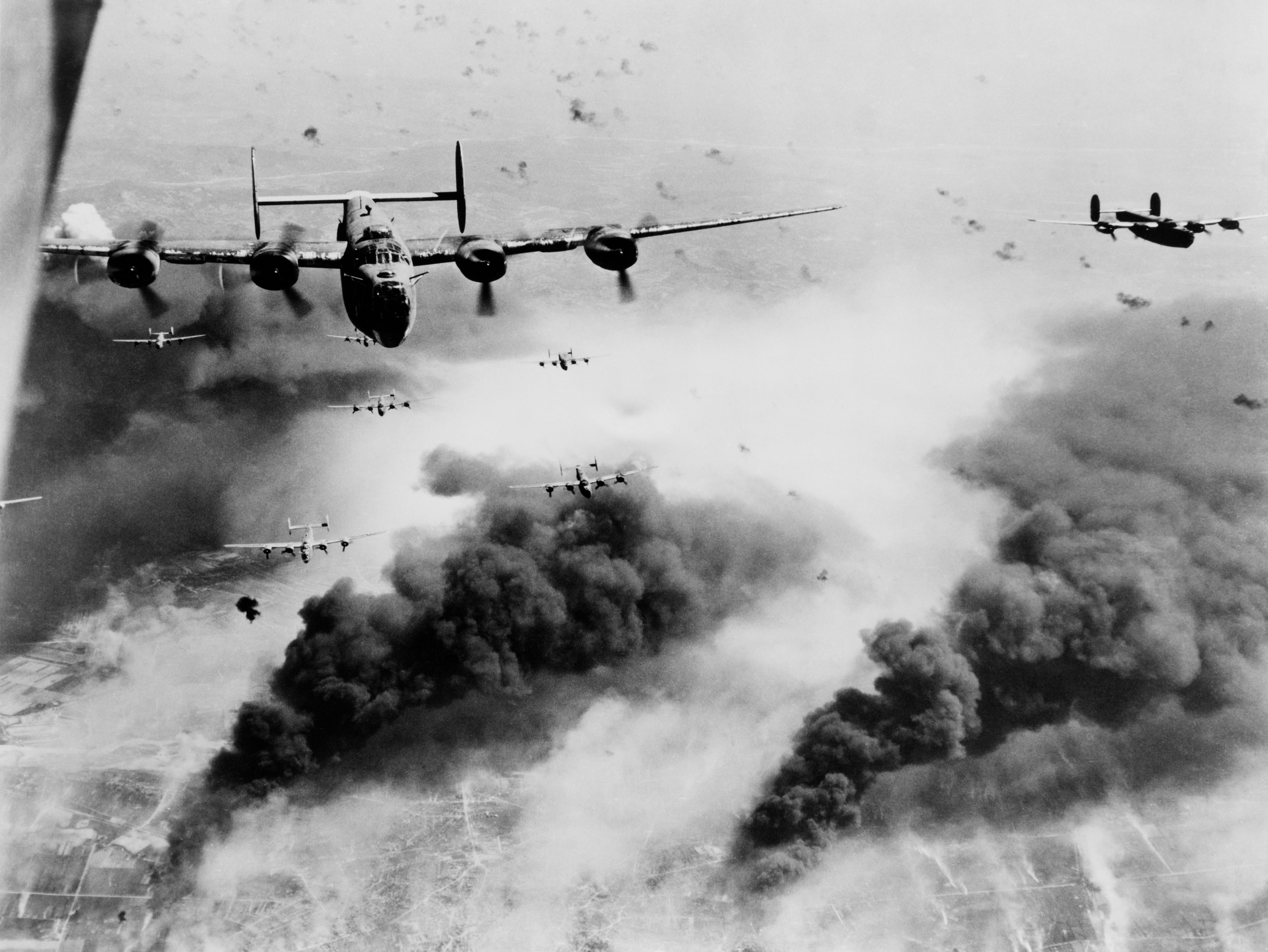
B-24s leaving Ploiești on 31 May 1944

The United States Army Air Forces first dropped bombs on Romania on 12 June 1942, during the Halverson project (HALPRO) raid against Ploiești – the first U.S. mission against a European target. Thirteen B-24 Liberator heavy bombers under the command of Colonel Harry A. Halverson from RAF Fayid, Egypt, dropped eight bombs into the Black Sea, two onto Constanța, six onto Ploiești, six onto Teișani, and several onto Ciofliceni. In all, three people were killed and damage was minor.

The bombing of Ploiești on 1 August 1943 (Operation Tidal Wave) was a far more serious affair. Tidal Wave heavily damaged four refineries and more lightly affected three; it damaged the Ploiești rail station but did not have much impact on the city itself. Câmpina was more severely damaged; 500 American aircrew were killed or captured, while petroleum exports exceeded pre–Tidal Wave levels by October.

=== 1944 ===
Anglo-American bombers first attacked Bucharest on 4 April 1944, aiming mainly to interrupt oil exports to Germany and military transports from Romania to the Eastern Front. Lasting for two hours, the operation destroyed hundreds of buildings and killed or injured over 5,000 people according to unofficial statistics. During that month, there were further daytime bombing raids on Ploiești (5 April), Bucharest and Ploiești (15 and 24 April), Brașov and Turnu-Severin (16 April), Bucharest and Turnu-Severin (21 April), as well as a nighttime bombing raid on Turnu-Severin (15–16 April).

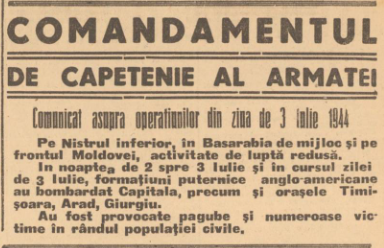
The communiqué of the Army Chief's Command regarding the operations of the Romanian Army and the bombings on Timișoara, Arad and Giurgiu on July 2/3, 1944, published in the Curentul newspaper on July 5, 1944

On the 3rd of July, over 600 B-17s and B-24s of the Fifteenth Air Force attacked targets in Romania, Yugoslavia and Hungary, in over 250 sorties, including oil storage, oil refinery, and locomotive works at Bucharest, oil storage at Giurgiu, railroad targets at Turnu-Severin, a bridge at Piatra and marshalling yards at Arad and Timisoara.

By the end of the raids on 19 August 1944, infrastructure was heavily damaged. While Romania's oil production was not knocked out, only a fraction of its products could be transported to Germany.

== German raids ==
Following King Michael's 23 August coup, the Luftwaffe retaliated from 24 to 26 August, until their bases just north of the city in Otopeni and Băneasa were bombed by the USAAF on 26 August. In the aftermath of the bombardments, many buildings in Bucharest were destroyed or damaged, and 30 airplanes of the Royal Romanian Air Force were destroyed on the ground.
