= Bombing of Timișoara in World War II =

Both Allied and Axis Powers bombings

- Part of Western Allied campaign in Romania and Strategic bombing campaign in Europe
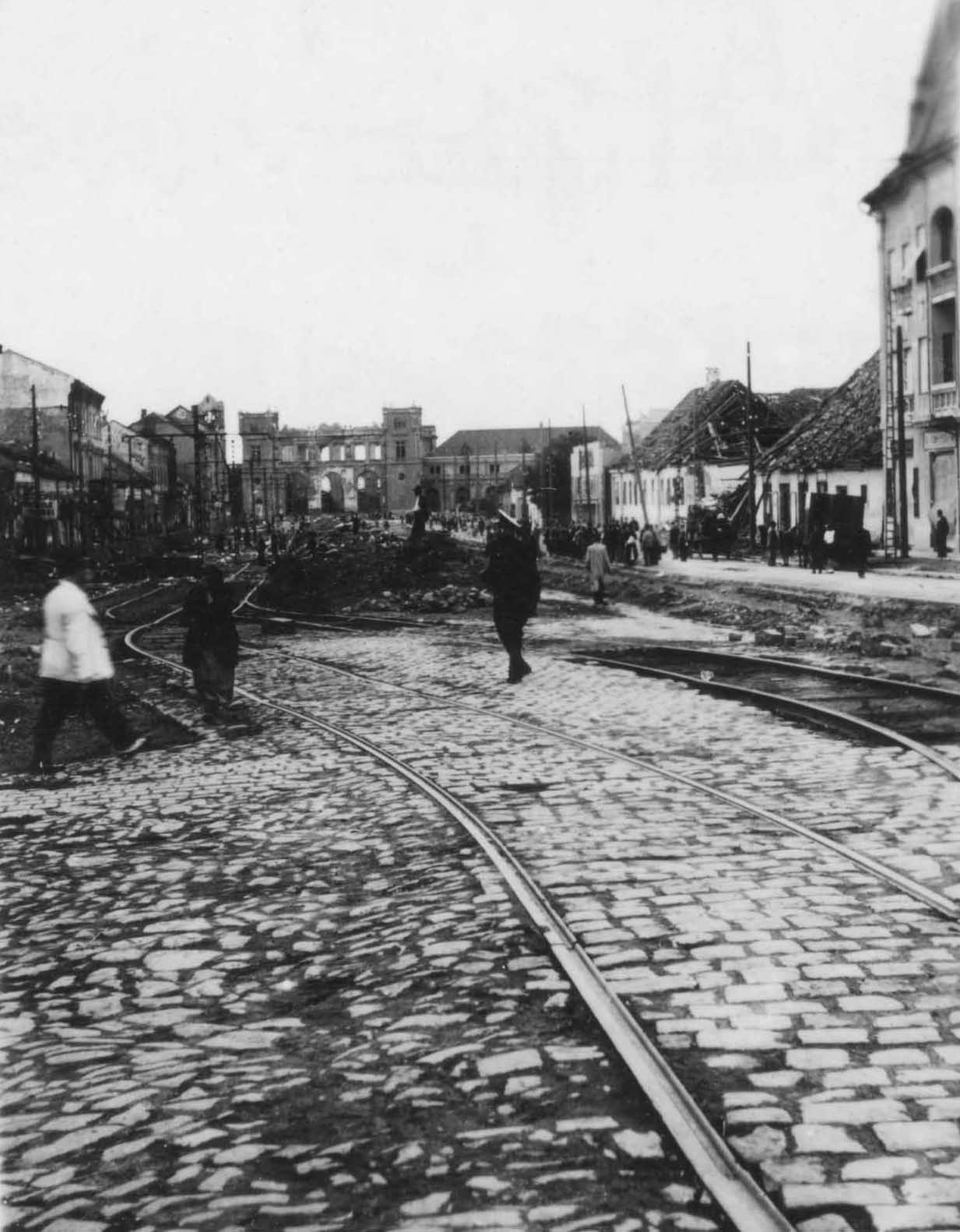
- Domnița Elena railway station in 1944, after Allied bombing raids
Location	Timișoara

The bombing of Timișoara during the Second World War comprised several distinct episodes involving both Axis and Allied forces, as well as earlier incidents between the Kingdom of Romania and the Kingdom of Yugoslavia.

The first air attack on the city took place on 6 April 1941, when two Yugoslav aircraft bombed Timișoara in the context of the German campaign against Yugoslavia, without causing any casualties.

From 1943 to 1944, the Royal Air Force (RAF) and United States Army Air Forces (USAAF) conducted both leaflet drops and strategic bombing raids over Timișoara. Following the 1944 Romanian coup d'état, the Luftwaffe and Hungarian Air Force conducted bombing raids against Timișoara.

The first Allied bombing raid against Timișoara occurred on 30 September 1943, when they conducted leaflet drops over Romanian Banat to sway local sentiments against the Axis. Subsequent Allied aerial raids until 16 June 1944 primarily consisted of leaflet drops and reconnaissance missions. An exception occurred on April 3, 1944, when Allied aircraft dropped bombs over Periam, Becicherecu Mic, Sânandrei, Variaș, Pesac, and Saravale, but these raids caused no significant damage. On 16 June 1944, a joint force of RAF and USAAF aircraft numbering 44, or according to other sources, 41, or 39 flew over the city and dropped approximately 100 tons of bombs which caused substantial damage to Timișoara, with significant impacts on the city's classification yards, industrial and local infrastructure and residential buildings. The raid resulted in 12 killed, 56 wounded and extensive destruction. Subsequent raids followed the next days continuing the destruction.

A particularly devastating attack took place on July 3, 1944, where 110 USAAF B-24 Liberators dropped 227.75 tons of bombs, in 94 sorties, leading to 90 deaths, 162 seriously injured and severe damage across the city. The bombings, which also targeted the city's classification yards, caused extensive casualties and damage to industrial and local infrastructure and residential buildings too.

Allied air raids over Timiș-Torontal County continued in July and August 1944 with more leaflet drops. After Romania switched sides to the Allies on August 23, 1944, Luftwaffe and Hungarian Air Force bombing raids on Timișoara intensified, primarily involving terror tactics such as intentionally targeting local civilians, which resulted in dozens of deaths. Such Axis raids also included leaflet drops, reconnaissance flights, and attacks on Allied supply lines and classification yards. On October 31/November 1, 1944, a joint German-Hungarian air force bombed the city, killing 10 and destroying 188 buildings.

== Yugoslav bombings ==
On 6 April 1941, in the context of the Axis campaign against the Kingdom of Yugoslavia and although Romania did not take part in the hostilities, Romanian territory became the target of Yugoslav military attacks. According to contemporary press reports, at 14:30 two Yugoslav trimotor aircraft bombed Timișoara: the first dropped seven bombs, of which only two exploded, causing no material damage or casualties, while the second dropped five bombs that shattered the windows of several railway wagons and displaced a water cistern, without causing any casualties.

On the same day, around 7 a.m., Yugoslav positions on the southern bank of the Danube shelled and machine-gunned Orșova, an incident that resulted in the death of one civilian. At 14:00, a Yugoslav twin-engine bomber attacked Arad, one of its bombs falling on a farm and injuring six people, two of whom later died in hospital.

Following these attacks, the Romanian Government lodged a formal protest with the Yugoslav Government.

== First Allied raids ==
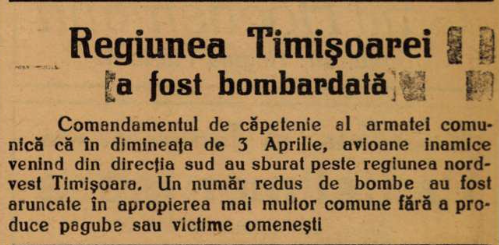
Communiqué from the High Command of the Army regarding the Allied bombing of the northwestern region of Timișoara on April 3, 1944

The first American airstrike over Banat took place on the night of September 30/October 1, 1943, following a route that included Orșova, Buziaș, Lipova, Recaș and Timișoara, and was carried out by a USAAF B-24 Liberators, which launched leaflets in Romanian over the region. At Lipova, the aircraft was attacked by anti-aircraft artillery, which damaged one of the engines, and two crew members, pilot lieutenant Gedeon Jakobson and second lieutenant radio operator Iosif Kahane, parachuted and were captured by local authorities. They had on them large sums of money in various currencies, food and medicine.

Several such raids took place between 1 October 1943 and 19 August 1944, when as part of their psychological warfare operations the Royal Air Force (RAF) and United States Army Air Forces (USAAF) distributed millions of leaflets over Banat, intending to turn local opinion against the Axis powers and encourage Romania's exit from the war. Also, some of the raids had the role of reconnaissance and overflight action, with the allied military taking photos of the most important objectives, as well as the approach trajectories to these objectives.

Allied planes flew over the northwest of the Timișoara region on April 3, 1944, and dropped bombs near several localities, such as Periam, Becicherecu Mic, Sânandrei, Variaș, Saravale and Pesac, without causing damage or human casualties.

Examples of leaflets dropped by Allied aircraft over Timiș-Torontal county
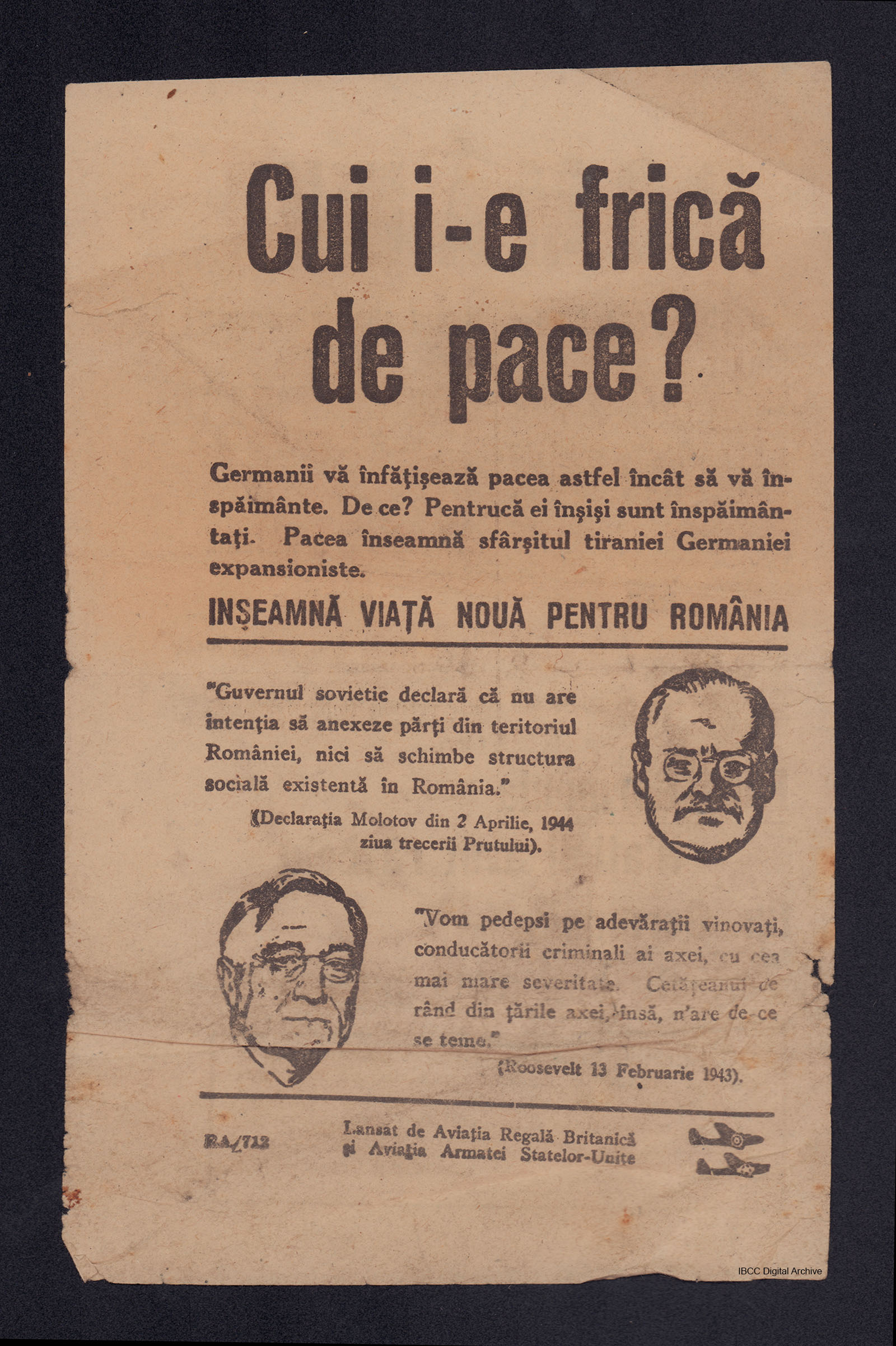

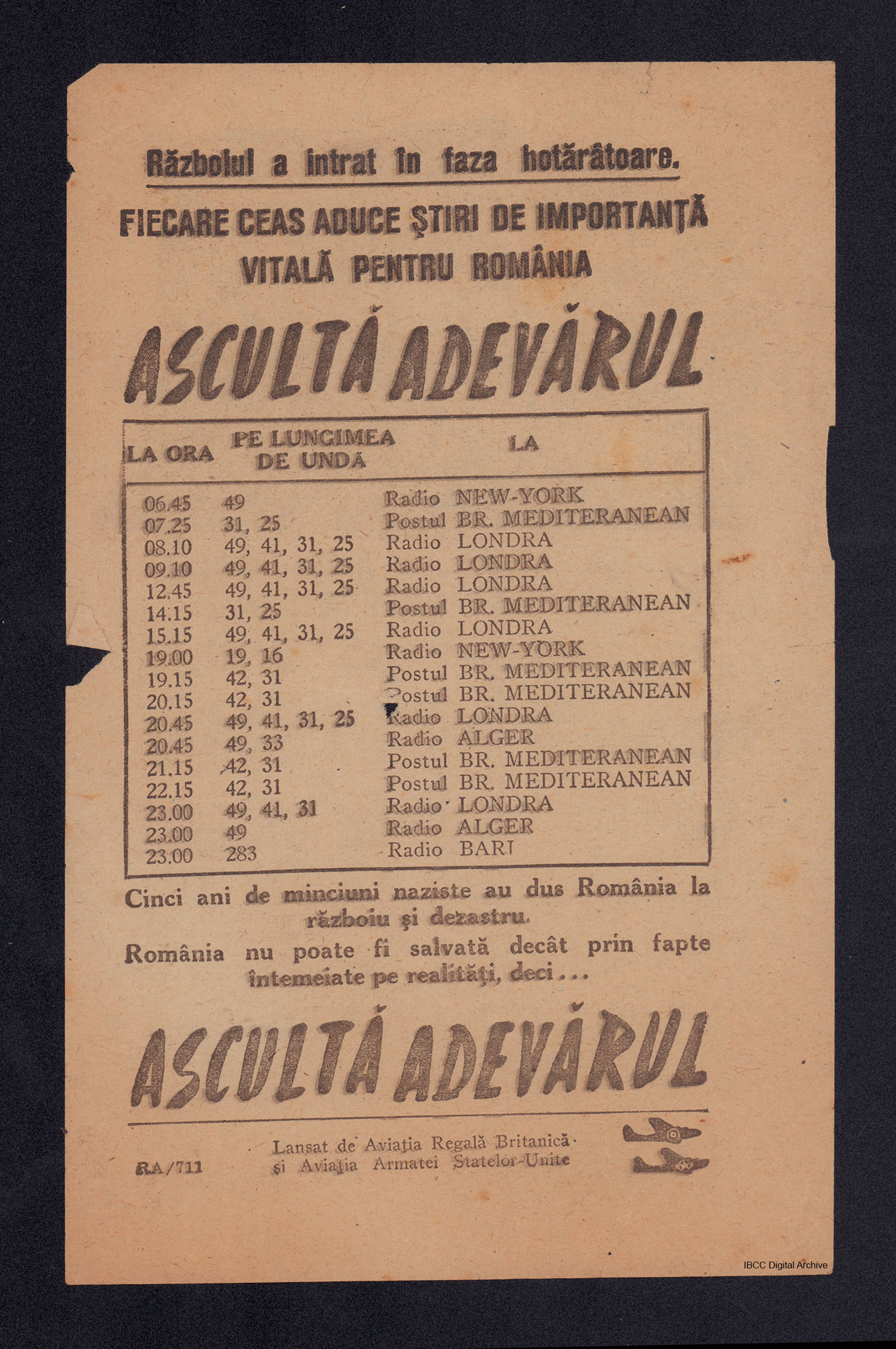

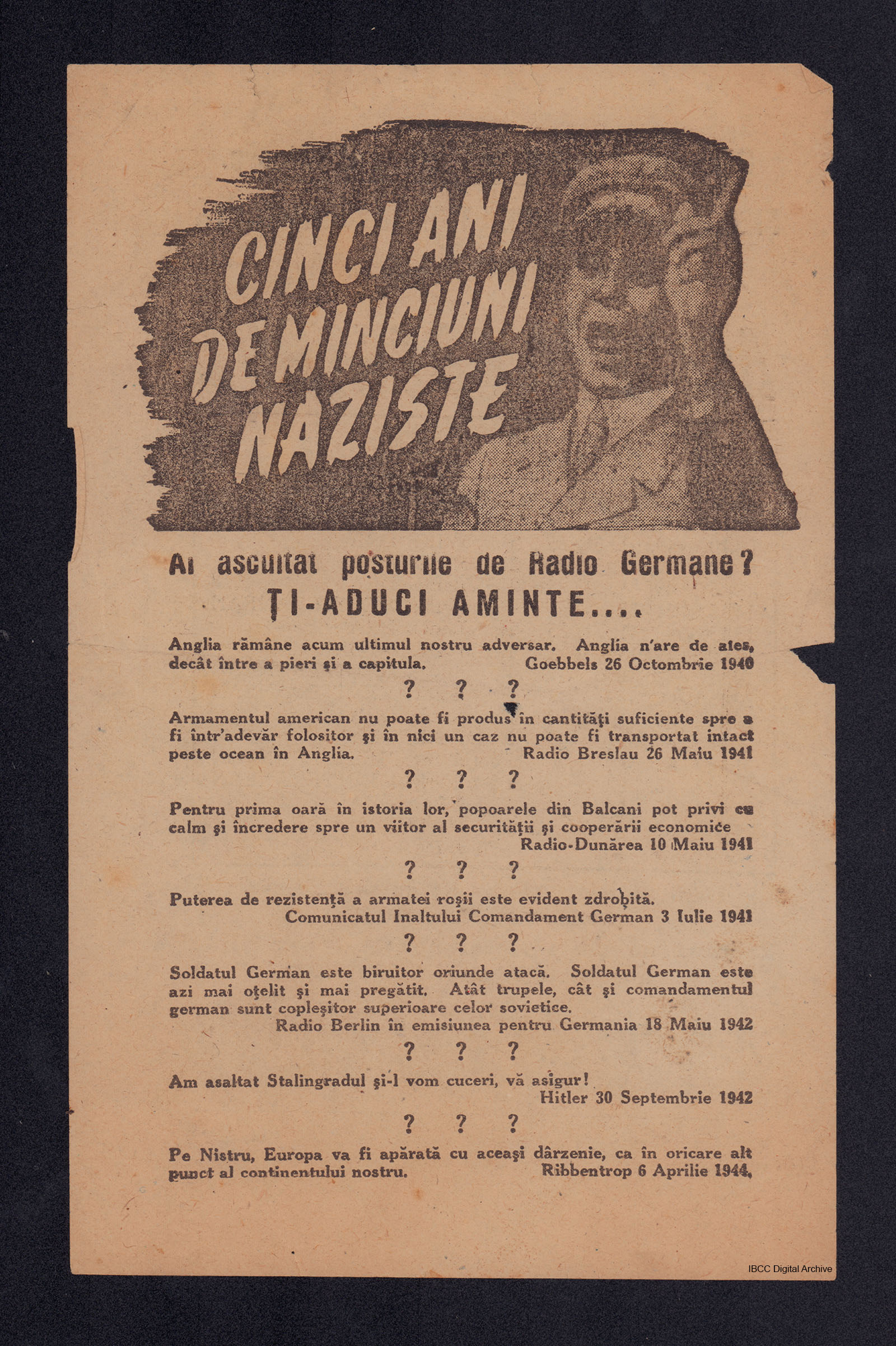

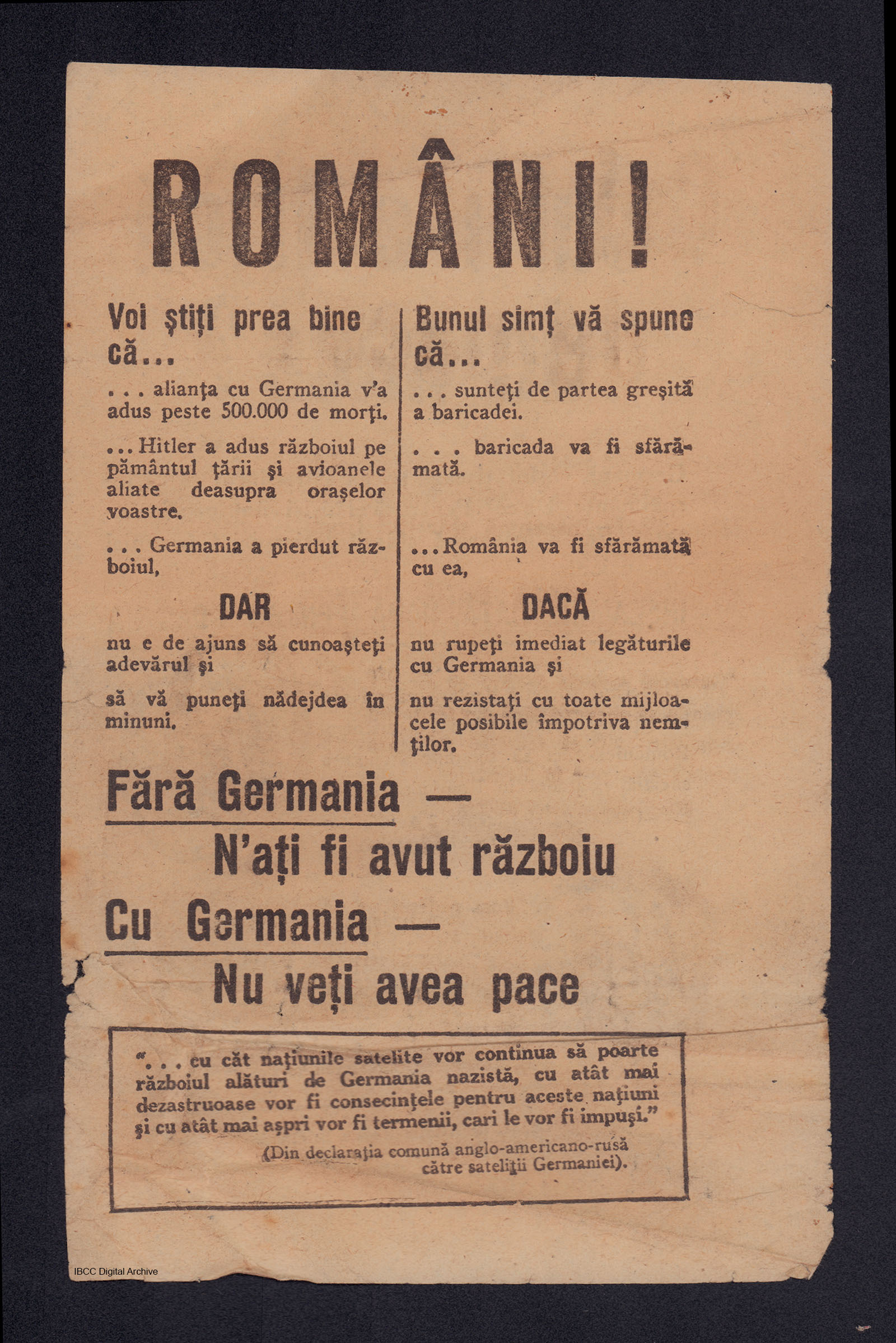

== The bombing of 16/17 June 1944 ==
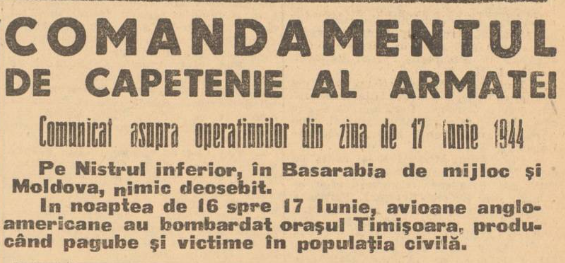
Communiqué of the Army Command regarding the bombing of Timișoara on June 16/17, 1944, published in issue 5869 of the Curentul newspaper on June 19, 1944

The first large-scale bombing of Timisoara took place on the night of June 16/17, 1944. It took place from 00:08 to 03:20 and was carried out by allied aviation, including the US Air Force's 464th Bombardment Group and 37th, 150th and 614th squadrons of the Royal Air Force.

At the time of the attack, a RAF and USAAF force consisting of 44 aircraft which had taken off from Italy near Taranto and Pescara, or according to other sources 41, or 39, consisting mainly of Vickers Wellingtons and Handley Page Halifaxes, launched luminous parachutes on the city to mark targets and dropped thousands of explosive and, in particular, incendiary bombs of the 30 lb (14 kg) and 50 lb (22.5 kg), 250 lb (112 kg) or thermite bombs, totaling approximately 100 tons of bombs. As a result of this bombing, there were initially 12 dead, 56 injured, 56 houses destroyed and 126 homes seriously damaged. The low number of victims was due, according to the media of the time, to the discipline shown by the population, which took shelter immediately after the air alarms.

Originally, 66 aircraft were assigned to this mission, but due to a last-minute order, some squadrons of the Royal Air Force's 205th Bombardment Group were assigned to Operation Brassard, where their aircraft participated in the invasion of the Elba and dropped a total of 60 tons of bombs, mainly very heavy explosive bombs.

"Domnița Elena" Railway station, its annexes, adjacent buildings, but also the railway lines were heavily affected, 15 locomotives and 83 wagons of various types were destroyed in the railway workshops, and 167 wagons on the lines of the railway station.

After the bombing, in accordance with the instructions of the Civil Defense Command, a special photojournalist was sent to Timișoara to document the damage caused. He photographed 410 premises affected by the air attack, including the Chain Factory, the Great Mill, the Tobacco Factory, the Horse Riding Club, the "Parc" Sanatorium, the General Credit Bank, the Romanian Nautical Club, the Notre Dame Institute, the Prohaska Mill, the Orthodox Church on Radu Rosetti street, School on Războieni street no. 2, C.F.R. Workshops, "Domnița Elena" Railway station, the Match Factory, the Spirit Factory, I.E.T., T.B.C. Dispensary, Metropol and Doje hotels, Lyra cinema, Romanian Credit Bank, "Globus Transport S.A." Society, Knitting Factory and numerous homes.

Among the victims of this attack were: Gheorghe Dumitru (67 years), Ioan (Johann) Kersch (65 years), Emilia Rusu, Andrei Bedo, Grigore Gavrilă, Demeter Gelga (67 years), Maria Mioc (57 years), Josef Glancz (63 years), Iuliana Ciuciu (57 years), Iulia Fekete (60 years), Mariana Ilca (76 years), and among the wounded: Ana Ronta, Pop Iuliana, Șișcovici Iosif, Obrejan Ileana, Machedon Ioan and Iașinschi Ludovic.

The bombings were repeated in the following days, with incendiary and explosive bombs being dropped that caused material and human losses. On June 20, 24 buildings were destroyed, on June 23–37, and on June 24–39.

Aftermath of Allied bombings
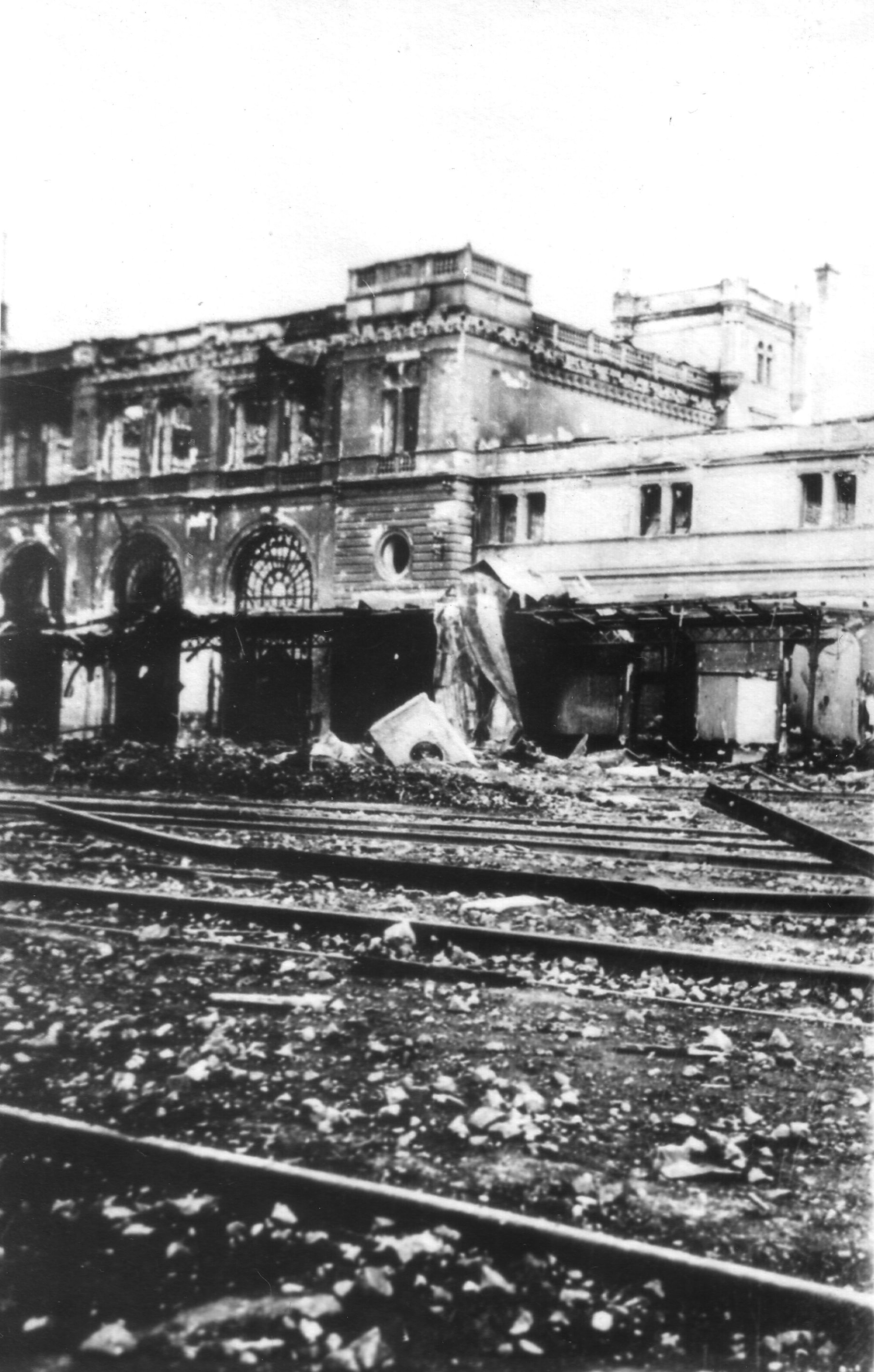

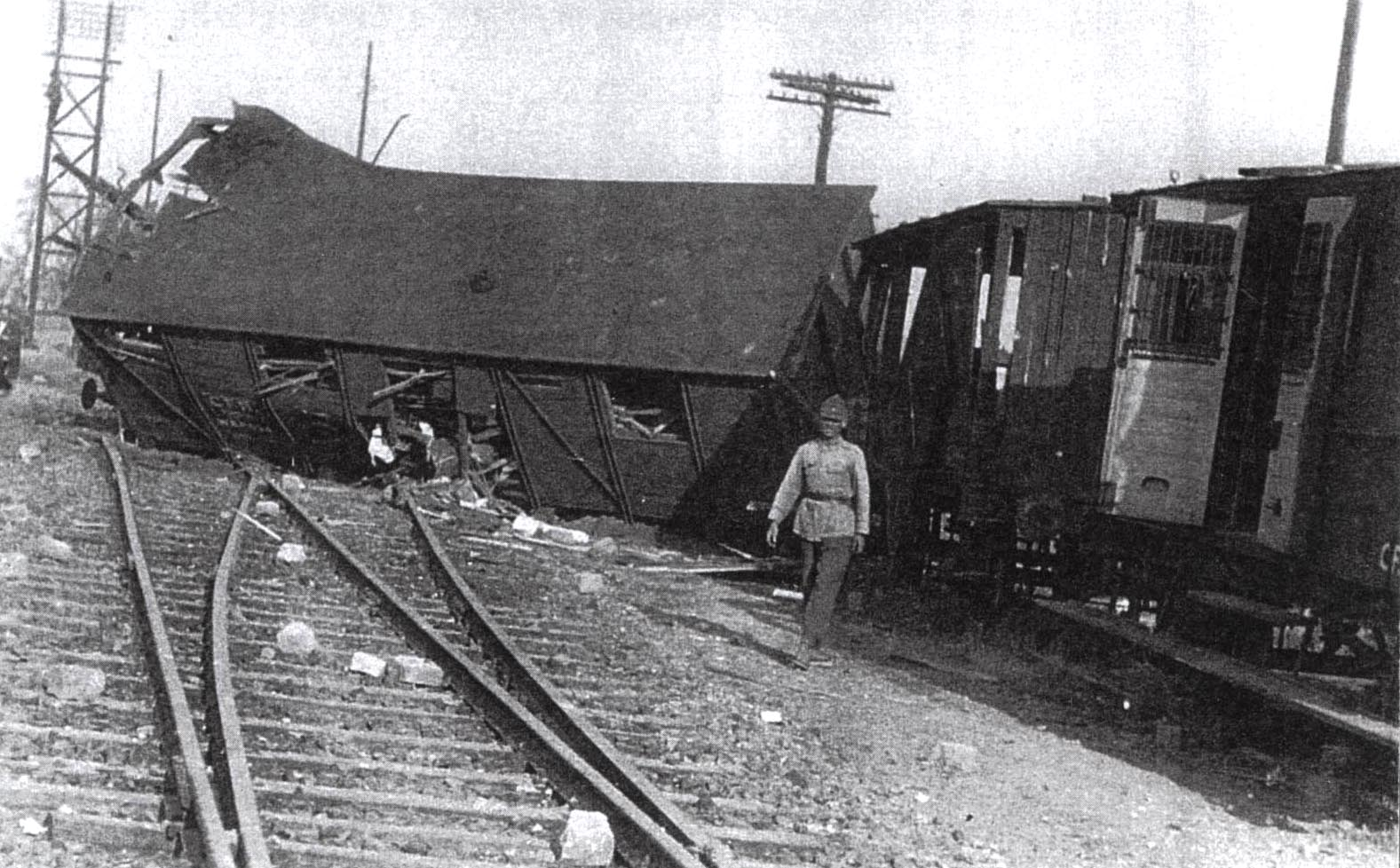

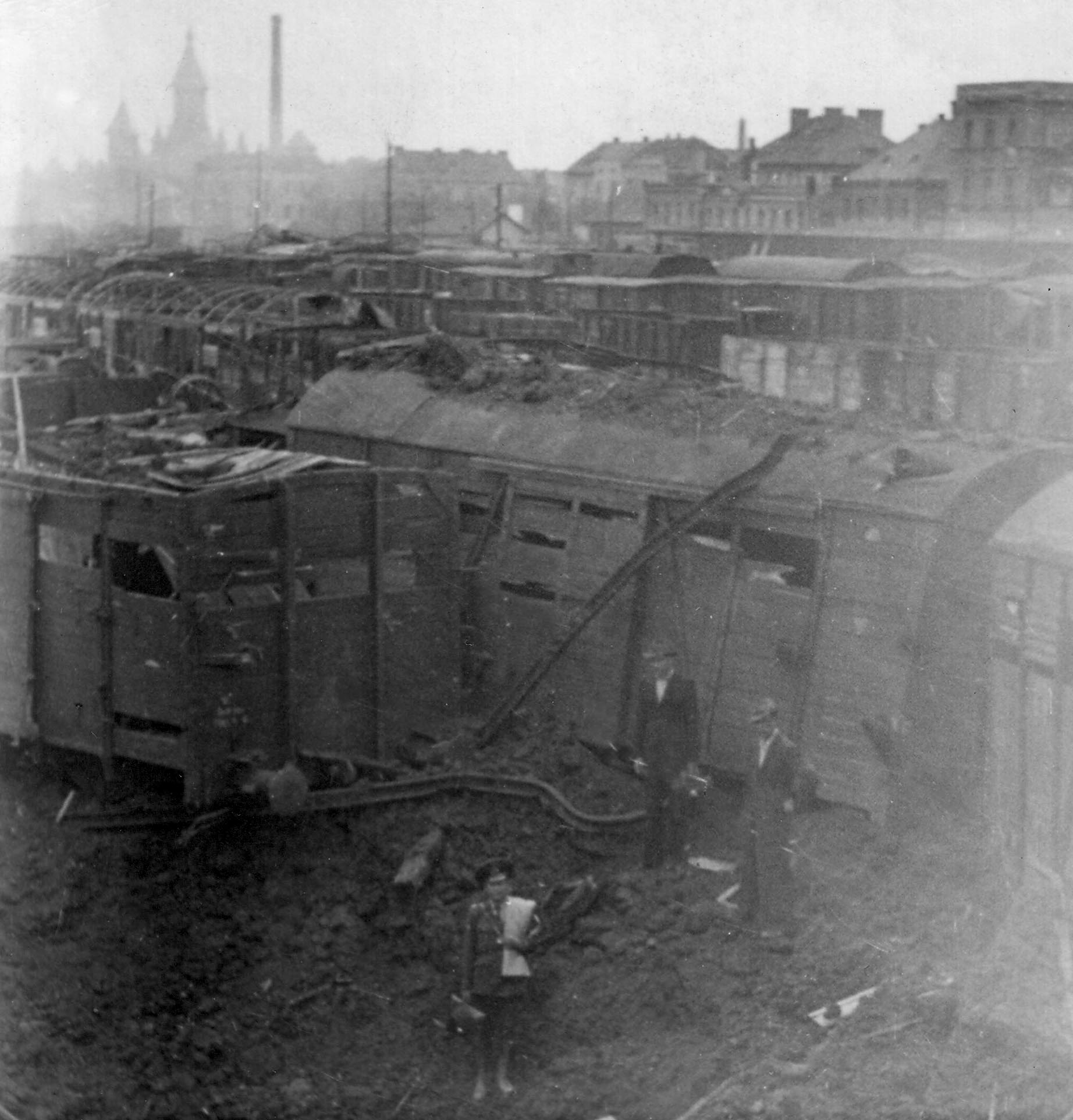

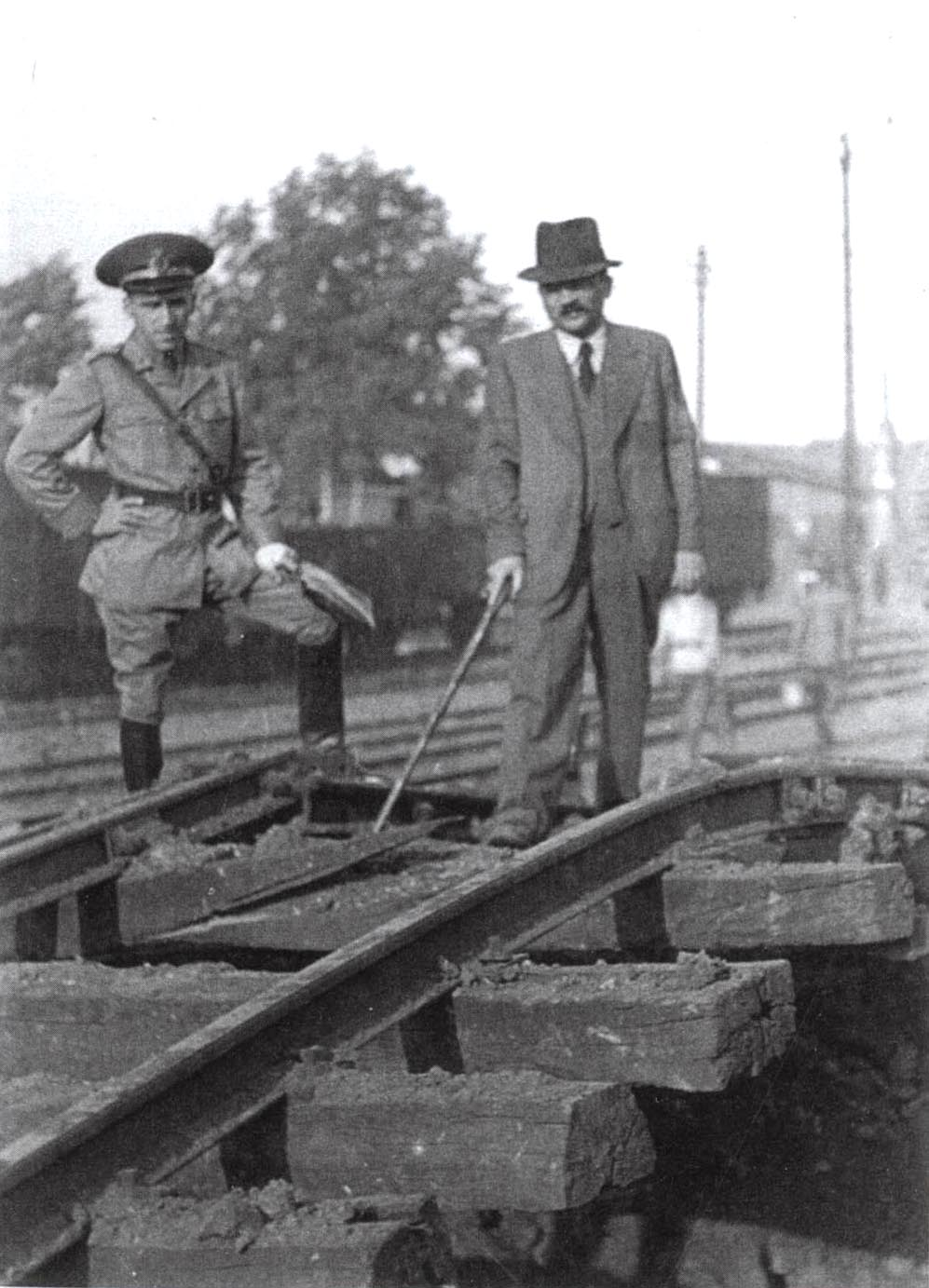

== The bombing of July 3, 1944 ==
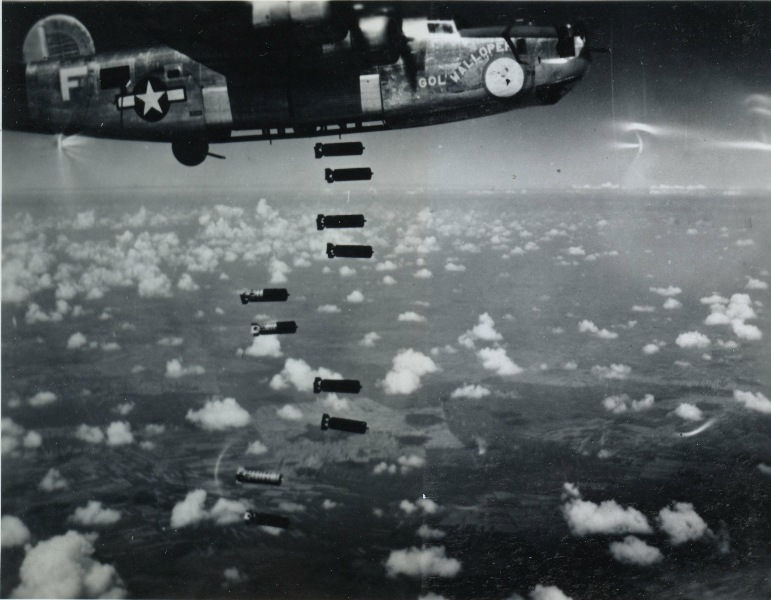
Photo of B-24 Gol'Walloper taken on July 3, 1944, by T/Sgt Tom White, a radio operator and waist gunner with the 485th Bomb Group (829th Squadron), during a mission targeting a marshalling yard in Timișoara, Romania.

The bombing took place on 3 July 1944 between 10:52 and 13:45 and was carried out by the Fifteenth Air Force's 460th, 465th and 485th Bombardment Groups. It has been described as the most destructive raid on the city during World War II. 110 B-24 Liberator aircraft, taken off from Italy, attacked in successive waves Timișoara, Turnu Severin and other localities in Timiș-Torontal County, including Chișoda, Sacoșu Turcesc, Bucovăț, Sânmartinu Sârbesc or Peciu Nou, carrying out a total of 94 sorties during which they launched a total of 257 tons of bombs, of which 227.75 tons on Timisoara, the main objective being the railway infrastructure.

Thousands of explosive and incendiary bombs were launched during the attack, causing significant destruction and a large number of casualties. Officially, 90 dead and 162 seriously injured were recorded. Numerous local buildings and infrastructure were destroyed or severely damaged, as well as agricultural land, with fires reported in grain fields. The total damage was estimated at 1,339,486,000 lei. According to a statement from the Army Chief Command, Allied aircraft machine-gunned civilians on the outskirts of cities and in fields as people tried to flee the attacks.

Among the major targets hit in Timișoara were "Domnița Elena" Railway station, where 5 deaths were recorded, the "Metropol" and "Doje" hotels, the Terminus Palace, the State Obstetric Institute, the "Parc" Sanatorium, the Center for the Protection of Children, the State Hospital for Children, the Center for the Protection of Children and the State Hospital for Children, the Chinezul Sports Clubs, Banat and CAM, the "Salvarea" voluntary association, Bancile Bănățene Unite, the headquarters of the Chamber of Commerce and Industry, a children's kindergarten at 12 Geml str., as well as various local businesses. According to eyewitnesses, the Prohaska Mill was partially destroyed, following the fall of 14 explosive bombs and more than 100 incendiary bombs, four deaths and three injuries being recorded in this place.

The most affected neighborhoods were Iosefin, Ronaț, Blascovici and Mehala, but also Fratelia and Cetate. Among those who lost their lives in the bombing were: col. Victor Romcescu, sold. Șoavă Petru, Dorner Mihai, Nicolaevici Iustina, Schaffer Iosif, Marschetky Magdalena, Szanto Ecaterina, Korasch Gheorghe, sold. Mureșan Ioan, spouses Elisaveta and Carol Iavorka, C.F.R. employees Ghenadie Lelea, Constantin Răileanu, Alexandru Iohn, Dumitru Anicolaiesei și Constantin Grigore sau Nicolau Maria, killed in the field in Tomnatic, and among the seriously injured: soldiers Andrei Constantin, Dumitru Ștefan, Sima Ioan and Șerban Florea, sergeant maj. Mârza Marin and civilians Mițiga Grigore, Volcăneț Sofia, Bâzgă Ioan, lacko Ioan, Habăr Matei, Hollengschwandner Gustav or Griind Leni.

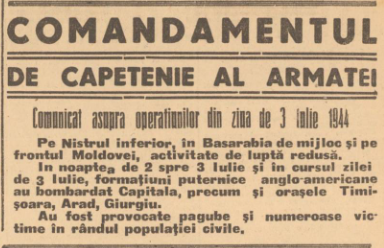
The communiqué of the Army Chief's Command regarding the operations of the Romanian Army and the bombings on Timișoara on July 2/3, 1944, published in the Curentul newspaper on July 5, 1944

RAF and USAAF air raids over Timiș-Torontal County continued in July and August 1944, including more leaflet drops during July 22, July 30/31, August 4/5 and August 13. Due to the large number of deaths and destruction, military censorship prohibited the publication of articles about the bombing, in the press of the time only communiques of the Army Chief's Command were published. After the bombings, the Timiș-Torontal Passive Defense took care of locating and extinguishing the fires, removing the rubble, salvaging property, locating the victims, providing medical aid and defusing unexploded bombs.

Aftermath of Allied bombings in Iosefin
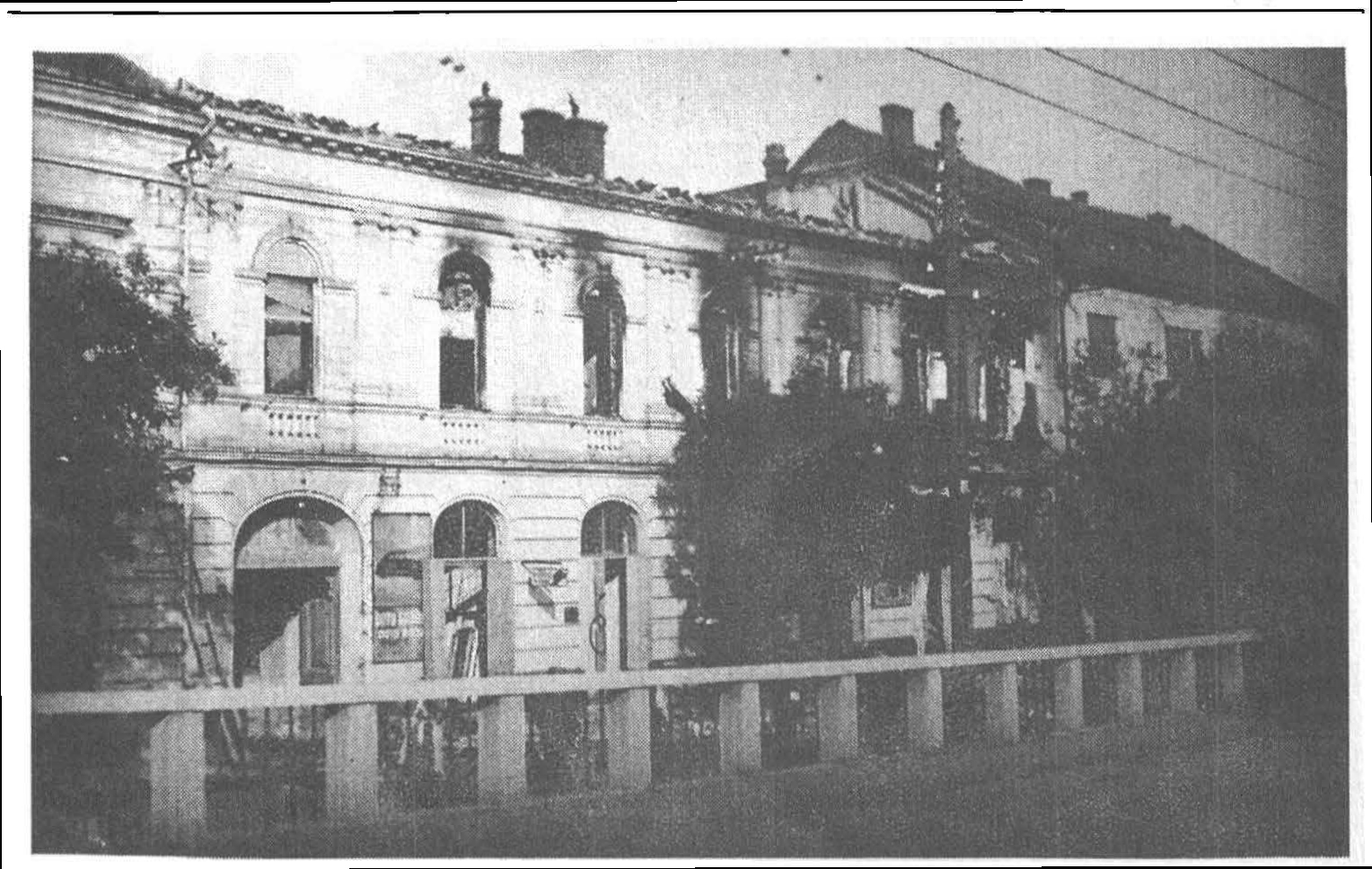

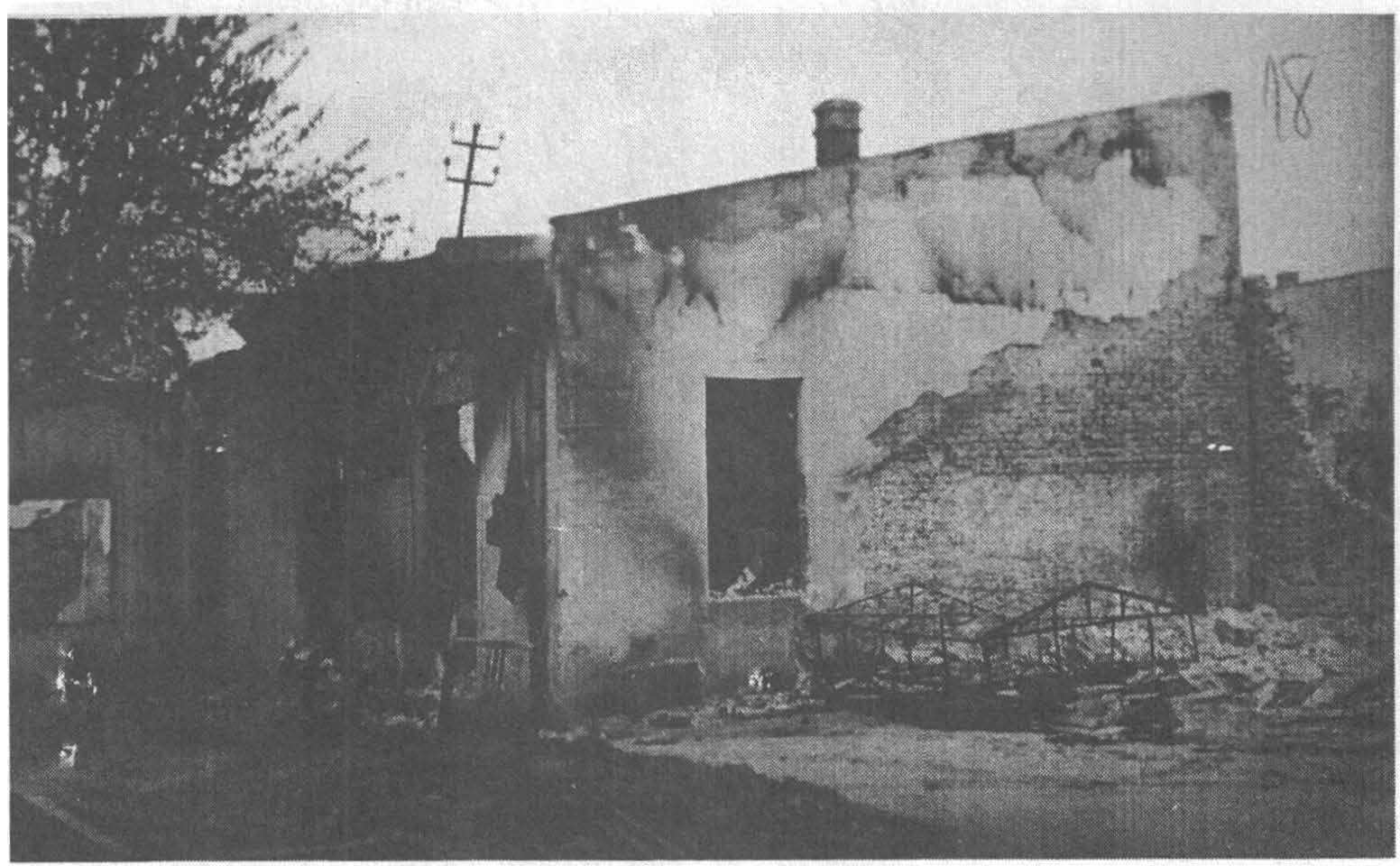

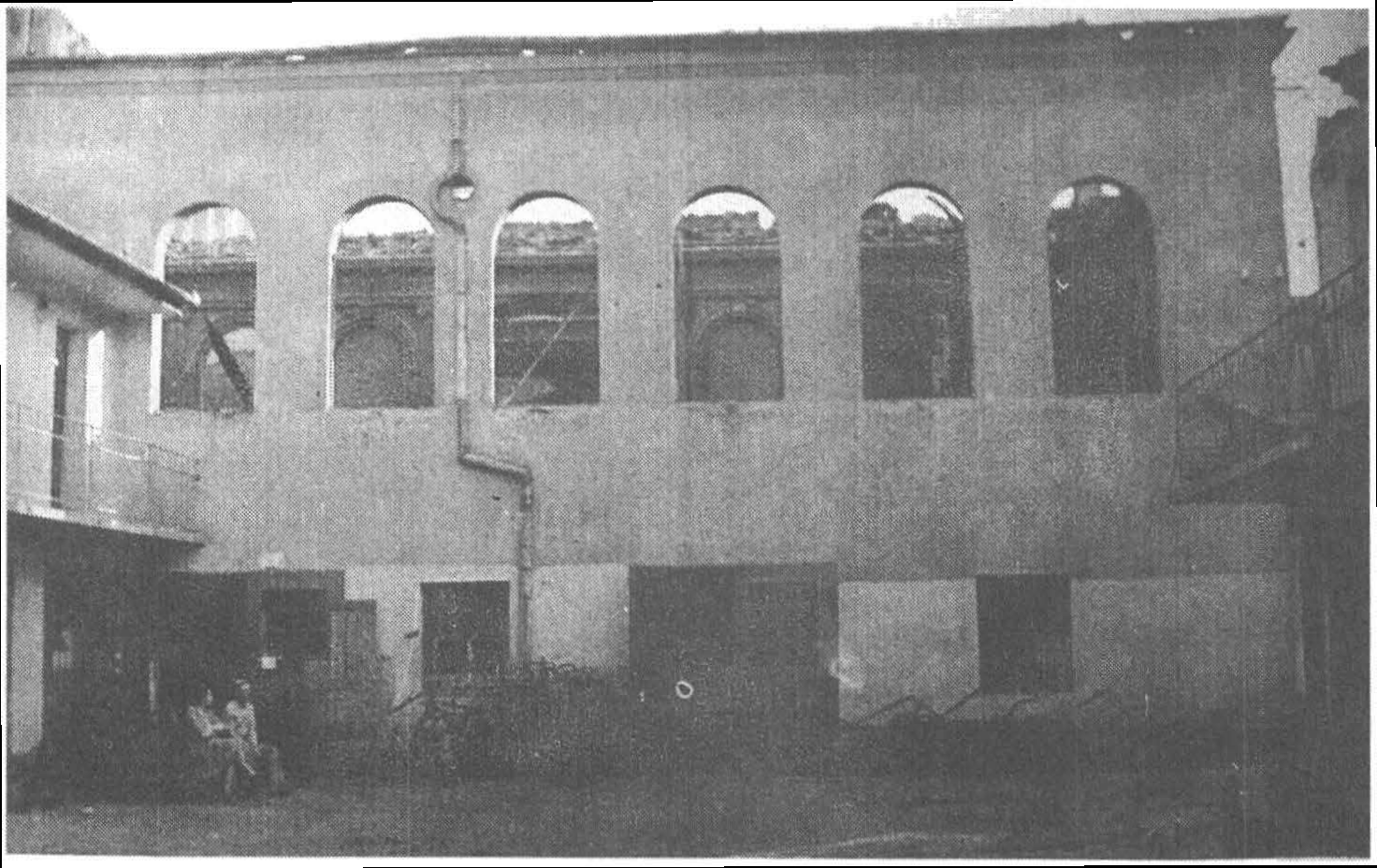

== After August 23, 1944 ==
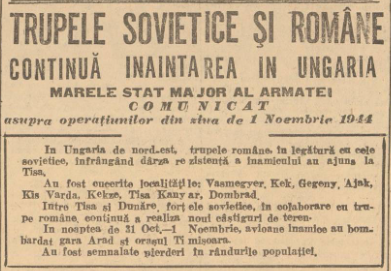
Communiqué of the General Staff of the Army, published in number 2685 of the newspaper Timpul of November 3, 1944, regarding the war operations on November 1, 1944, and the enemy bombings of Timisoara and Arad.

After the 1944 Romanian coup d'état and Romania's switch to the Allies' side, several German air raids were recorded on Timișoara.

King Michael I's Proclamation to the Nation was published in Banat newspapers only on August 26, 1944. Initially, orders stipulated that German troops should be allowed to withdraw from Romanian territory as quickly as possible. However, the German attack on Bucharest on August 24 swiftly changed this directive, leading to orders for the disarmament of the German troops.

On August 24, 1944, the VII Army Corps, operating along a 285 km front between Gilău and Deta, issued Ordinance No. 9, signed by Major General Carol Schmidt, ordering the disarmament of German soldiers. In Banat, the disarmament of German units primarily took place on August 25 and 26.

By Order no. 15003 of August 25, Colonel Alexandru Galgoți was appointed commander of the internal order in Timiș-Torontal county. In this capacity, Galgoti coordinated disarmament operations, which culminated on August 26 with the surrender of the German Command in Timișoara. Approximately 500 German soldiers were captured and taken prisoner by August 30, and they were interned in the "Huniade" barracks.

On August 25, 1944, in Vienna, Horia Sima, the leader of the Legionary Movement, who had been released from a concentration camp, formed a government in exile that issued a proclamation against the coup d'état in Bucharest, broadcasting it through Radio Donau. Horia Sima intended to establish this government in Timișoara, should German troops manage to occupy the city. On August 27, German planes dropped leaflets signed by Horia Sima and General Artur Phleps over Banat, attempting to rally the local population to their cause. On the same day, four German planes bombed and strafed the village of Vinga, including its train station and the Arad-Timișoara passenger train, killing 10 people and wounding 42 others. Bombs were also dropped by German planes in the areas of Comloșu Mic and Gottlob.

On August 28, during the day, the German air force conducted an intimidation bombing, strafing the population in Lahovary Square (now Bălcescu Square) in Timișoara. On August 29, at 1:30 PM, the Giarmata airfield was strafed, and Lieutenant Petre Negrescu, the commander of the intervention company, was seriously wounded and died a few hours later at the Military Hospital in Timisoara.

On August 30, 1944, at 7:00 PM, a German plane strafed the population of Timișoara but was driven away by anti-aircraft artillery. A similar incident occurred on September 7, with no casualties, as the German plane was shot down over the Timișoara camp.

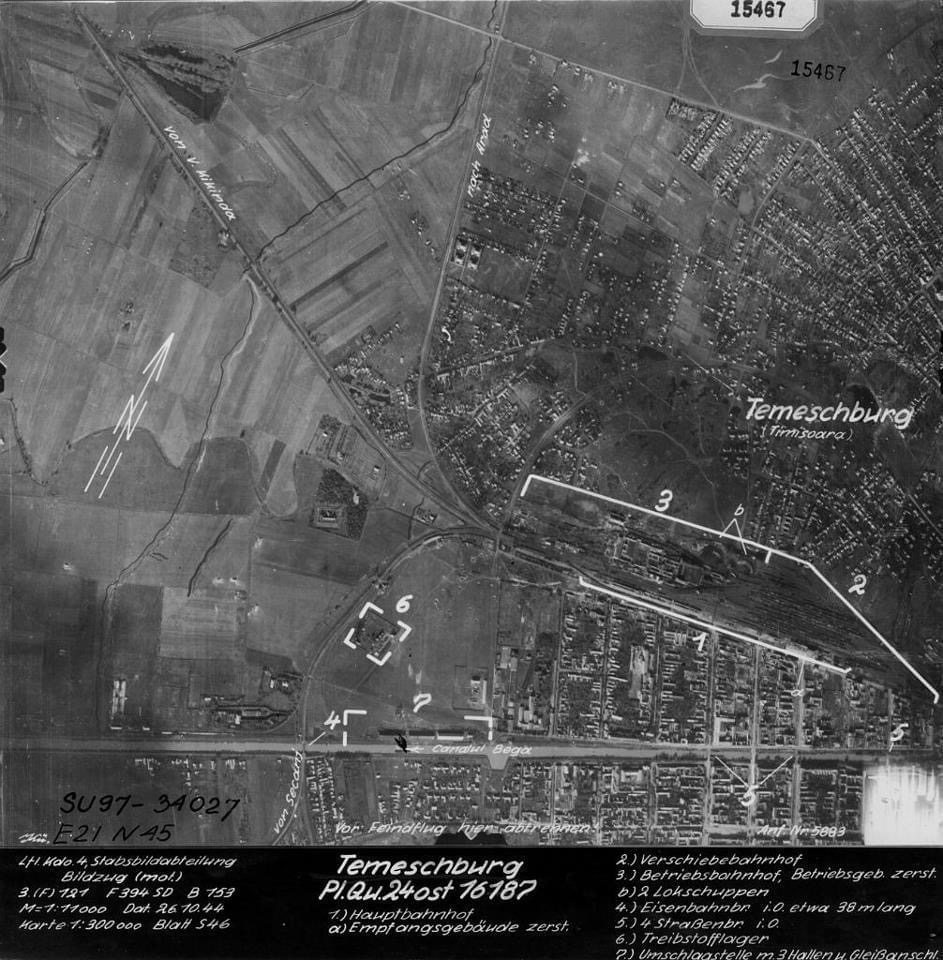
An aerial photograph taken by the Luftwaffe on October 26, 1944, shows the city of Timișoara (referred to as "Temeschburg" in German) and its railway infrastructure. The map highlights strategic targets, such as the train station, fuel depots, and various bridges.

German and Hungarian troops launched offensives north of the Mureș River and in the south of the Banat on September 5, with German aviation conducting reconnaissance flights over the Banat between September 7 and 9. During the Battle of Timișoara, on September 12, the day the Red Army entered Timișoara, the German air force machine-gunned the Fabric Railway station at 12:30, killing 8 people and wounding several more. Around the same period, România Liberă reported a machine-gun attack by a German plane on a train traveling from Lipova to Timișoara on October 25, 1944. The incident resulted in several injuries.

On September 17, 1944, Luftwaffe carried out low-altitude attacks on the railway infrastructure and Romanian supply lines around Timișoara. These attacks caused significant damage to the Lugoj railway station and the Lugoj - Timișoara rail line.

=== The bombing on October 31/November 1, 1944 ===
Between October 31 and November 1, 1944, the German-Hungarian air force bombed Timișoara in three successive waves, occurring at 6:30 PM, 10:00 PM, and 1:30 AM. As a result of these bombings, 188 private buildings were destroyed, and 10 people were killed. Among the affected buildings were the Notre-Dame Sisters Complex and the Metropolitan Cathedral. Six bombs were dropped on the cathedral, but only one exploded, causing minimal damage.
