= Dacia, Timișoara =

Residential district in Timișoara, Romania

Coordinates: 45°45′53″N 21°13′2″E

Dacia is a densely populated, mainly residential district of Timișoara. It is bounded by Calea Torontalului, Citadel Boulevard, Gheorghe Lazăr Street, and Calea Circumvalațiunii. It is the last to be built of the four sectors of the larger Circumvalațiunii; for a time it was known to locals as Circumvalațiunii II. Its current name comes from the Dacia Cinema located on the southern side of the park of the same name.

== History ==
The construction of the Dacia district began in 1970 and was completed by 1980. The neighborhood developed in two main phases—between 1970–1975 and 1975–1980—progressing gradually due to the slow relocation of the military base in the area. The first phase saw the completion of the northwestern section, bounded by Gheorghe Lazăr, Teiului, and Amforei streets, followed by expansion along Citadel Boulevard, Timiș Street, and Calea Torontalului. In the next stage, residential complexes were built in the eastern and southern parts, along with the development of the central area and its supporting facilities.
