= Mehala Roman Catholic Church =

Catholic church in Mehala, Romania

Church of the Holy Name of Blessed Virgin Mary
- Biserica „Sfântul Nume al Sfintei Fecioare Maria”
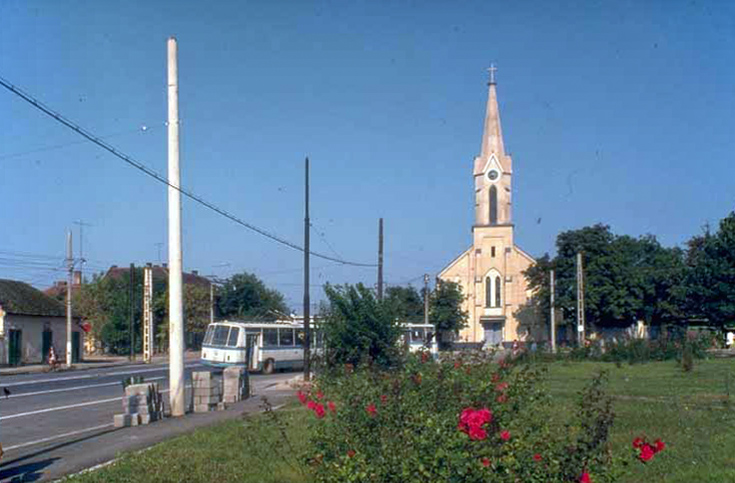
- The church in 1976

Religion
- Affiliation: Roman Catholic
- Patron: Most Holy Name of the Blessed Virgin Mary
- Year consecrated: 1887
- Status: Active

Location
- Location: 7 Avram Iancu Square, Timișoara
- Interactive map of Church of the Holy Name of Blessed Virgin Mary
- Coordinates: 45°45′53″N 21°12′17″E

Architecture
- Architect: Eduard Reiter
- Style: Neo-Gothic
- Completed: 1887

The Church of the Holy Name of Blessed Virgin Mary is a Catholic church in the Mehala district of Timișoara in western Romania. Holy Masses are celebrated in Hungarian, German and Romanian, with the possibility of being celebrated in Bulgarian in a week's time.

== History ==
The Roman Catholic believers from Mehala were initially assigned to the Timișoara-Iosefin parish. The status of parish is granted to the Mehala district only in 1922. The Roman Catholic church in Mehala was built in 1887, on the western side of today's Avram Iancu Square, with the money donated by the inhabitants of this district. In 1896 the Mehala parish was taken over by the Salvatorians. Viennese-born architect Eduard Reiter (1847–1908) was the master builder of the church, which was consecrated to the Blessed Virgin Mary on 12 September 1887.

== Architecture ==
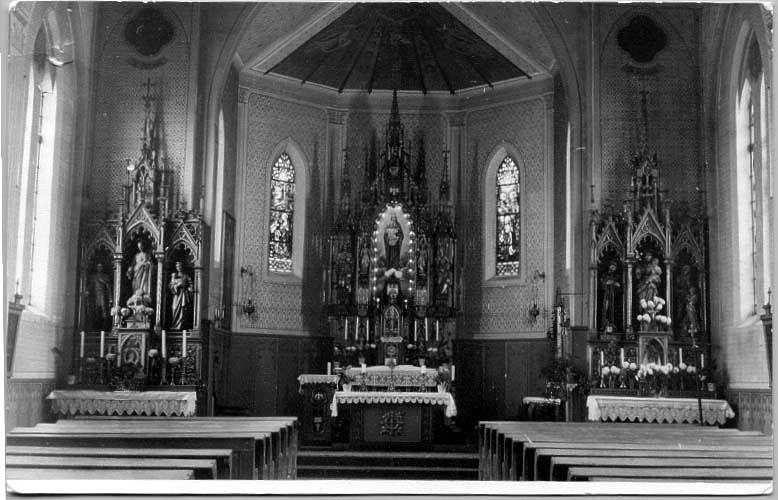
The church altar in 1976

The church was built in neo-Gothic style with neo-Romanesque elements. It has a main altar and two secondary ones executed in Gothic style by the sculptor Ferdinand Stuflesser from South Tyrol. The painting of the main altar with the Madonna and Child was remade in 1975, after an old photograph, by painter Georg Boicean from Elisabetin, a student of painter Julius Podlipny. The two stained glass windows next to the main altar show the Coronation of Mary on the right and the Annunciation of the Lord on the left and were made in 1928 in the Mayer company's Munich studio. In 1937, two more stained glass windows, also from Munich, were donated by the Müller company. The images of the twelve apostles in the nave were created by Géza Ulrich from Aradu Nou. The four bells were cast in 1921 in the König bell foundry in Arad. The pipe organ with seven registers was built by Carl Leopold Wegenstein in 1903.
