= Mehala Orthodox Church =

Church in Mehala, Timișoara, Romania

Church of the Ascension of Christ
- Biserica Înălțarea Domnului
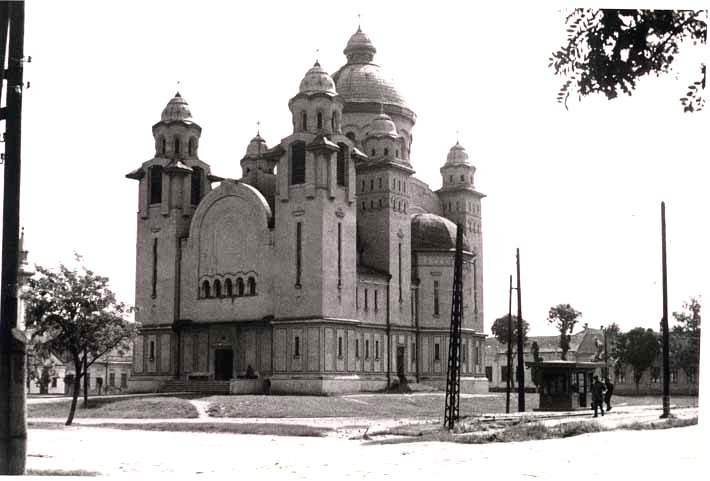
- The church in 1964

Religion
- Affiliation: Romanian Orthodox
- Patron: Ascension of Christ
- Year consecrated: 1937
- Status: Active

Location
- Location: 15 Avram Iancu Square, Timișoara
- Interactive map of Church of the Ascension of Christ
- Coordinates: 45°45′53″N 21°12′22″E

Architecture
- Architects: Victor Vlad; Adrian Suciu
- Style: Neo-Romanian
- General contractor: Josef Steiner Co.
- Groundbreaking: 4 October 1925
- Completed: 1937
- Construction cost: 14 million lei

Specifications
- Dome: 1
- Materials: Brick

The Church of the Ascension of Christ (Romanian: Biserica Înălțarea Domnului) is a Romanian Orthodox church in the Mehala district of Timișoara. It is the last in chronological order among the churches flanking today's Avram Iancu Square.

== History ==
In 1887, the Orthodox parish in this district split into a Romanian Orthodox and a Serbian Orthodox community, and St. Nicholas Church was given to the Serbian Orthodox believers. The Romanian Orthodox believers built their own church near the mayor's office, the current 4th police station, but it had to be replaced after 25 years because it was in disrepair. The construction of the current church was decided by the parish council on 29 April 1924 and the town hall offered a 3,000 square meter plot of land in Avram Iancu Square.

On 4 October 1925, the foundation stone of the new church was laid during a service officiated by the bishop of Arad, Grigorie Comșa. King Ferdinand I of Romania, Queen Marie, Hereditary Prince Carol and Hereditary Princess Ileana were present at the ceremony. An urn containing a charter signed by the king was bricked in at the foundation of the church. The church, built according to the plans of architects Victor Vlad and Adrian Suciu, was inaugurated on 10 October 1937 after a construction period of almost twelve years. A Romanian architectural style with neo-Byzantine features similar to the churches of the Old Kingdom was used. The new style marked the break between the Baroque architecture of the places of worship in the former Austrian monarchy and the new trends of neo-Byzantine inspiration, considered purely Orthodox.

The church was dedicated to the Ascension of Christ, being built in memory of the fallen of World War I. The masonry works were carried out by Josef Steiner's company from Arad. The foundation is built on a massive reinforced concrete slab. The solution was modern at the time, being also applied to the Metropolitan Cathedral. The church has a round central dome with a larger diameter in relation to its height, similar to the first millennium Greek model. The six towers also contribute to the grandeur of the church, of which the two from the main facade serve as bell towers.

The doors of the iconostasis and two linden wood polychandras were made by the Timișoara craftsman Ștefan Gajo, and the masonry iconostasis was covered with artificial reddish marble. The church was only partially painted, the tempera painting on the iconostasis, dome and apse of the altar being made by Catul Bogdan, at the time a teacher at the School of Fine Arts in Timișoara, who had learned the technique of fresco at the École des Beaux-Arts in Paris. The painter depicted Jesus Pantocrator on the vault of the nave tower and the Mother of God on the throne with the two archangels and the four evangelists in the altar. The rest of the church remained unpainted. The entire monumental edifice cost around 14 million lei at that time.

The church was in a state of rapid deterioration during the communist period, so that after 1990 the first renovation works were required. During such works, with the consent of the parish council, Catul Bogdan's painting was destroyed and the interior was completely repainted.
