= Ronaț =

District of Timișoara, Romania

Coordinates: 45.7561888°N 21.1702519°E

Ronaț (Hungarian: Rónáctelep; German: Ronaz) is a district located on the western outskirts of Timișoara. It is a district where houses and villas predominate, which means a low population density, although there are also a few apartment blocks with 800–1,000 residents. It has a mixed population of Romanians, Germans, Hungarians, Serbs, and Roma.

The settlement is located near the main railway line, where residential pavilions were built for railway workers and several company work points operated in the area. The station itself was once named Ronaț, which gave the district its name. Today, it functions as a freight terminal.

== History ==
A rural settlement from the Daco-Roman era (2nd–4th centuries AD) and an incineration necropolis from the Early Middle Ages (10th–11th centuries) were discovered here in the 1980s. Both were listed in the National Register of Historic Monuments in 2004.

Ronaț appeared around 1900 as a workers' colony. The history of this district is closely linked to CFR, most of Ronaț's inhabitants being at some point its employees and their families. Around the same period, the neighboring colonies of Blașcovici, Anheuer, and Weisz were also established. Located near the railway station and the railway line, these communities were initially administered as part of Iosefin. On 1 January 1910, when Mehala was incorporated into Timișoara as a city district, they were transferred to Mehala's administration. Subsequently, on 28 February 1910, the area was officially renamed Ferencváros.

In 1905, the Ronaț colony was granted a public library valued at 1,000 crowns as part of the National Council of Museums and Libraries of the Kingdom of Hungary's program for public and traveling libraries.

In 1906, the residents of Ronaț established a private school with the support of the Hungarian Royal State Railways. In 1909, the school was taken over by the state. Following Mehala's incorporation into Timișoara as a city district, the school was relocated to a municipal building and expanded. By 1914, it had six classrooms and two administrative offices, while the teaching staff had grown to four educators.

During the same period, an administrative office and a residence for teachers were also built, and between 1910 and 1914, a total of 26 houses were constructed. Also in 1910, the City Council approved the introduction of electric street lighting in the Ferencváros district, with plans to install 20 lamps in the Ronaț colony.

In 1925, the Holy Trinity Catholic Church was built in Ronaț at a cost of approximately 850,000 lei, funded through voluntary donations from parishioners. The church was consecrated by Bishop Augustin Pacha on 11 October 1925.

Following the establishment of Romanian administration in Banat, Ronaț continued to grow, attracting a predominantly Romanian population, many of whom had migrated from rural areas and found employment in Timișoara's industries or with CFR. Around 1925, CFR constructed four brick residential pavilions with tiled roofs, comprising 96 family housing units, approximately 85% of which were occupied by Romanian residents.

The Romanian residents sought to establish their own parish, separate from the one in Mehala. In 1929, the settlers officially petitioned for the creation of the Romanian Orthodox Parish of Ronaț, which was approved in 1930. That same year, the first parish council was formed, and in 1931, Father Ioan Jurma was appointed as parish priest. After 1930, efforts were made to secure land for the construction of a church. However, it was not until 1957 that the parish received a house donated by the Florea family, located at 38 Cireșului Street, which was converted into a chapel. The chapel remained in use until 1988, when a new Orthodox church was inaugurated at 20 Taborului Street. The church was consecrated on 13 August 1989 by Aurel Miculescu, the representative of the Archdiocese of Timișoara.

Part of the Ronaț district was affected by the floods of 1932, along with several other areas of the city, including Fabric, Fratelia, Cardoș, and Crișan. The flooding caused significant material damage across the affected neighborhoods.

During World War II, Ronaț was heavily affected by the bombing of Timișoara due to its proximity to Domnița Elena railway station and the surrounding railway infrastructure. During the air raid of 3 July 1944, six bombs struck the Roman Catholic church in Ronaț, leaving the building almost completely destroyed, with only the altar remaining standing. For a period, religious services were held in a private house in the neighborhood, first owned by teacher Hermine Muschung and later by the Marosán family. In 1946, parish priest Georg Wetzl initiated the reconstruction of the church, and in 1948 Bishop Augustin Pacha secured financial assistance of 50,000 lei from the Apostolic Nunciature to support the restoration effort. However, construction work was halted following the establishment of the communist regime and was not completed until 1964.

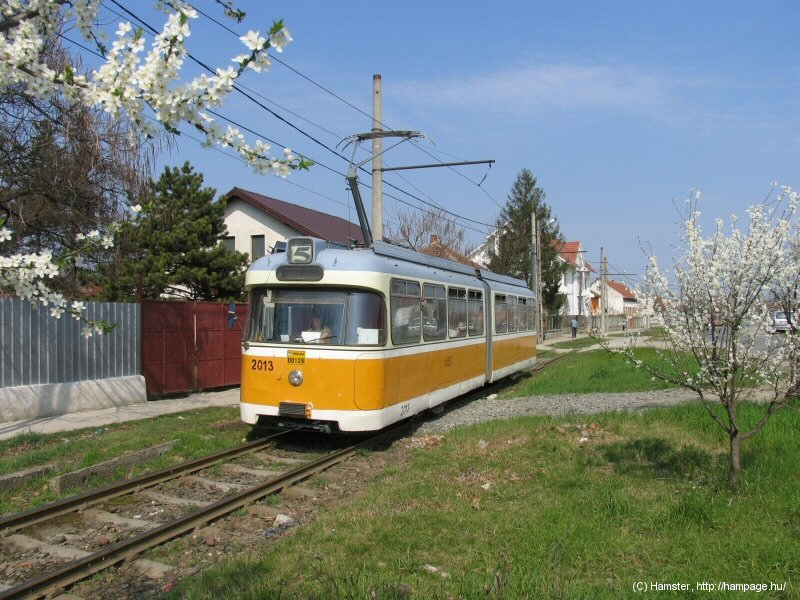
A Rathgeber P3.16 tram in Ronaț

Although a plan to extend tram line 4 from Avram Iancu Square to Ronaț had already existed since 1943, aimed at connecting the district with Cetate and with the track bed already partially constructed, the project was only completed in April 1948. The final works were carried out through voluntary labor by the UTM "30 December" Brigade. During the communist period, Ronaț was proposed for demolition, the tram line was removed, and construction permits were no longer issued.

== Population ==
Ronaț is a multicultural neighborhood that brings together members of Hungarian, German, Serbian, and Romani communities. With a population of approximately 30,000 residents, this district of Timișoara is home to about one-eleventh of the city's total population.

== Transport ==
Public transportation is provided by tram line 5, which has Ronaț as its terminus station, and bus line 13, which leads to the railway crossing, first passing through Piața de Gros.

== Gallery ==
Panorama of Ronaț in March 2019
