= Mehala =

Mehala Ferencváros (Hungarian) Franzstadt (German) Махала (Serbian)
- District of Timișoara
- Interactive map of Mehala
- Coordinates: 45°45′52.84″N 21°11′58.46″E
- Country: Romania
- County: Timiș
- City: Timișoara

Area
  - Total: 4.93 km^{2} (1.90 sq mi)
- Demonym: măhălean (pl. măhălenți)

Mehala (Hungarian: Ferencváros; German: Franzstadt; Serbian: Махала, romanized: Mahala; obsolete: Măhală) is a district of Timișoara. Mehala evolved from a slum-like village (in Turkish mahale means "slum") to a neighborhood of houses, villas and many gardens. It is one of the oldest satellite villages of Timișoara and was built in the higher part of the city, west of Palanca Mare. It officially became part of the city in 1910.

== Name ==
The Austro-Hungarian administration conferred the name Franciscin (Hungarian: Ferencváros; German: Franzstadt; Serbian: Францштат, romanized: Francštat) in tribute to Emperor Francis I (1768–1835); however, this designation was not adopted by the indigenous population. During the interwar period, it was temporarily renamed Principele Mihai, after soon-to-be King Michael I, but the name saw only limited use, sharing the same fate as Franciscin.

== Geography ==
The district covers an area of 4.93 km^{2}. The historical settlement extended from the outskirts of the Iosefin neighborhood northwestward to Dudești and Sânandrei. It also encompassed the Seliște, Cioca, and Dealul Flămând tarlals, as well as the Cioca Forest.

At present, it includes the areas of Blașcovici, Bucovina, Mircea cel Bătrân, Ovidiu Balea and Ronaț and is administered by a neighborhood manager employed by the city hall.

== History ==
=== Antiquity ===
Mehala was supposedly inhabited in the pre-Dacian period. An Eneolithic settlement was identified here in the 1970s. Further archeological excavations brought to surface several ceramic fragments from the classical Dacian period (1st century BC–1st century AD) and the Árpád dynasty (11th–12th centuries). A Sarmatian necropolis dating from the 2nd–4th centuries BC was also discovered here in 2025.

=== Ottoman occupation ===
Mehala has long been an independent commune, whose name comes from the Turkish language, mahale meaning "slum" or "suburb". This name was given to it during the Turkish occupation of Banat, between 1552 and 1716. Travelers coming from the west often stopped here, after the gates of the fortress closed, being forced to spend the night at the inns or in the stables in the area. Here was the summer residence of the Ottoman pashas, known as the "Wells of the Pashas" (German: Paschabrunnen), where the ahidnâme was signed in 1716; the Turks had previously been defeated in the fortress of Timișoara by the Habsburg troops led by Eugene of Savoy. The residence is said to have been connected to the fortress by underground passages. In times of danger, they were safe supply and escape routes. The Wells of the Pashas were later renamed Präsidentengarten and were used by local leaders as a place of relaxation until 1849 when Timișoara was besieged by revolutionaries and the residence was completely destroyed. In the many decades of Turkish rule even slight offenses were severely punished. This could be the reason why the few people who settled here chose to live as far away from the fortress as possible.

=== Habsburg rule ===
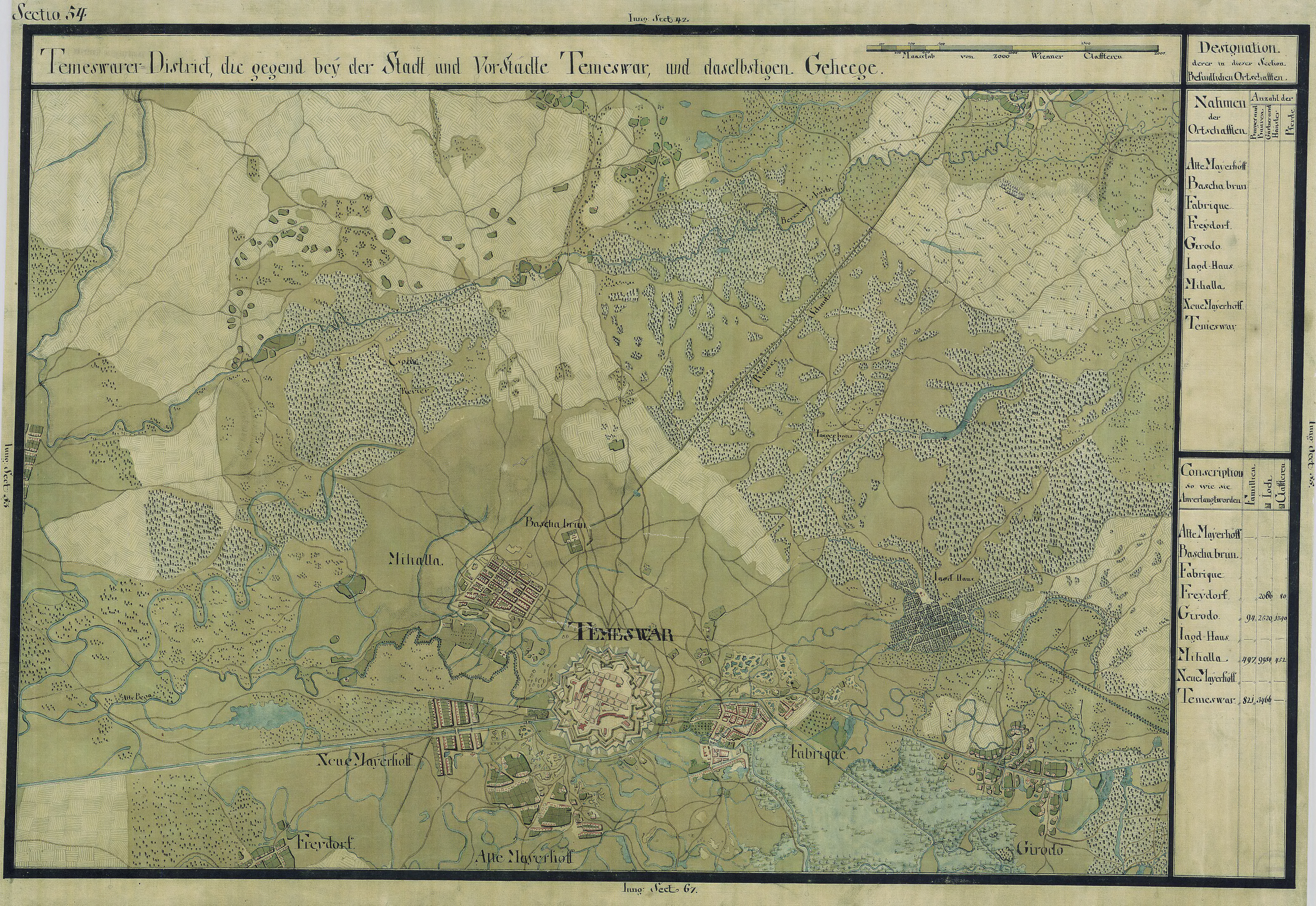
Mehala (Mihalla) in the Josephinian Land Survey of 1769–1772. Depicted here are also the Wells of the Pashas (Baschabrun), east of Mehala.

For the next 65 years Mehala was made part of the city and in 1716 it received the name Neustadt (which in German translates as "new city"; Hungarians called it Újváros). In 1723, during the construction of the new fortifications, which were extended far beyond the Turkish palisades, Palanca Mare had to be demolished. Since the Orthodox Rascians (collective term for Romanians and Serbs) were not allowed to settle in the fortress at that time, many of them moved to what is now Mehala. After the fire and plague of 1738, the Romanian population of Mehala increased considerably. By 1744 Mehala was subordinated to the Rascian magistrate of Timișoara. In 1779 the Banat of Temeswar was incorporated into Hungary and divided into counties. The villages and estates, which were all in the possession of the Vienna's Imperial Chamber, were put up for auction. Mehala was also a Chamber estate, but being considered a suburb of Timișoara, the settlement was ceded in 1782 by the Chamber without auction to Timișoara, which requested Mehala at an estimated price of 101,482 florins and 32 ½ kreutzers. After the death of Emperor Joseph II (1790) many of his decisions and contracts concluded during his reign were annulled. This also happened with Mehala's contract of sale. As the price agreed in 1781 in the "Deed of privilege of the free city" was not paid to the Chamber by the city, the actual handover of Mehala did not take place. Mehala was thus separated from the city and placed under the control of the administration of the Temes County as an independent village under the name "Mehala". This led to lengthy legal disputes over land ownership.

Between 1860 and 1914, Mehala saw its number of streets double—though the 70 streets remained without sewers—and its number of houses also doubled, with the 1,000 homes typically consisting of a single floor and an average of two rooms. The number of small artisan workshops, often established by craftsmen displaced from Fabric, Cetate, or Iosefin by large-scale industry, grew tenfold, exceeding 150. Apart from the Leopold Weiss tile factory, there was no factory or large industrial enterprise in the commune. Over time, the village gradually became an agrarian and artisanal extension of the city. Beginning in 1900, four colonies were established in Mehala: Ronaț, adjacent to the railway line where houses were constructed for railway workers; Anheuer; Blaskovits; and Calea Szegedului (now Calea Torontalului).

Northwest of Mehala, as far as Săcălaz, Dudeștii Noi and Sânandrei, there was an old deciduous forest – Cioca Forest. In a small settlement of the same name, robbers are said to have lived and caused mischief for a short time. People went hunting, collected mushrooms and used the forest as firewood. Within 80 years it was cut down and converted into arable land.

=== Annexation and following years ===
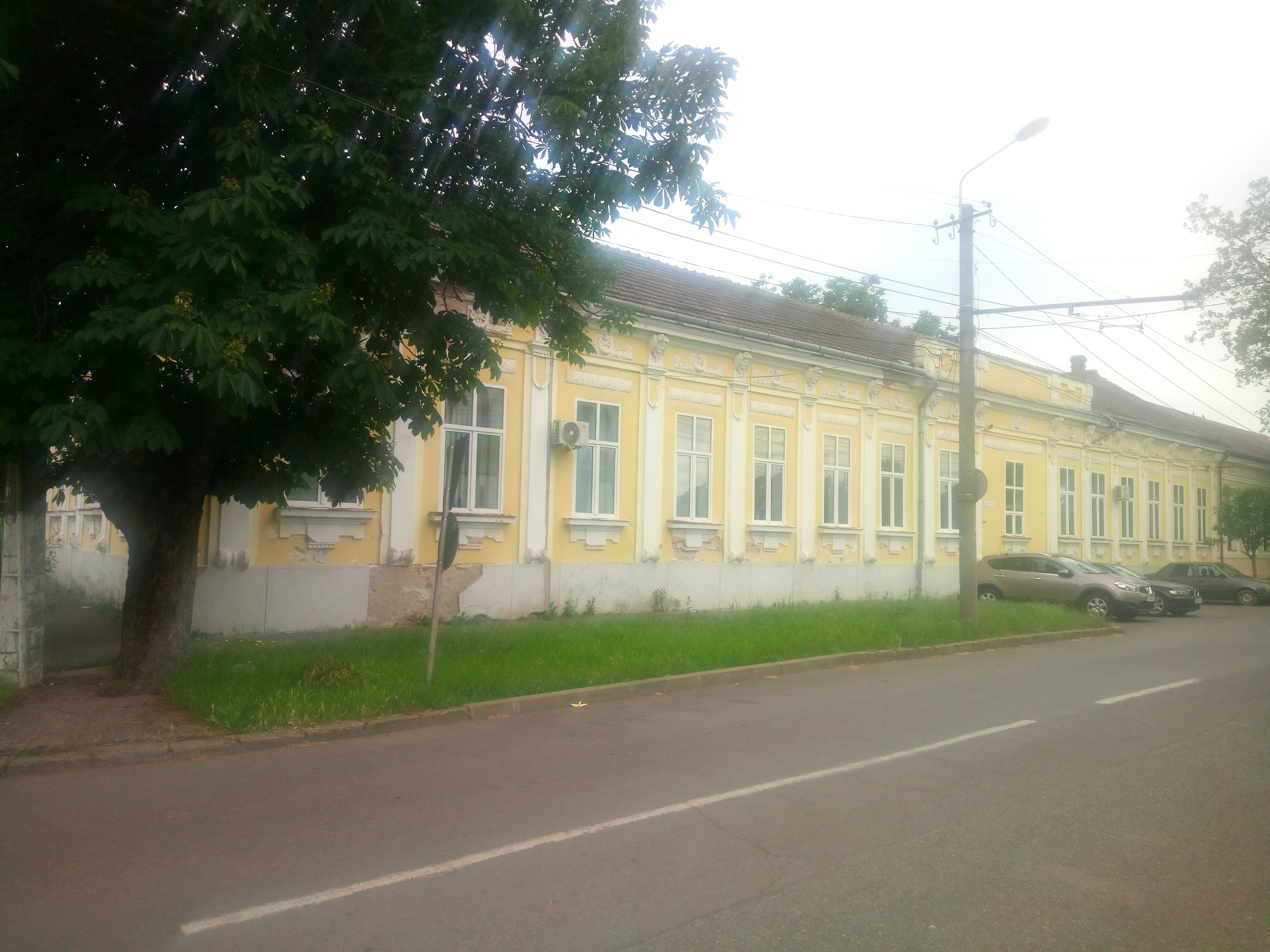
The former mayor's office in Mehala

In 1848, Timișoara's patronage over Neustadt ended, and in 1850 the settlement became an independent municipality with its own administration. The village had previously been put up for auction by the Hungarian Parliament in Bratislava in 1830.

No purchaser was found for the village, where the interests of Timișoara were evident. After a decade of negotiations, a judicial ruling on 1 January 1910 resolved the land ownership disputes in Mehala. The Supreme Court decision intended that Mehala be officially assigned under the new name of Franzstadt (lit. "Franz's city") as the 5th constituency of Timișoara. The handover was made in a festive setting, in the town hall, by deputy count Sándor Ferenczy and mayor Carol Telbisz. Mehala was to be represented in the Municipal Council by Alexander Hermann, József Egyed, Ioan Pavlovits and Petar Petrovits.

In 1910 Mehala had 8,797 inhabitants, out of which 3,149 Germans, 2,419 Romanians, 2,275 Hungarians and 832 Serbs. Due to its ethnic and confessional structure, Mehala is considered a Banat in miniature, evidenced by the three churches – Serbian Orthodox (the oldest), Romanian Orthodox and Roman Catholic – located in the square that today is called Avram Iancu. From now on, Mehala has experienced a vertiginous development: roads to the city and sidewalks were paved, street lighting was introduced and kindergartens and schools were established. In 1923 Mehala was connected to the Timișoara tram network; since then line 4 has connected Avram Iancu Square with the central Liberty Square.

During the communist years, an important attraction of the district was Ócskapiac. Goods smuggled from Serbia or Hungary were sold here. Today, the market in Mehala has expanded a lot and includes a bazaar and a flea market. Between the old city limits of Timișoara and Mehala an undeveloped stretch of land remained – as a green belt until 1964, after which the expansion of Circumvalațiunii began from the west. A pond that serves as a natural rainwater reservoir, Balta Verde ("Green Pond"), was used for ice skating in winter, but was then filled in and built on, as was a meadow to the north, a former military training area. Many old houses fell victim to the expanding new housing developments by the end of the 1980s. In 1968, the tram was supplemented by a second electric means of transport, the Timișoara trolleybus (firobuz). The new trolleybus line 13 ran from 1968, initially to Cetății Boulevard, then from 1970 parallel to the tram to Avram Iancu Square and finally from 1978 to Grigore Alexandrescu Street on the western edge of the city. On 21 June 2006, however, it was converted to conventional bus operation.

== Demographics ==
Historical population
| Year | Pop. | ±% |
|---|---|---|
| 1850 | 3,375 | — |
| 1870 | 4,621 | +36.9% |
| 1880 | 4,121 | −10.8% |
| 1890 | 4,965 | +20.5% |
| 1900 | 6,196 | +24.8% |
| 1910 | 8,797 | +42.0% |
| 1956 | 14,083 | +60.1% |

From 1744 onward, civil records in Mehala documented the population, including details such as ethnicity. The residents of Mehala comprised Serbs, Romanians, Germans, Hungarians, Jews, Greeks, and Roma. The ethnic makeup of Mehala, based on census data up to its incorporation into Timișoara, is as follows:

| Census | | Ethnic composition |
| Year | Population | Romanians | Hungarians | Germans | Serbs | Slovaks |
|---|---|---|---|---|---|---|
| 1880 | 4,121 | 1,797 | 243 | 1,191 | 719 | 8 |
| 1890 | 4,965 | 1,972 | 431 | 1,595 | 818 | 17 |
| 1900 | 6,196 | 2,284 | 512 | 2,563 | 757 | 6 |
| 1910 | 8,797 | 2,419 | 2,275 | 3,149 | 832 | 44 |

== Education ==
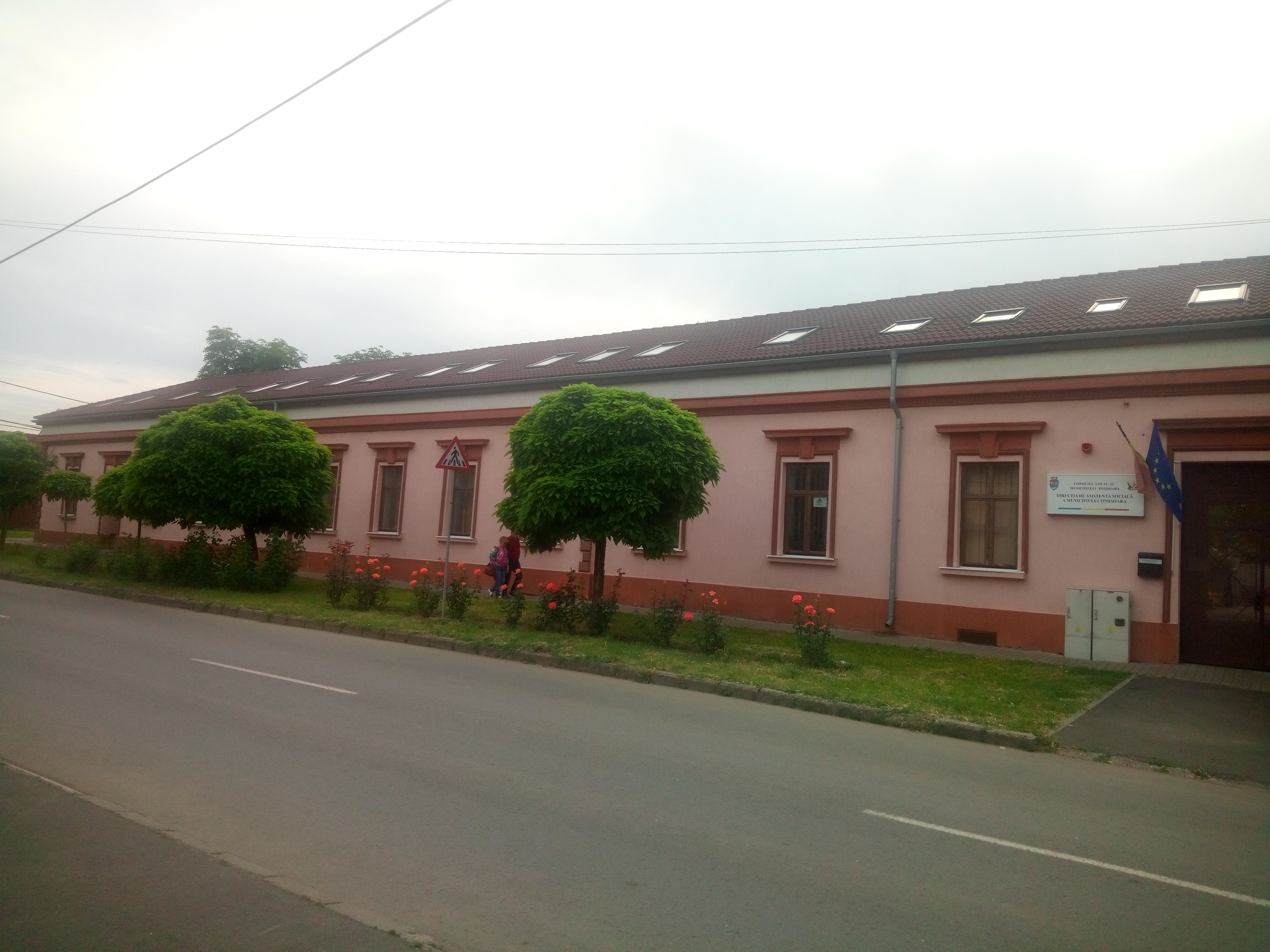
The former elementary school in Mehala, today the social assistance directorate

Education in Mehala began in family homes and church settings, before the establishment of formal schools offering instruction in Romanian, Turkish, and Slavonic, and later in Hungarian and German.

The first Romanian school in Mehala has been documented since at least 1723, during the period of the Turkish occupation, when the local Romanian community was already well organized, as noted by the Banat chronicler Nicolae Stoica from Hațeg. At that time, it was the only state-run school in Timișoara, all other schools being communal. Archival records indicate that a new school building was constructed in Mehala in 1773, and in 1778 a class with Serbian as the language of instruction was established. According to a report submitted to Vienna, during the 1788–1789 school year, the school in Mehala had 30 boys and 20 girls enrolled and employed two teachers; Romanian was the primary language of instruction, and German was also taught.

The school located in Avram Iancu Square originated as a Franciscan institution in the 14th century, later functioning as a Reformed school, and, until 1919, as a Roman Catholic confessional school administered by a monastic order, with grades I–IV taught in German and grades V–VI in Romanian. By 1935, the school in Mehala comprised ten classes: five in Romanian, three in German, one in Serbian, and one in Hungarian. Since 1990, it has been named after Avram Iancu.

== Avram Iancu Square ==
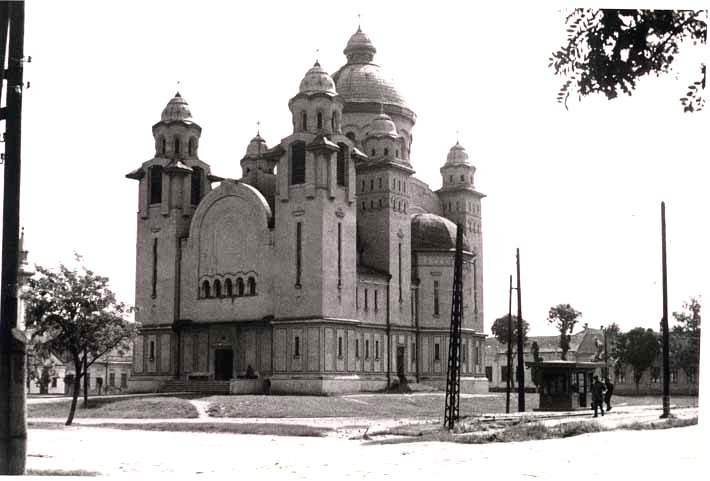
The Romanian Orthodox church in 1964

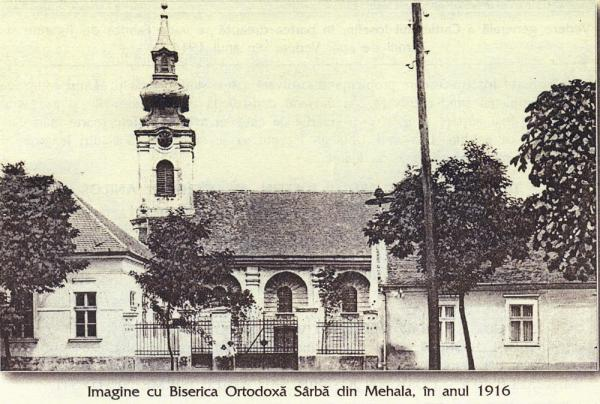
The Serbian Orthodox church in 1916

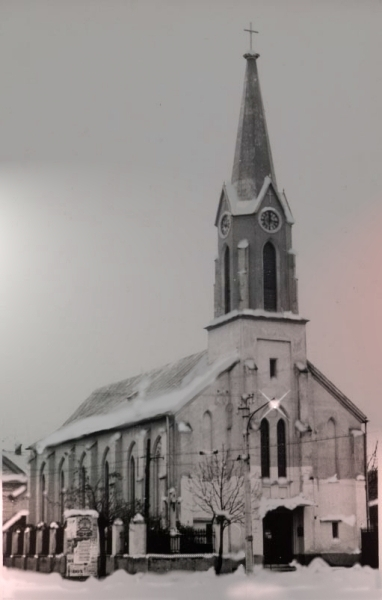
The Roman Catholic church in 1960

Avram Iancu Square, nicknamed the "square with three churches", is the central square of the district, where the Romanian Orthodox, the Serbian Orthodox and the Roman Catholic churches are located. The Serbian church dedicated to Saint Nicholas was the first church in Mehala. It was built of brick between 1786 and 1793. This church served both Serbian and Romanian worshipers, with services held in both languages, until the hierarchical separation of the Romanian Church from the Serbian Church. During the Hungarian Revolution of 1848 the church was transformed by the revolutionaries into a stable. The church once had a confessional school, a football team and a choir called Zora.

The second-oldest church is the Roman Catholic one; it was built in 1887 with money donated by the Catholic inhabitants of Mehala. It rises on the western side of the square and stands out for its neo-Gothic style with neo-Romanesque elements.

The Romanian church, also called the Mehala Cathedral due to its imposing dimensions, was built between 1925 and 1937 in neo-Byzantine style. The plans of the church were made by architects Victor Vlad, professor at the Polytechnic School, and Adrian Suciu, the chief architect of the city. The groundbreaking ceremony was attended, among others, by King Ferdinand I, Queen Marie and princes Carol and Ileana. The church is dedicated to the Ascension of Jesus and commemorates the Romanian martyrs who fell during World War I.

== Notable people ==
- Petre Bădeanțu (1929–1993), footballer
- Zoltán Beke (1911–1994), footballer
- Vasile Deheleanu (1910–2003), footballer
- Rudolf Kotormány (1911–1983), footballer
- Dumitru Pavlovici (1912–1993), footballer
- Grațian Sepi (1910–1977), footballer
- Lazăr Sfera (1909–1992), footballer
- Aladár Szoboszlay (1925–1958), Roman Catholic priest
- Mihai Tänzer (1905–1993), footballer
- Béla Uitz (1887–1972), painter
- Emerich Vogl (1905–1971), footballer
- Rudolf Wetzer (1901–1993), footballer
