= Bucovina, Timișoara =

Coordinates: 45.7696031°N 21.2148179°E

Bucovina is a residential neighborhood situated in the northern part of Timișoara, Romania. It is named after the homonymous street and features Ion Vidu Park, redeveloped in 2009 with a marine-themed landscape. The design symbolizes a pod of whales surfacing in the ocean, which inspired the local nickname "Whale Park."

Like other northeastern areas (e.g., Aradului, Torontalului), it was developed during the late communist era, with a construction push after 1980 to accommodate workers in major state-run factories. The buildings are predominantly spacious apartment blocks, constructed under stricter post‑1977 earthquake standards for safety and comfort.

== Transport ==
The neighborhood is served by multiple express and standard bus lines including E1, E2, E6, and metro-style buses M41–M44, M50, all reaching stations within about 10–15 minutes' walk.
