= Blașcovici =

Coordinates: 45.7555579°N 21.1986243°E

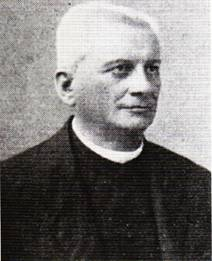
Franz Blaskovits

Blașcovici (deprecated: Colonia Blascovici; Hungarian: Blaskovitstelep; German: Blaskowitsch Kolonie) is a district of Timișoara. At the beginning of the 20th century, Blașcovici was a colony of Mehala. Before that, a wealthy family of Roman Catholic canons, the Blaskovits, lived here. One of the family representatives, Franz Blaskovits (1864–1937), remained in the local memory as a defender of the rights of the Germans in Banat and was the proponent of the establishment of the so-called Republic of Banatia. It is said that they had a house somewhere near the former headquarters of the Traffic Police, from where, so far as Ronaț, the garden of their estate stretched. The parcelling of the area began around 1900; the first streets in the district appeared on the place of the former garden.

== Etymology ==
According to a theory proposed by historian Mircea Stanciu, Blașcovici may have originally been intended as the "neighborhood of pure Romanians." The name's etymology, he suggests, derives from the term vlas, meaning Vlach—a historical reference to Romanians. Around the year 1000, under the influence of medieval Latin, the initial "v" in vlas is believed to have shifted to a "b," giving rise to the modern form of the name.

Even today, over 90% of Blașcovici's residents are Romanian, though over time, several Hungarian families have also made the neighborhood their home.

== Transport ==
Blașcovici is served by a single double tram line—line 5—put into use as a single line during the communist years. Bus lines E1, E3 and M43, as well as trolleybus lines 11, 14, M11, M14 and 18 also have routes that reach close to Blașcovici.
