= Circumvalațiunii =

District of Timișoara, Romania

Coordinates: 45.7653572°N 21.195234°E

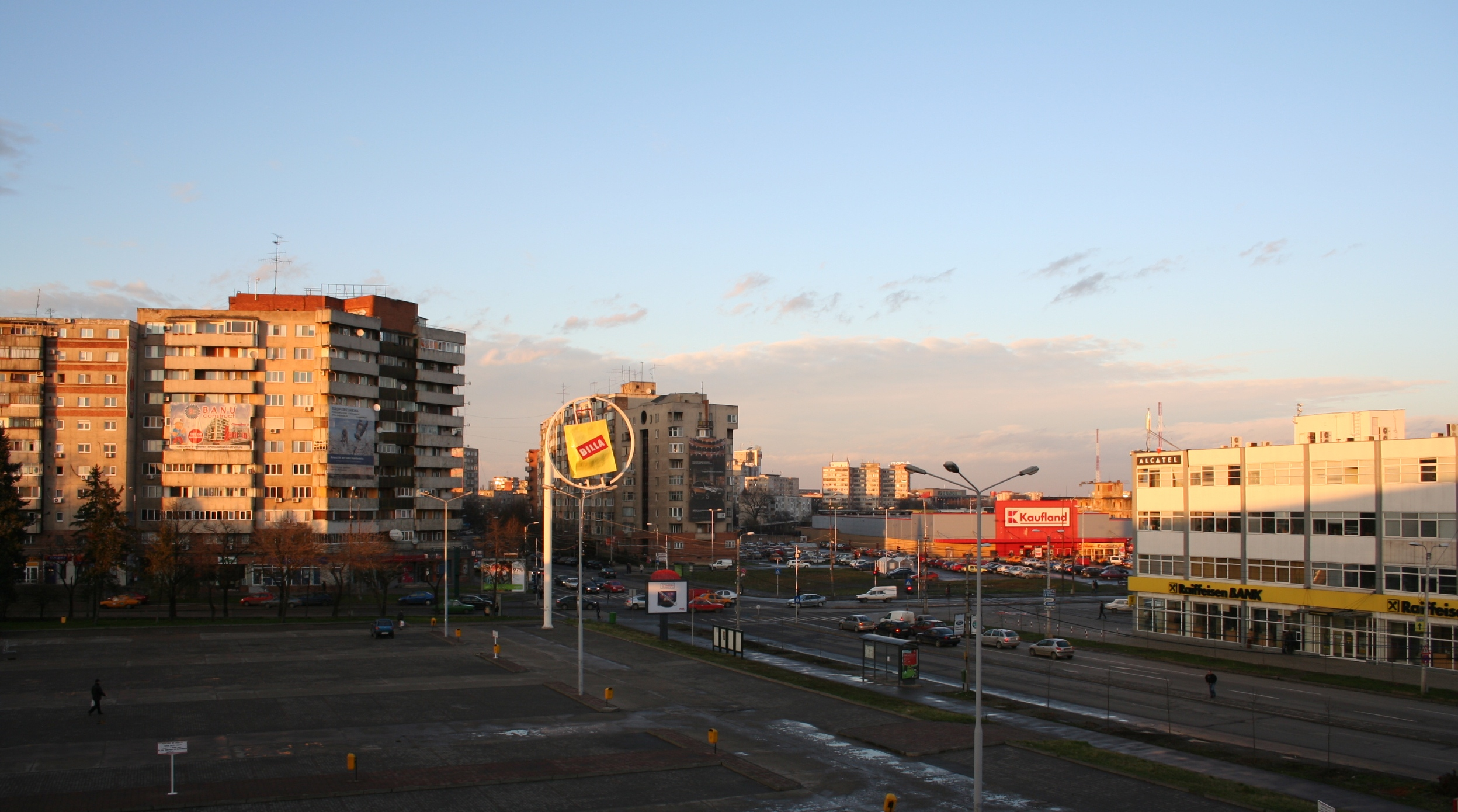
Circumvalațiunii in 2008

Circumvalațiunii is a district of Timișoara. Its name comes from Calea Circumvalațiunii, one of the city's most important roads, which crosses it and is so named because it surrounds the historic center and the former fortress. The northern section of the Timișoara Fortress was primarily occupied by military units and barracks. Prior to the construction of residential blocks, this land remained uninhabited, serving as a buffer zone between the historic fortress and the Mehala district. The area known as Circumvolutio, stretching 949 meters, formed an open expanse of land between 700 Square and Mehala.

Circumvalațiunii is one of the most expensive residential areas in Timișoara. Most of the buildings are from the 1970s when 11,400 homes were built for about 40,000 residents, making it, alongside Girocului, one of the densest neighborhood of blocks of flats in Timișoara. The location of the district was directly related to the proximity to the industrial platform developed north of the railway.
