= Torontalului =

District in northwestern Timișoara

Coordinates: 45.7748611°N 21.2118313°E

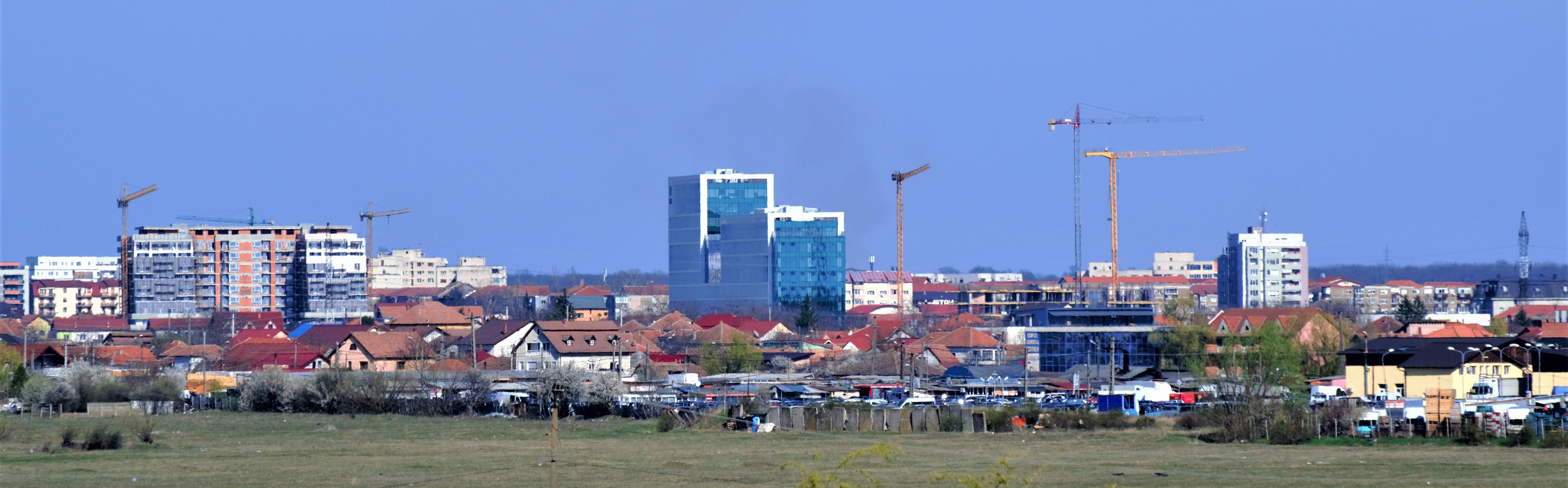
New developments in Torontalului

Torontalului is a district in northwestern Timișoara. Its name comes from the homonymous road (Calea Torontalului) that crosses it. In turn, Torontal was the name of a county in the Kingdom of Hungary which, after being conquered, liberated and disputed by Turks, Serbs, Hungarians and Romanians, was divided between the last three, a small part entering Timiș-Torontal County, an administrative unit in the Kingdom of Romania. Torontalului experienced a strong development in the 2010s, many of Timișoara's real estate projects from this period being located here.
