= Aurel =

Aurel may refer to:

== Places ==
- Aurel, Drôme, France
- Aurel, Vaucluse, France

== Other uses ==
- Aurel (given name)
- Aurel Awards, a Slovak music award
- AuRel, a dragon in E. E. Knight's Age of Fire series

== See also ==
- Aurell, people with this surname
