= Chișoda =

Chișoda may refer to one of two places in Timiș County, Romania:

- Chișoda, a village in Giroc Commune
- Chișoda Nouă, the former name of Fratelia district, Timișoara
