= Steaua, Timișoara =

District of Timișoara, Romania

Coordinates: 45°43′18″N 21°12′16″E

Steaua is a residential district located in southern Timișoara. Found along and around Steaua Street, it borders Fratelia to the northeast and lies immediately west of Calea Șagului, which links Timișoara with Șag. It stretches southward into more open, semi‑suburban zones.

The area features a mix of homes: from apartment blocks built during the communist era to more recently developed housing. The blocks in this area were constructed after 1980 and feature more spacious apartments. They were built in accordance with the stricter building standards that Romania introduced following the 1977 earthquake. The entire district project was designed by architect Gheorghe Gîrleanu.

Steaua is among the cheapest districts in Timișoara when it comes to buying a home.
