= Șagului =

District of Timișoara, Romania

Coordinates: 45.7365313°N 21.1991473°E

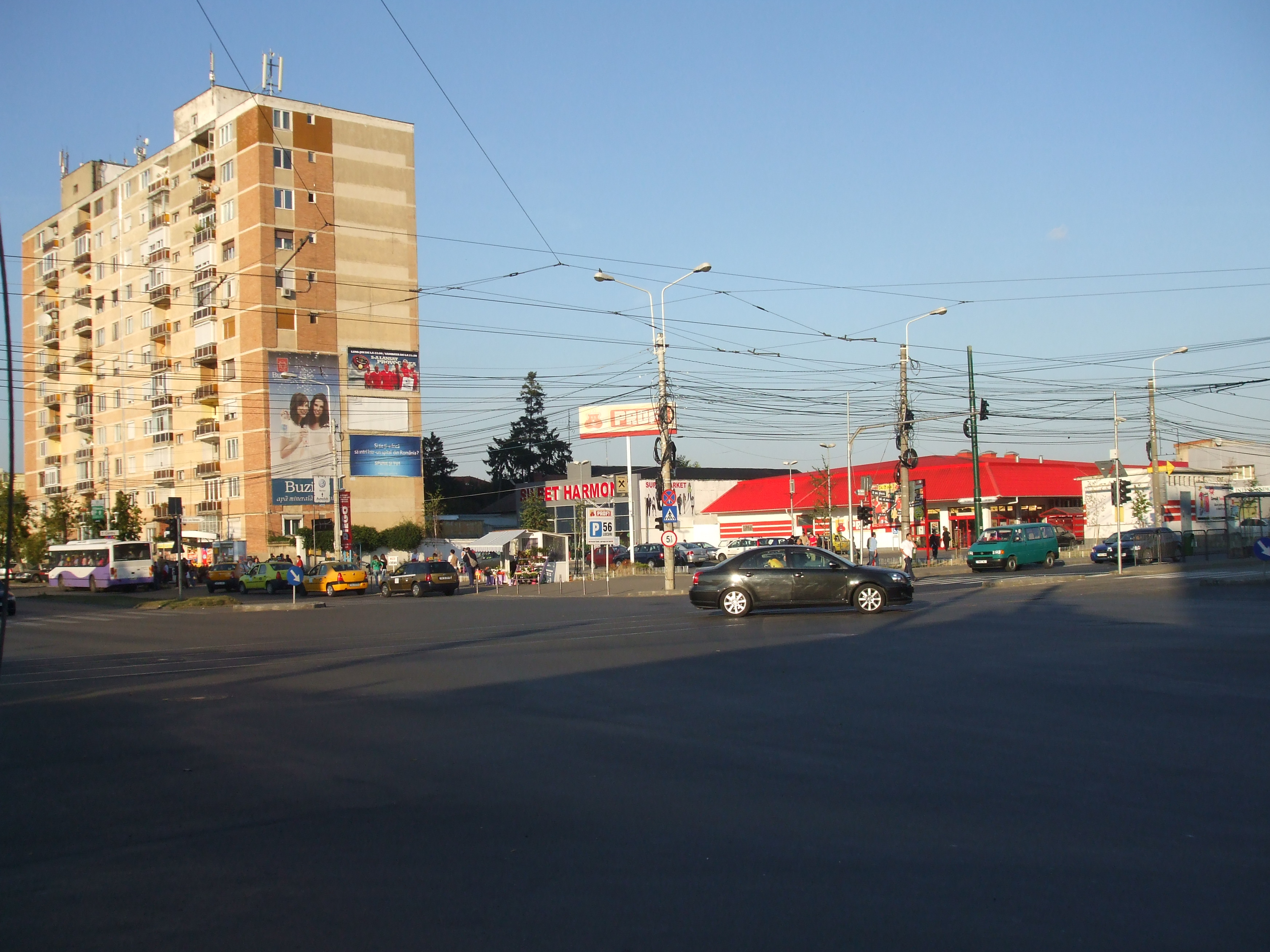
Șagului in 2009

Șagului is one of the largest and most populated districts of Timișoara. It is located in the southern part of the city, being crossed by the homonymous road (Calea Șagului) that connects the city with Șag. Șagului is considered the first neighborhood of blocks of flats in the city, created for labor migration produced when the communist regime decided to accelerate industrialization. Along the road, in the 1960s, collective houses of Soviet architecture with eight and ten floors were built, which had a propagandistic role, suggesting the greatness of communism. A total of 12,582 apartments were built for 44,000 people in Șagului and surrounding areas (Dâmbovița, Steaua, etc.).

At the exit from the city, on Calea Șagului, an industrial area with production halls was developed. There are also several shopping centers and showrooms of major car manufacturers.

== Economy ==
=== Shopping centers ===
Several shopping centers operate here: the Shopping City mall; the Aushopping Șagului shopping gallery; the hypermarkets and supermarkets Auchan, Carrefour, Kaufland, Metro, Mega Image, Lidl, Profi, reMarkt, Unicarm, and La Doi Pași; the DIY stores Dedeman, Leroy Merlin, Brico Dépôt, Arabesque, and Glissando Garden Center; the largest eMAG showroom outside Bucharest; the Dacia, Mercedes, Opel, Citroën, Ford, Škoda, Renault, Iveco, Mitsubishi, and Hyundai car showrooms; but also numerous related services: various specialized stores, retail/wholesale points of sale, the Doina public agri-food market, neighborhood centers, etc.

At the end of the week, on Saturday and Sunday, flea markets are organized in Aurora and Flavia markets.

=== Industrial area ===
At the exit from Șagului towards Șag, the largest industrial area in Timișoara was developed, with production halls, distribution centers, storage and service areas (Hirsch Porozell, Kathrein, Holcim, Lipoplast, Sage Automotive Interiors, dm-drogerie markt Romania headquarters, Sport Mechanical Workshop (Decathlon) bicycle factory, Incontro industrial platform, etc.).

== Transport ==
Șagului is crossed by European route E70 leading to Belgrade, county roads 591 (towards Cenei) and 595 (via Chișoda and Giroc), as well as by CFR lines 918 (Timișoara–Buziaș–Lugoj) and 922 (Timișoara–Stamora Moravița), which connect Timișoara with the commune of Șag and Serbia and provides the area with easy access to the city center and all the districts of Timișoara. At the same time, Timișoara Sud bypass crosses the southern edge of the district, connecting DN59 with DN6 towards Bucharest.

It is the best served area in Timișoara by means of public transport: tram lines 2, 7 and 9; buses 3, 32, 33, 33b, E1, E7 and E8, trolleybuses 11, 13, 14 and 18; metropolitan lines M11, M14, M36, M37, M46 and M51; as well as the vaporetto line on the banks of the Bega Canal.
