= Fratelia =

Fratelia Újtesöld (Hungarian) Neutischold (German) Фрателија (Serbian)
- District of Timișoara
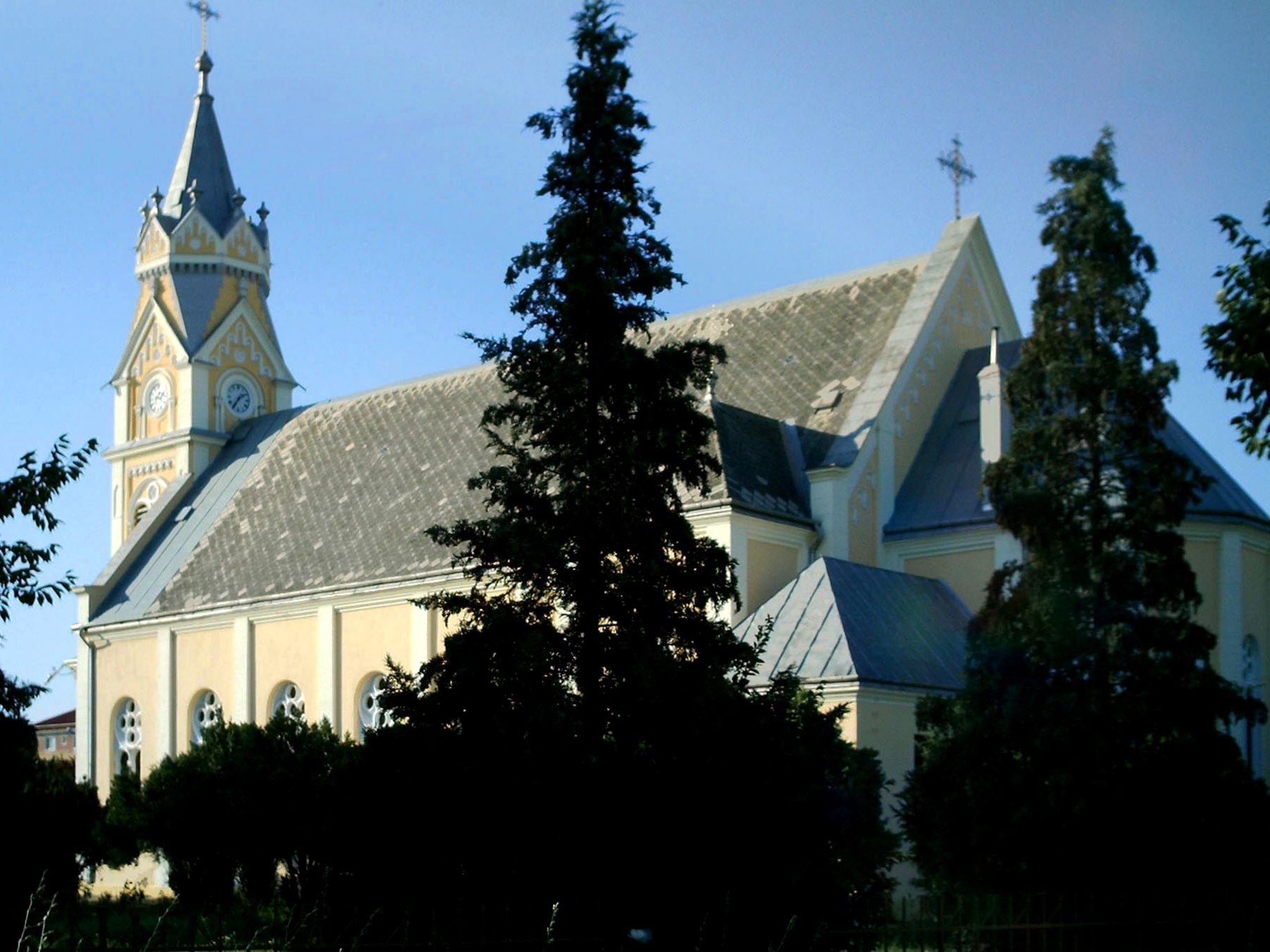
- Fratelia Roman Catholic Church
- Interactive map of Fratelia
- Coordinates: 45°43′19.64″N 21°12′55.76″E
- Country: Romania
- County: Timiș
- City: Timișoara

Area
  - Total: 2.31 km^{2} (0.89 sq mi)

Fratelia (Hungarian: Újkissoda, also Újtesöld; German: Neukischoda, also Neutischold; Serbian: Фрателија, romanized: Fratelija), known until 1925 as Chișoda Nouă, is a district in southern Timișoara. Fratelia was in the past divided into two areas: Fratelia A, located towards Calea Șagului and Fratelia B, located towards Calea Martirilor.

== Geography ==
Fratelia is divided from Elisabetin by Gavril Musicescu Street, an L-shaped thoroughfare and one of the longest streets in Timișoara. Gavril Musicescu Street starts near Doina Market, runs a few hundred meters southward parallel to Calea Șagului, then takes a 90-degree turn eastward, stretching past Calea Girocului (Martirilor) before eventually fading out after several kilometers in the new Urseni residential area.

Fratelia was split into two sections: Fratelia A, which lies closer to Calea Șagului, and Fratelia B, situated near Calea Girocului (Martirilor). These two parts are divided by Cercului Street, commonly known as ștrec, a name that refers to the former railway that once ran there. Southwest of Fratelia is Steaua, to the west is Șagului, and to the northeast lies Braytim. Directly south, beyond a vacant lot, is Chișoda.

== History ==
On the current location of Fratelia were discovered houses and ceramics characteristic of the early Neolithic (Vinča culture). A Bronze Age cremation necropolis with about 200 graves has also been unearthed nearby. Some of the funerary urns are on display today in the Museum of Banat.

In the early 1900s, the land on which Fratelia stands today was empty; much of it belonged to Kende family. The Kendes owned a brickyard. They parceled out the land and gave their workers the opportunity to buy affordable land to build their houses. Soon, a series of houses with gardens of flowers, fruits and vegetables appeared. The first street called Alleegasse (present-day Bujorilor Street) appeared also at that time. At first the settlement was called Kendetelep (in Hungarian, telep means "settlement"), which in 1910 was part of Chișoda. In addition to brickyard workers, people from neighboring villages who worked in Timișoara built houses here. Later, the Kendes donated land for the construction of a town hall, a school, a church and a cemetery. In 1919, the new settlement was named Chișoda Nouă and became a commune with its own administration. In 1930 it had 7,688 inhabitants, of which 3,388 Hungarians, 3,160 Germans and 867 Romanians. The first attempts to annex the village to Timișoara were between the two world wars, when the tram line was built. On 1 December 1928, Timișoara decided to take over the "sanitary and police measures, as well as the sewerage and lighting" of the suburban communes that were within a 5 km radius of it, including Fratelia. At the same time, the inhabitants requested to join Timișoara. Fratelia became the 6th constituency of Timișoara only in 1948. The brick factory, once owned by the Kendes, disappeared in the 1980s when the current thermal power plant was built.

== Churches ==
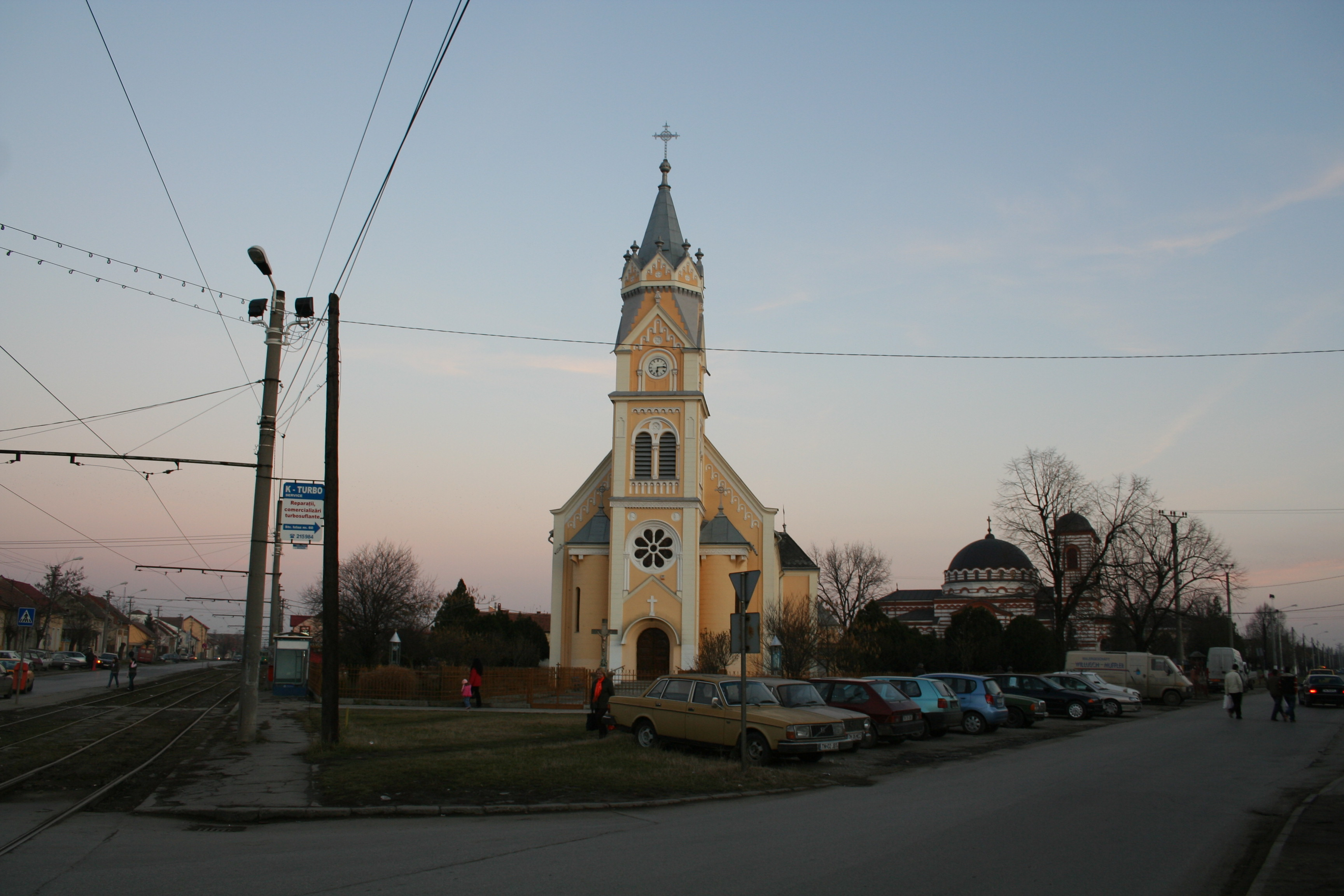
St. Joseph Roman Catholic Church (front) and Sts. Apostles Peter and Paul Orthodox Church (back)

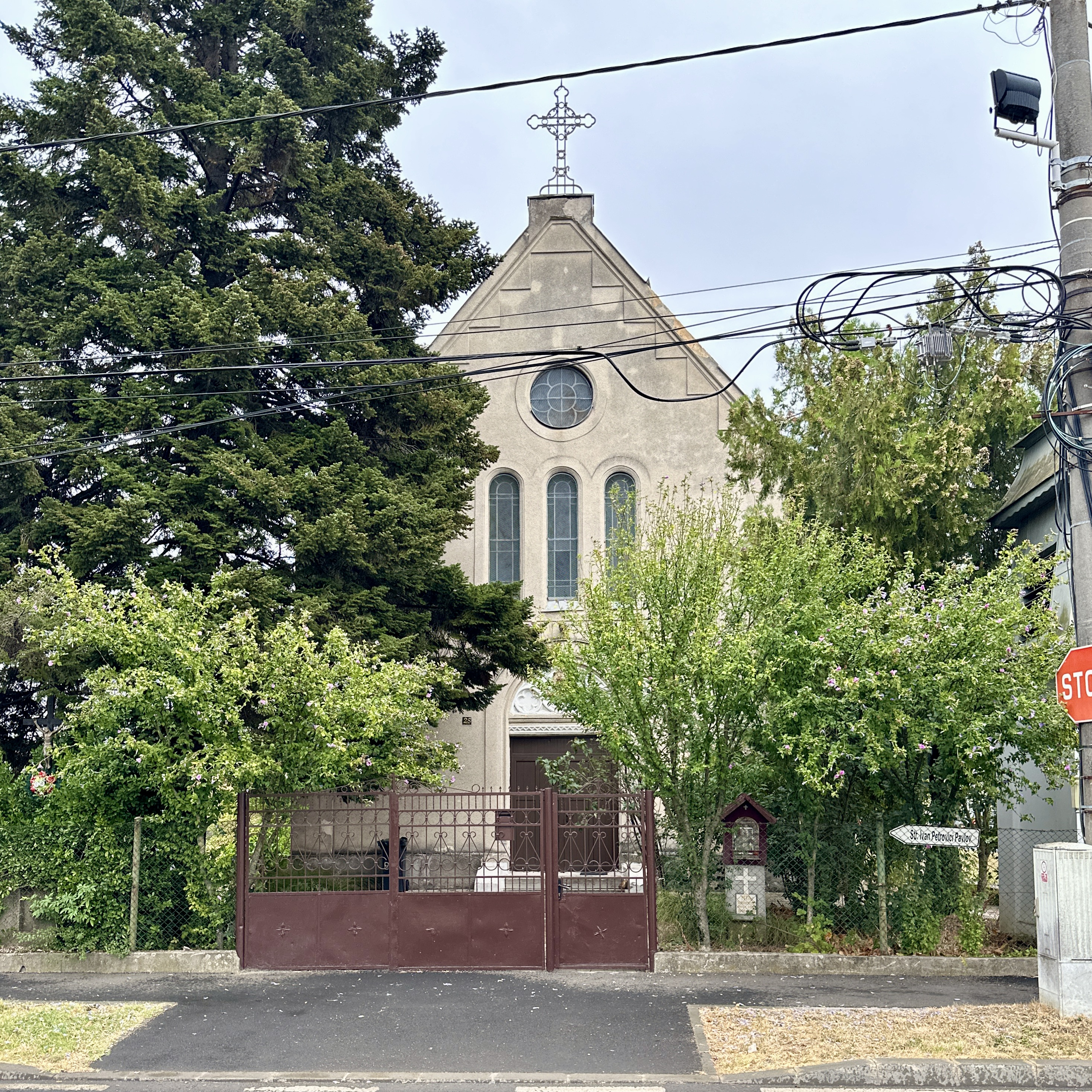
Church of the Dormition of Virgin Mary (Roman Catholic)
