= Camil Petrescu =

Romanian playwright, novelist, philosopher and poet (1894 - 1954)

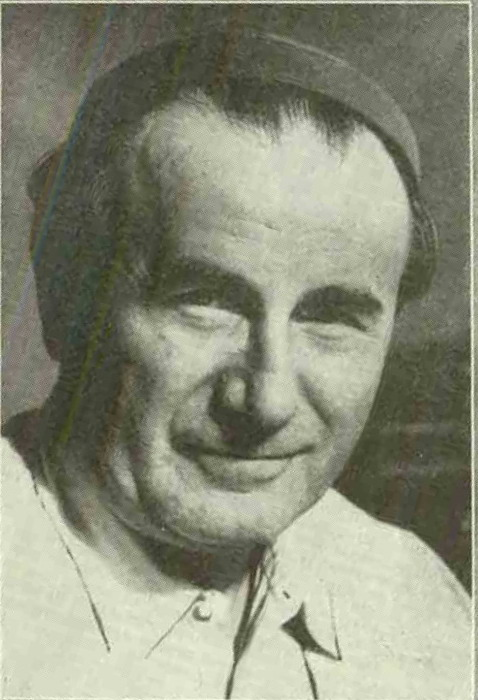
- Born: 21 April 1894; Bucharest, Kingdom of Romania
- Died: 14 May 1957 (aged 63); Bucharest, Romanian People's Republic
- Resting place: Bellu Cemetery, Bucharest, Romania
- Education: University of Bucharest
- Occupations: playwright; novelist; philosopher; poet; theatre critic
- Writing career
- Pen name: Raul D.
- Language: Romanian
- Years active: 1914-1957
- Notable works: "Last night of love, first night of war" (novel published in 1930)
- Literary movement: Realism; Modernism

Camil Petrescu (Romanian pronunciation: [kaˈmil peˈtresku]; 9/21 April 1894 – 14 May 1957) was a Romanian playwright, novelist, philosopher and poet. He marked the end of the traditional novel era and laid the foundation of the modern novel era in Romania. He was a member of the Sburătorul and a mentor to the writer Anișoara Odeanu.

== Life ==
Petrescu was born in Bucharest in 1894. He lost both his parents early in life and was raised by a relative, or a nanny from the Moșilor suburb (the sources remain quite unclear on this).

Petrescu went to primary school at Obor, and to high school at Saint Sava National College, where he wrote his very first poem. Being very poor, he studied assiduously, worked to support himself, and relatively late—at the age of 29—he began his studies in philosophy at the University of Bucharest. His antisemitism is controversial, having Jewish friends such as Mihail Sebastian.

In 1916, Petrescu was drafted and sent to the battlefields of then raging World War I, where he was wounded and taken prisoner by the Austro-Hungarians in 1917. Freed in 1918, he depicted his war experiences in his 1930 novel Ultima noapte de dragoste, întâia noapte de război ("Last Night of Love, First Night of War"). In 1933, Petrescu wrote the novel Patul lui Procust ("The Bed of Procrustes"; see Procrustes' bed). He was a teacher in Timișoara, and director of the National Theatre Bucharest. He was elected titular member of the Romanian Academy in 1948. He died in 1957 in Bucharest, and was buried at the city's Bellu Cemetery.

== Works ==
- Ultima noapte de dragoste, întâia noapte de război ("Last Night of Love, First Night of War"), 1930
- Patul lui Procust ("The Bed of Procrustes"), 1933, of which we now have Ileana Orlich's translation of 2008, published by the Camil Petrescu Cultural Foundation in Bucharest)
- Doctrina substanței ("The Doctrine of Substance"), 1940

== Filmography ==
- Patul lui Procust (2001) – Bed of Procust, or Procust's Bed (International English title; the original Romanian title refers to the mythical Procrustes)
- Cei care plătesc cu viața (1991) a.k.a. Those Who Pay With Their Lives (1991)
- Mitică Popescu (1984) (play)
- Iată femeia pe care o iubesc (1981) (TV) (play)
- Ultima noapte de dragoste (1979) (novel Ultima noapte de dragoste, întîia noapte de război) - Last Night of Love, First Night Of War (1979)
