= Anișoara Odeanu =

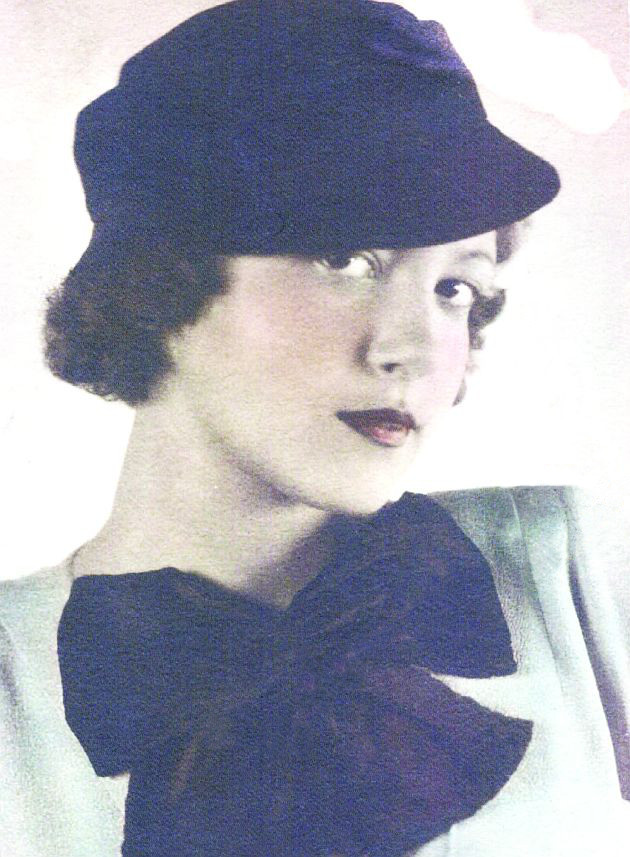
- Anișoara Odeanu, 1933
- Born: Doina Stella Grațiana Peteanu; May 28, 1912; Pădureni, Timiș, Kingdom of Romania
- Died: September 1, 1972 (aged 60); Lugoj, Socialist Republic of Romania
- Education: University of Bucharest
- Spouse: Dan Crivetz

Anișoara Odeanu (28 May 1912 – 1 September 1972), also known as Doina Stella Grațiana Peteanu, was a Romanian journalist, poet, and prose writer during the interwar period.

== Early days ==
She was born in Pădureni, Timiș County, the daughter of a well known folklorist. Her friend and mentor was the celebrated Romanian author Camil Petrescu.

== Career ==
Odeanu began writing as a child; her first poem was published at the age of 9 in her hometown. From 1929 to 1933, she studied at the Faculty of Letters in Bucharest. After graduation, she began studying law at the University of Bucharest and graduated in 1936.

Her debut novel was published in 1934 and was favourably reviewed by Romanian critics; George Călinescu referred to her as the first ingenue of female Romanian literature.

During the war, she wrote for the Romanian propaganda division.

== Later years ==
Eventually her writing fell out of fashion; her work was rehabilitated in 1965 and her first novel, Într-un cămin de domnișoare, was republished. In 1972, she committed suicide the day after the death of her husband, Dan Crivetz.

== Legacy ==
The Anișoara Odeanu Memorial House was inaugurated on 25 August 2020 in Pădureni. A gymnasium school in Lugoj is named after her. Streets in Lugoj and Timișoara also bear her name.

== Selected works ==
- Într-un Cămin de Domnișoare (In a Young Ladies' Boardinghouse, 1934)
- Călător din Noaptea de Ajun (Traveller on Christmas Eve, 1937)
