= Fratelia Roman Catholic Church =

Catholic church in Fratella, Romania

St. Joseph Church
- Biserica „Sf. Iosif”
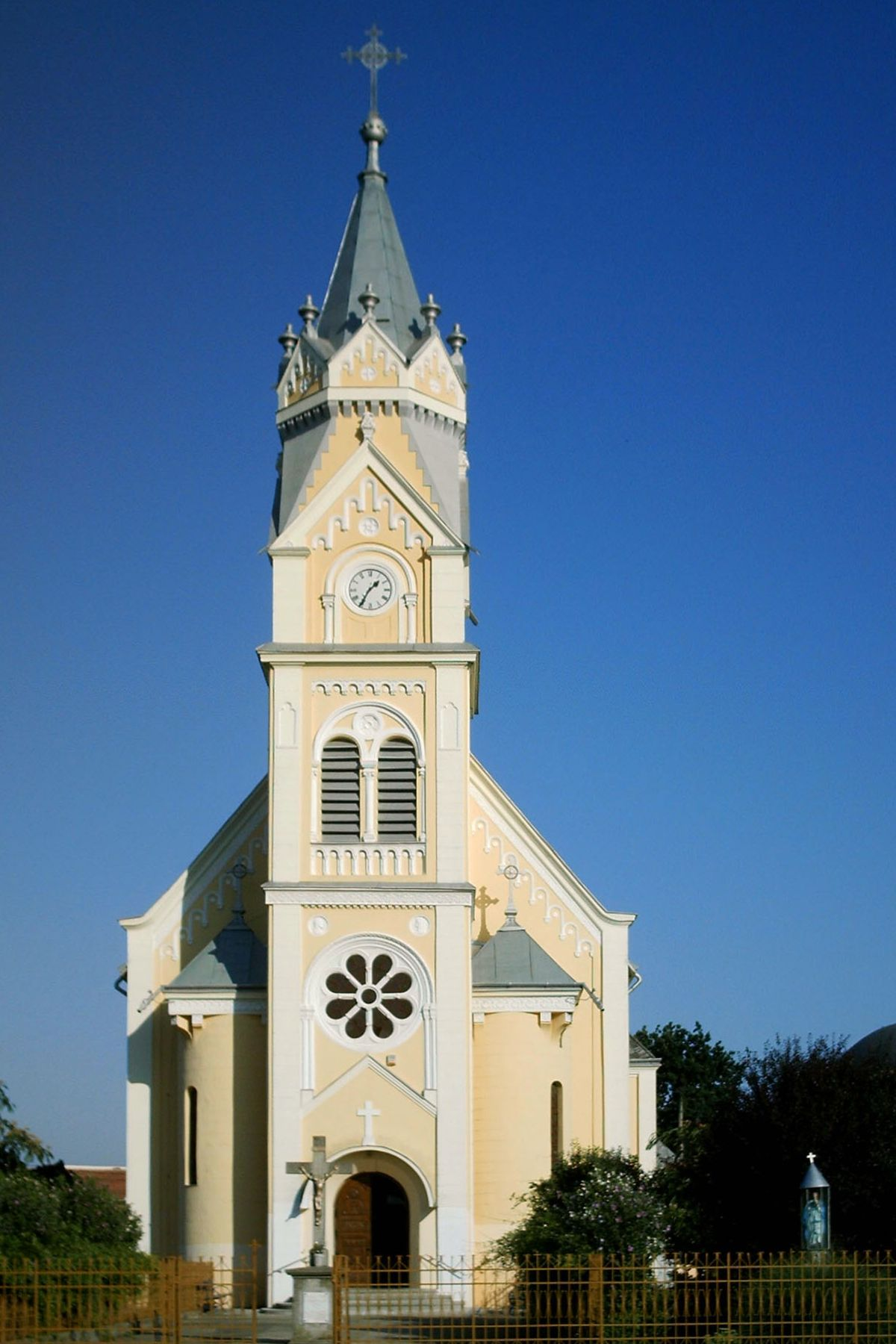

Religion
- Affiliation: Roman Catholic
- Patron: Saint Joseph
- Year consecrated: 1930
- Status: Active

Location
- Location: 7 Victor Hugo Street, Timișoara
- Interactive map of St. Joseph Church
- Coordinates: 45°43′33″N 21°12′33″E

Architecture
- Architect: Elemér Makai
- Style: Neo-Gothic
- Founder: Angelicus Bugiel
- Groundbreaking: 1926
- Completed: 1928

Specifications
- Length: 43 m
- Width: 13 m
- Height (max): 34 m

The St. Joseph Church is a Roman Catholic church in the Fratelia district of Timișoara in western Romania. In the church the liturgies are celebrated in Hungarian, German and Romanian.

== History ==
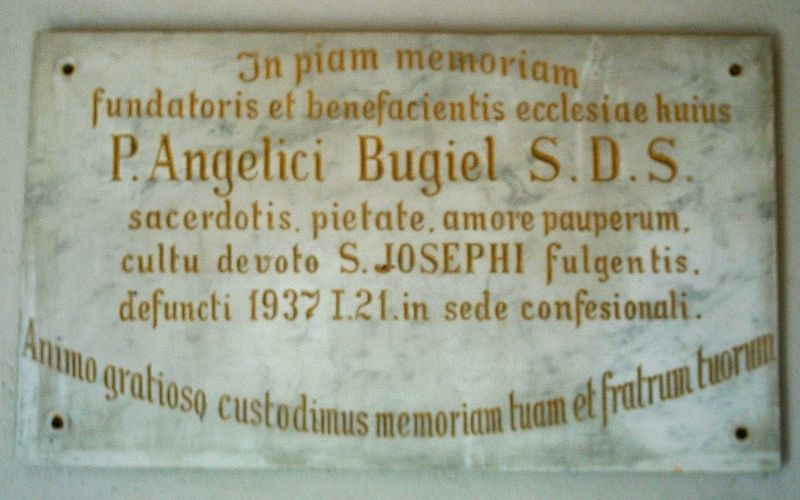
Memorial plaque commemorating the founder of the church, Pater Angelicus Bugiel

The Roman Catholic parish of Fratelia was founded in 1932. The church was built between 1926 and 1928, during the time of the Salvatorian priest Angelicus Bugiel. The foundation stone of the Roman Catholic Church was laid in the presence of the then Vicar General István Fiedler, who later became the Roman Catholic Bishop of Oradea and Satu Mare. The consecration of the church was made on 6 July 1930 by Bishop Augustin Pacha.

In 1944, during World War II, the building sustained significant damage. The Red Army installed a telephone exchange inside the church and set up a military observation point in its tower. As a result of artillery fire, the roof was damaged.

== Architecture ==
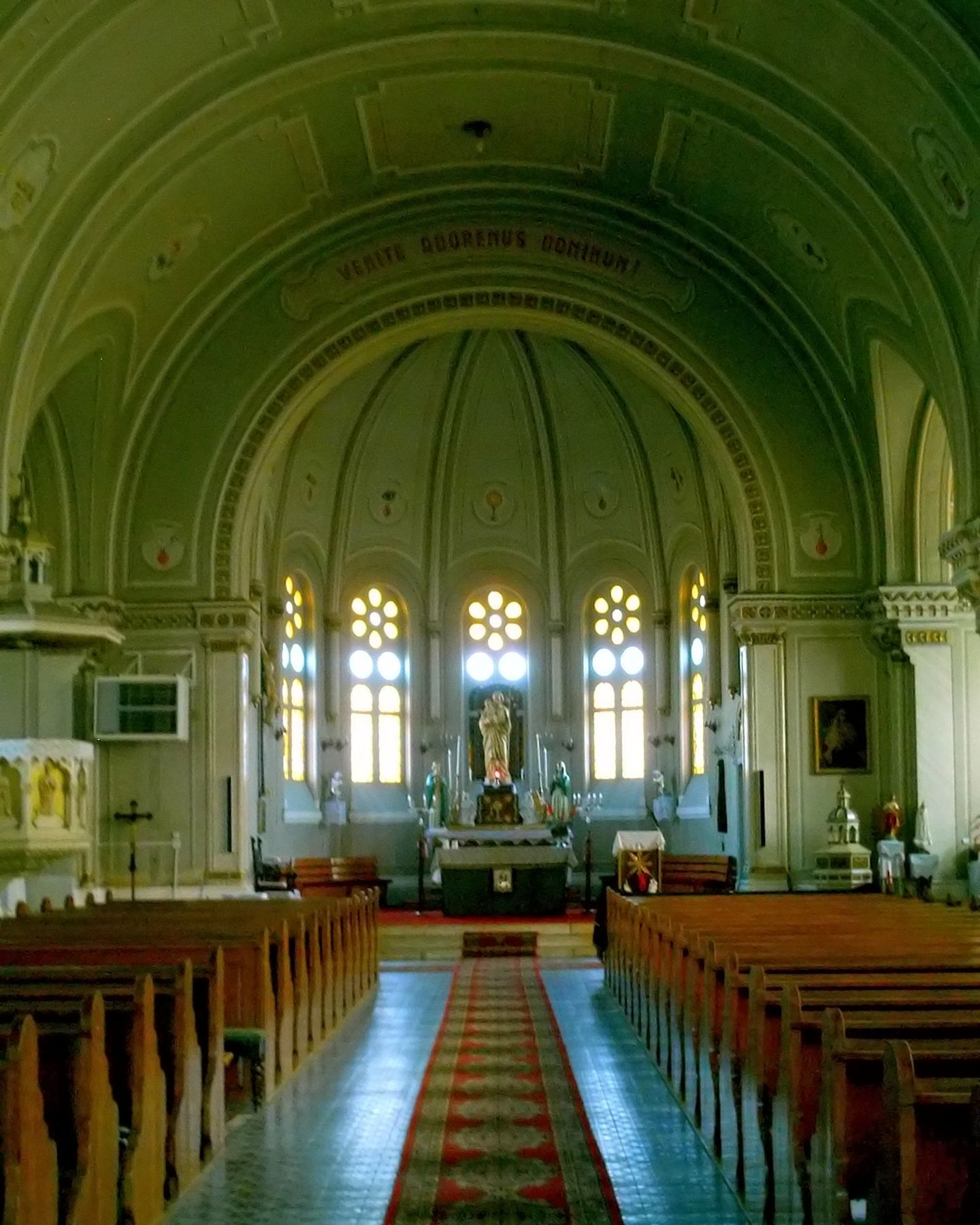
Church interior

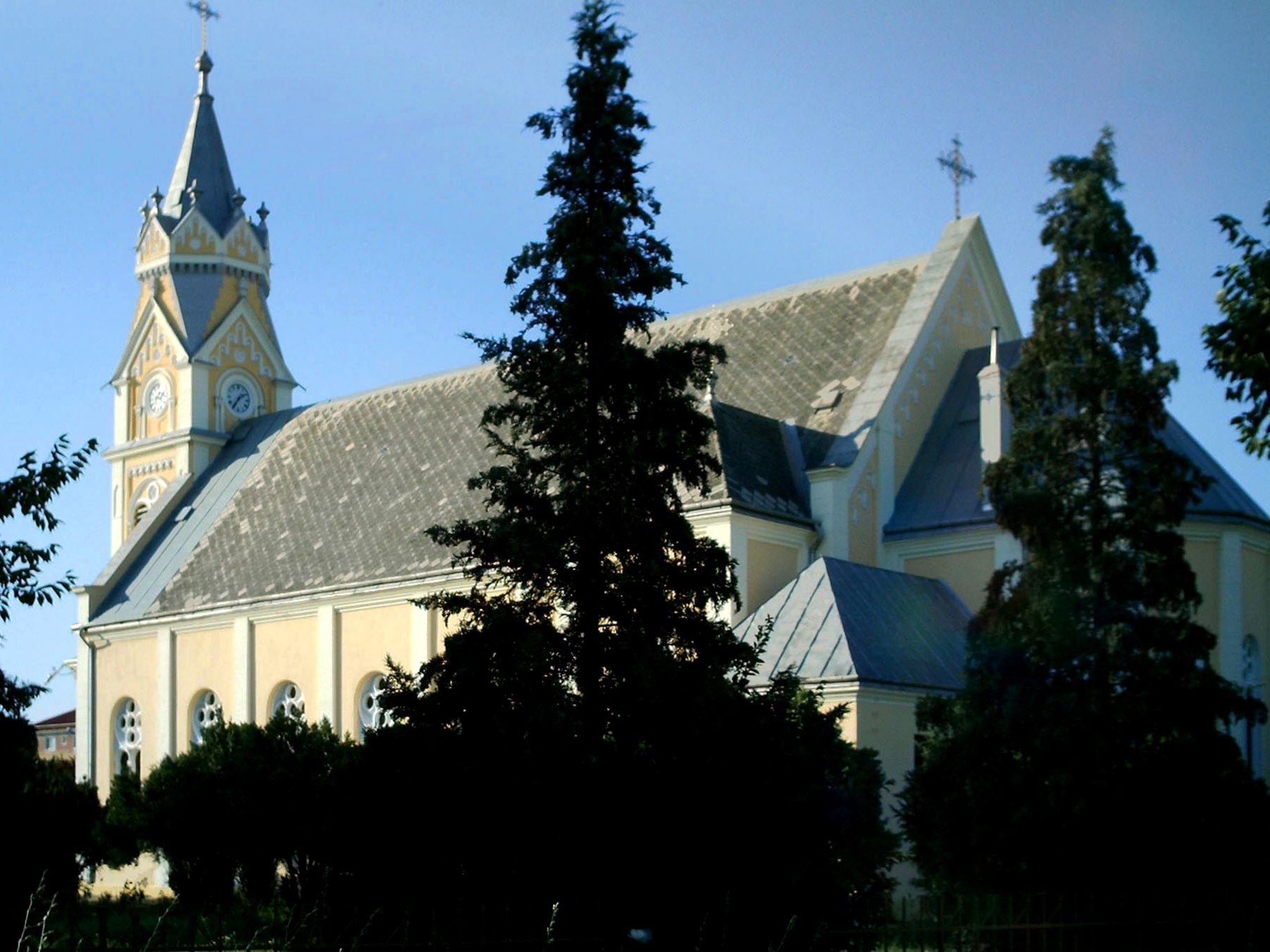
A view of the church from the side and back

The church, located at the intersection of Ana Ipătescu, Victor Hugo and Chișodei streets, is also known as Fratelia A, because there is also a small Roman Catholic church called Fratelia B on Ivan Pavlov Street. It is built in neo-Gothic style according to the plans of the architect Elemér Makai. The church has a length of 43 m and a width of 13 m. The height of the tower is 34 m. The bells were cast in 1930 by the Novotny company from Timișoara. The main altar is adorned with a wooden statue of Saint Joseph, the patron saint of the church. The windows are arched in Romanesque style, made of white and yellow glass, the colors of the Holy See.

In the 1970s the church was renovated, both inside and outside, the paintings being the work of the Timișoara master, originally from Fratelia, Jakob Hahn Sr. In 1977 the church received an electric clock from Vienna, a donation from Caritas Freiburg. In 1978 the interior of the church was transformed according to the provisions of the Second Vatican Council.

== Fratelia B ==
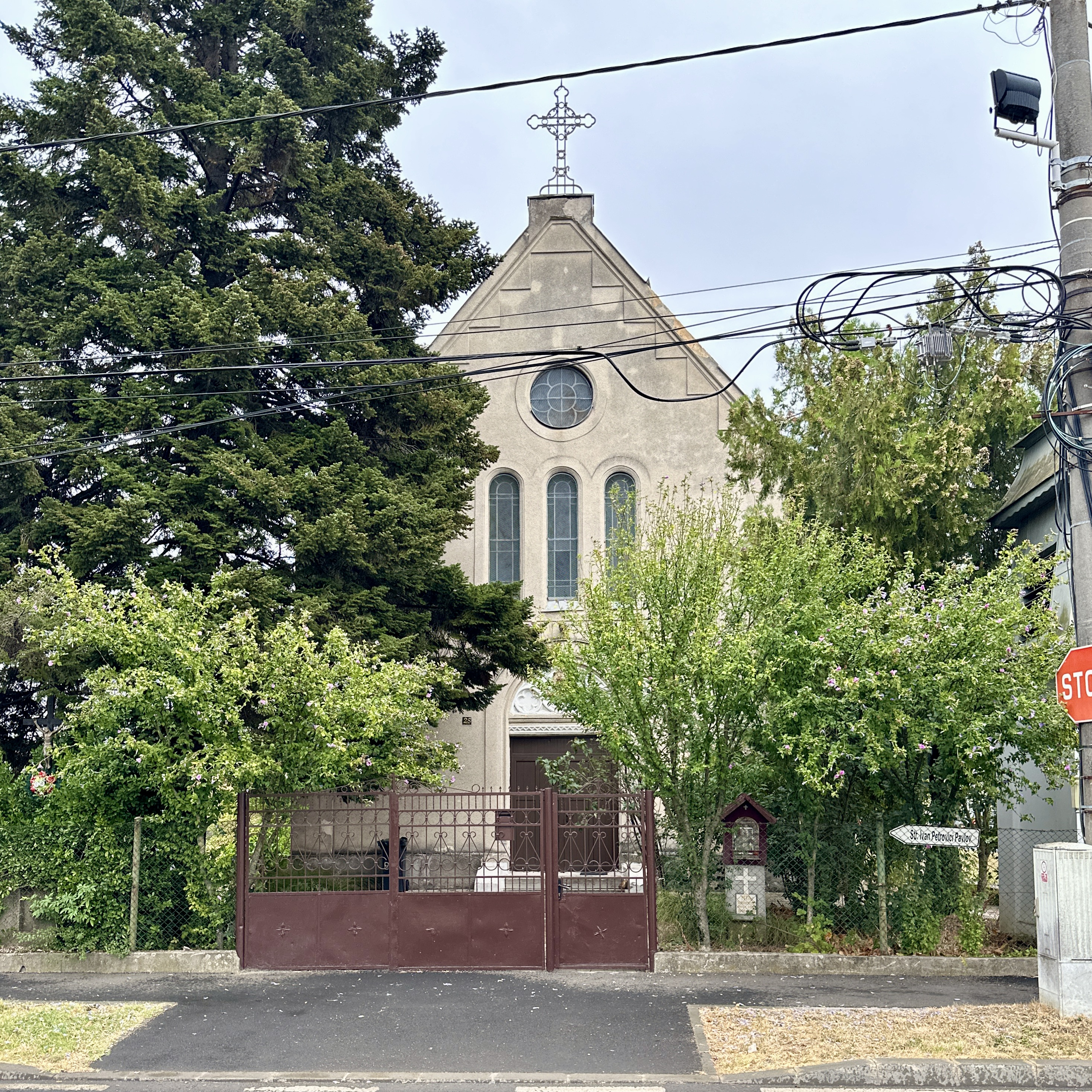
Church of the Dormition of Virgin Mary

The small towerless church dedicated to the Dormition of the Virgin Mary was built in 1928 at the initiative of Salvatorian priest Columban Heinrich Cieslik, in the workers' colony of Bessenyei (Fratelia B). The foundation stone was laid on 8 June 1927, during a solemn ceremony, and the church was consecrated on 19 August 1928, by Catholic Bishop Augustin Pacha.

Part of the main altar originates from the former chapel of the Roman Catholic Seminary in Timișoara, which was closed by the communist authorities in 1948. The church currently belongs to the Saint Joseph Parish in Fratelia, and services are held in Hungarian, German, and Romanian.
