= Aurel (given name) =

Aurel is a Romanian-language masculine given name derived from Latin "Aurelius". The country with the largest proportion of people named Aurel is Albania with 0.1209% of the population. Following is Romania and France.

People with the name include:

- Aurel Aldea (1887–1949), Romanian general, Interior Minister, and anti-communist resistance leader
- Aurel Babeș (1886–1962), Romanian pathologist
- Aurel Băeșu (1896–1928), Romanian painter
- Aurel Benović (born 2000), Croatian artistic gymnast
- Aurél Bernáth (1895–1982), Hungarian painter and art theorist
- Aurel Bratu (born 1973), Romanian fencer
- Aurel Braun (born 1947), Canadian political scientist
- Aurel Bulgariu (1934–1995), Romanian handball player
- Aurel Bylykbashi, Albanian politician
- Aurel Ciupe (1900–1985), Romanian painter
- Aurel S. Croissant (born 1969), German political scientist
- Aurél Csertői (born 1965), Hungarian football player and manager
- Aurel Dermek (1925–1989), Slovak mycologist
- Aurél Dessewffy (1808–1842), Hungarian journalist and politician
- Aurél Dessewffy (1846–1928), Hungarian politician
- Aurel Guga (1898–1936), Romanian football player
- Aurel Iancu (born 1928), Romanian economist
- Aurel Jivi (1943–2002), Romanian Orthodox priest
- Aurél von Kelemen (1888–1968), Hungarian tennis player
- Aurel Kolnai (1900–1973), Hungarian philosopher
- Aurel Krause (1848–1908), German geographer
- Aurel Léger (1894–1961), Canadian politician
- Aurel Loșniță (born 1927), Romanian gymnast
- Aurel Macarencu (born 1963), Romanian sprint canoer
- Aurel Onciul (1864–1921), ethnic Romanian politician in Bukovina
- Aurel Pantea (born 1952), Romanian poet and literary critic
- Aurel Percă (born 1951), Romanian Catholic bishop
- Aurel Persu (1890–1977), Romanian engineer
- Aurel Popovici (1863–1917), ethnic Romanian Austro-Hungarian lawyer and politician
- Aurel Rău (born 1930), Romanian writer
- Aurel Saulea, Moldovan politician
- Aurel Stein (1862–1943), Hungarian-born British archaeologist
- Aurel Stodola (1859–1942), Slovak engineer, physicist, and inventor
- Aurél Stromfeld (1878–1927), Hungarian general
- Aurel Suciu (1853–1898), ethnic Romanian Austro-Hungarian lawyer and political activist
- Aurel Șelaru (1935–2020), Romanian cyclist
- Aurel Ștefan (born 1950), Romanian fencer
- Aurel Șunda (born 1957), Romanian football player and manager
- Aurel Toma (1911–1980), Romanian professional boxer
- Aurel Țicleanu (born 1959), Romanian football player and manager
- Aurel Vaszin (1885–1979), Romanian-American roller coaster designer
- Aurel Vernescu (1939–2008), Romanian sprint canoeist
- Aurel Vlaicu (1882–1913), Romanian aviation pioneer
- Aurel Wintner (1903–1958), Hungarian-American mathematician
