= Pădureni, Timiș =

Pădureni
- Commune
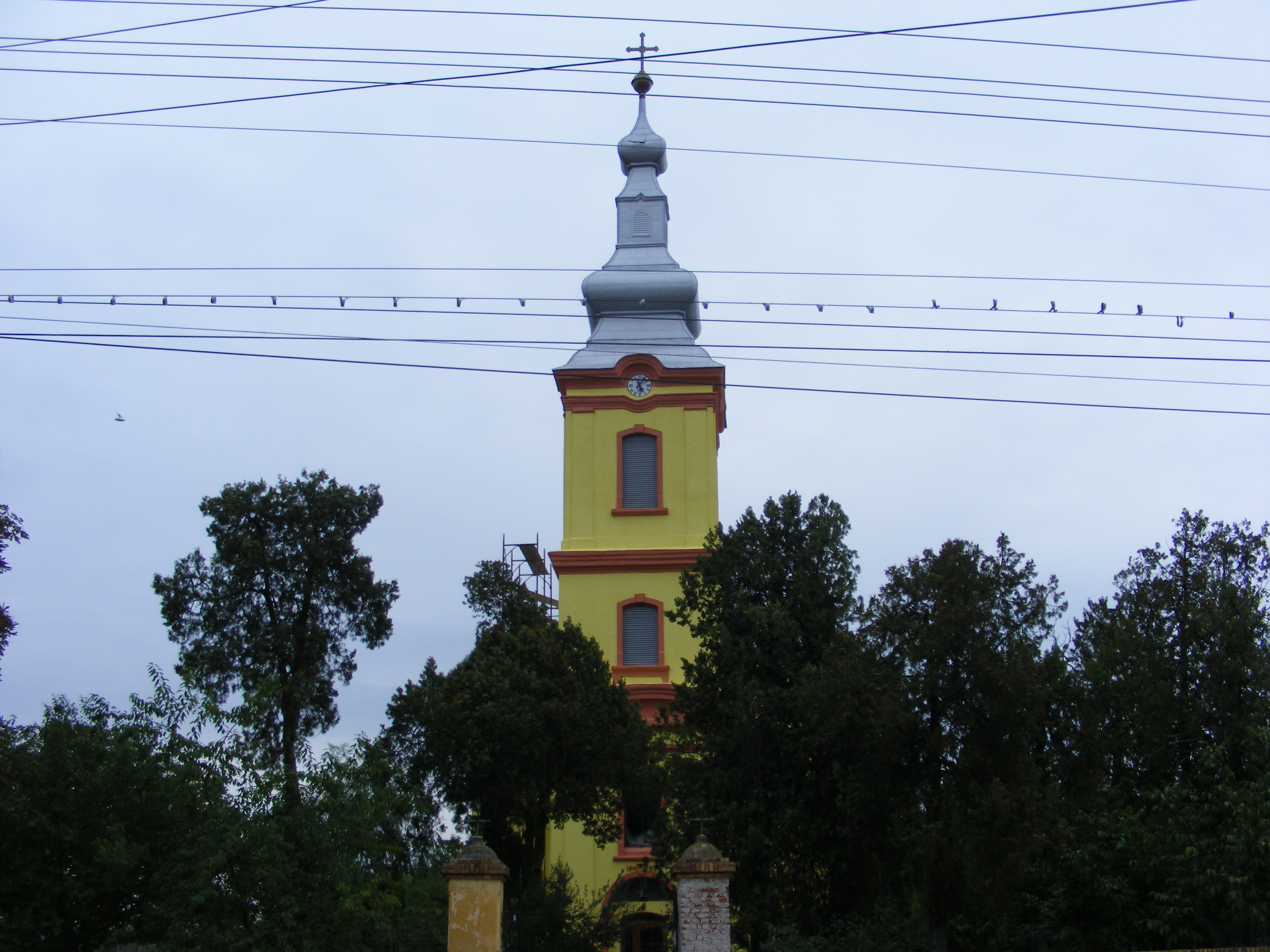
- The Orthodox church in Pădureni

- Location in Timiș County

- Location in Romania
- Coordinates: 45°36′N 21°13′E
- Country: Romania
- County: Timiș

Government
  - Mayor (2008–): Dorin Ignuța (PNL)
- Area: 53.3 km^{2} (20.6 sq mi)
- Elevation: 85 m (279 ft)
- Population (2021-12-01): 2,052
  - Density: 38.5/km^{2} (99.7/sq mi)
- Time zone: UTC+02:00 (EET)
  - Summer (DST): UTC+03:00 (EEST)
- Postal code: 307236
- Area code: +(40) 256
- Vehicle reg.: TM
- Website: primaria-padureni.ro

Pădureni (until 1965 Lighed; Hungarian: Temesliget; German: Legendl; Serbian: Лигед, romanized: Liged; Turkish: Erdevik) is a commune in Timiș County, Romania. It is composed of a single village, Pădureni. It was part of Jebel commune before being split off in 2004.

== Geography ==
Pădureni is located about 18 km (11 mi) south of Timișoara, at the angle formed by the "dead" Timiș and the "flowing" Timiș. It borders Șag to the north, Liebling to the east, Jebel to the south, and Parța to the northwest.

== History ==
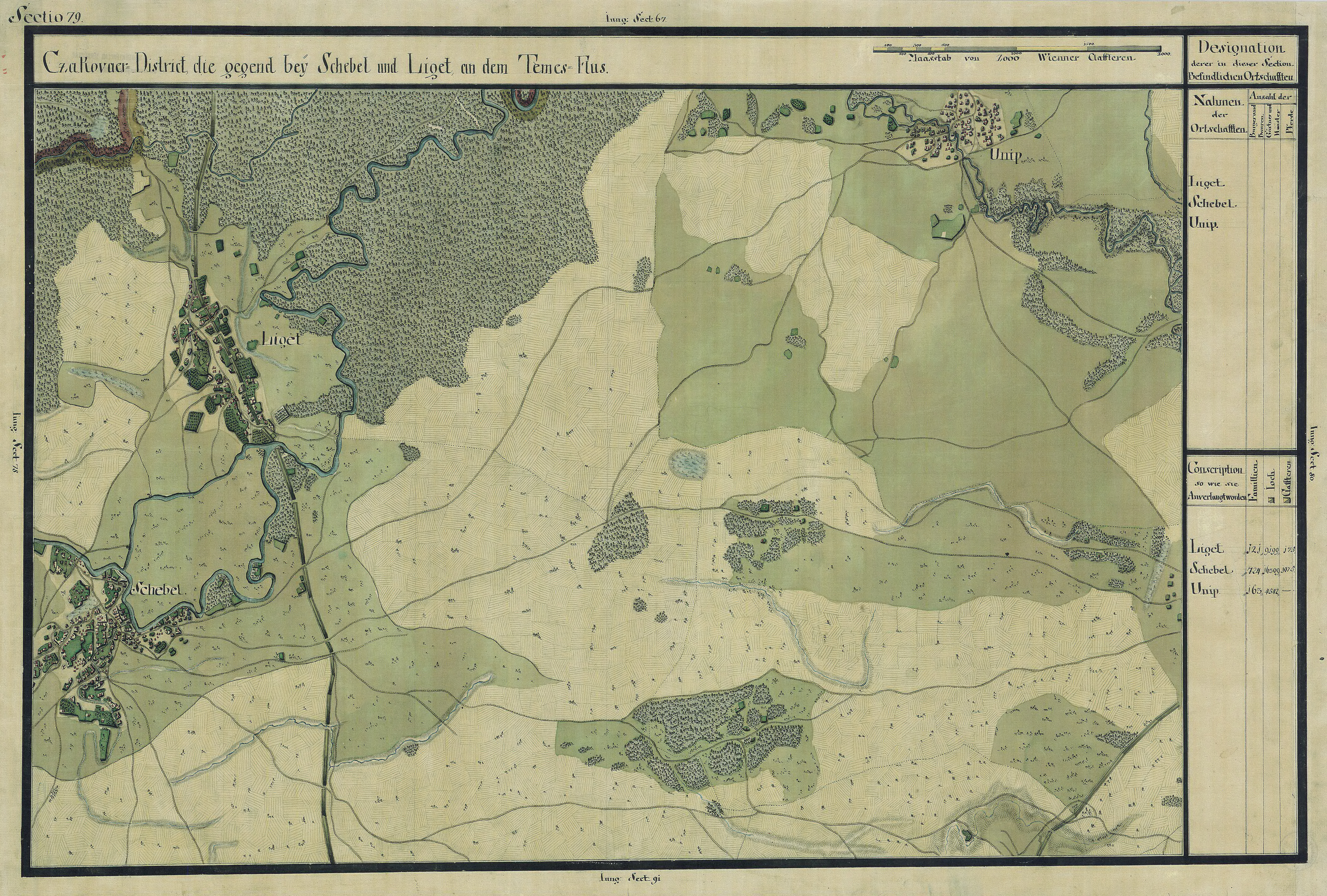
Pădureni (Liget) in the Josephinische Landesaufnahme of 1769–1772

The first recorded mention of Pădureni dates from 1332, under the name of Legvid. At the same time, there is a village called Mira (1310), now disappeared, which legend has it was destroyed in a Turkish raid. In an Ottoman defter, around 1590, the name of Ligit is also mentioned. After this moment no other data are known until 1761, when it appears again mentioned with the name Lighed or Temeslighed and a number of 312 houses.

University professor Remus Crețan claims that today's locality was formed towards the end of the Turkish era, "on account of the Romanian and Turkish elements from Timiș meadow". According to historian Nicolae Ilieșiu, after the conquest of Banat by the Austrians, the locality was systematized by Count Mercy, from where until then the village was a "clog" on Trajan's Wall in the area called Iarc. It has been mostly Romanian ever since; the Romanian majority was preserved even during the periods of intense colonization of Banat.

== Demographics ==
Ethnic composition (2021)
1. Romanians (87.0%)
2. Roma (3.89%)
3. Unknown (7.84%)
4. Others (1.24%)
Religious composition (2021)
1. Orthodox (83.5%)
2. Pentecostals (3.75%)
3. Roman Catholics (1.55%)
4. Unknown (8.23%)
5. Others (2.57%)
6. Irreligious, atheists and agnostics (0.43%)

Pădureni had a population of 2,052 inhabitants at the 2021 census, up 5.89% from the 2011 census. Most inhabitants are Romanians (87.03%), with a minority of Roma (3.89%). For 7.84% of the population, ethnicity is unknown. By religion, most inhabitants are Orthodox (83.47%), but there are also minorities of Pentecostals (3.75%) and Roman Catholics (1.55%). For 8.23% of the population, religious affiliation is unknown.

Census		Ethnic composition
Year	Population	Romanians	Hungarians	Germans	Roma
1880	1,568	1,441	20	49	–
1890	1,668	1,538	32	66	–
1900	1,873	1,696	70	86	–
1910	1,822	1,611	62	66	73
1920	1,782	1,641	60	70	–
1930	1,698	1,574	29	13	70
1941	1,976	1,773	50	28	–
1956	1,641 (Note: Including data on Pădurenii Mici's population)	–	–	–	–
1966	2,235	2,070	46	16	96
1977	2,185	2,086	23	5	67
1992	1,566	1,479	15	8	60
2002	1,623	1,439	11	4	164
2011	1,938	1,804	17	–	22
2021	2,052	1,786	14	3	80

== Politics and administration ==
The commune of Pădureni is administered by a mayor and a local council composed of 11 councilors. The mayor, Dorin Ignuța, from the National Liberal Party, has been in office since 2008. As from the 2024 local elections, the local council has the following composition by political parties:

Party	Seats	Composition
National Liberal Party	7	
Social Democratic Party	4	

== Notable people ==
- Anișoara Odeanu (1912–1972), journalist, poet, and prose writer; the Anișoara Odeanu Memorial House was built in Pădureni in 2020.
