= Giroc =

- Commune
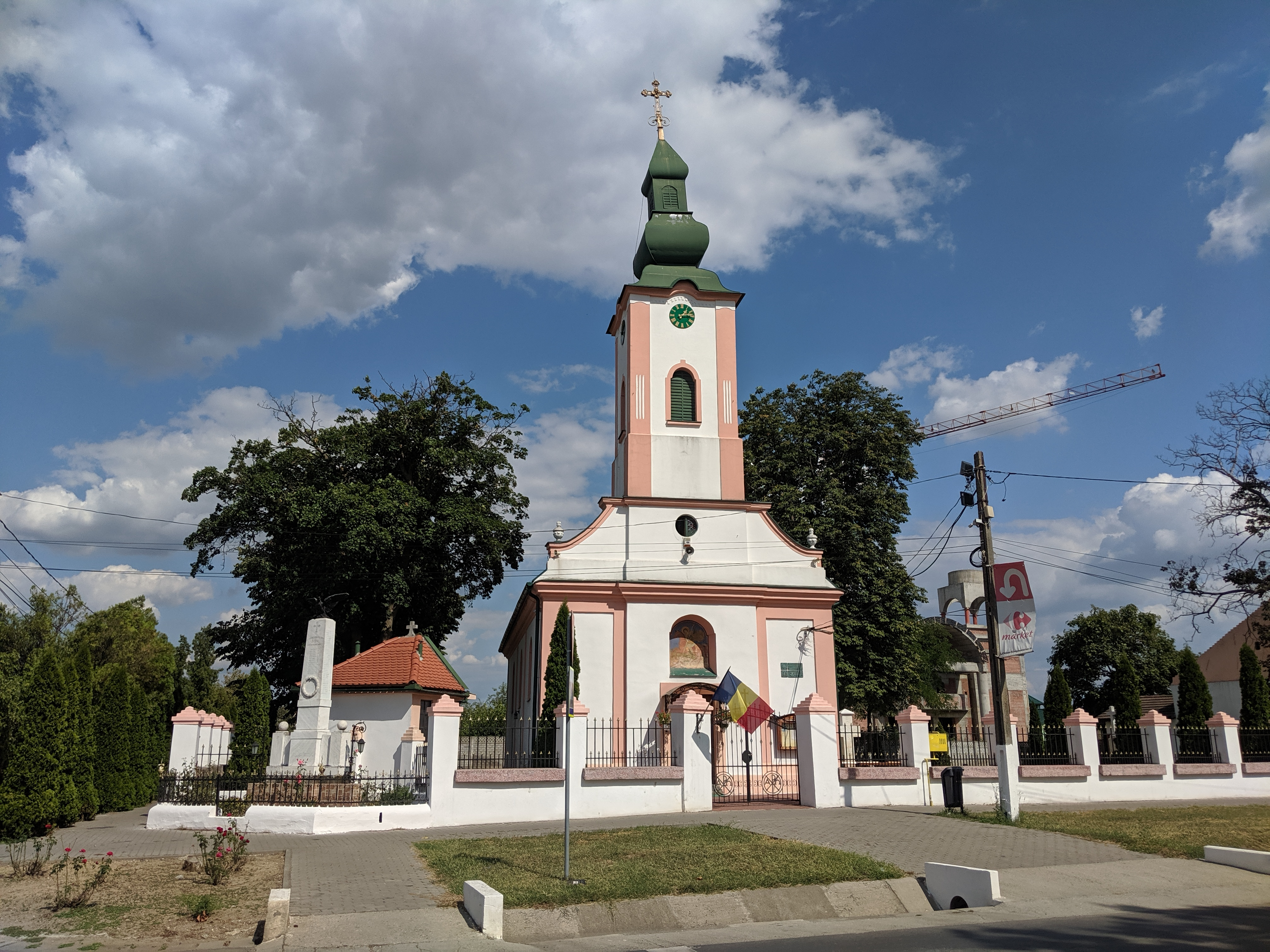
- St. Demetrius Orthodox church in Giroc

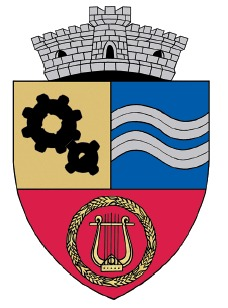
- Coat of arms

- Location in Timiș County

- Location in Romania
- Coordinates: 45°42′N 21°14′E
- Country: Romania
- County: Timiș

Government
  - Mayor (2024–): Dan Vîrtosu (PNL)
- Area: 52.77 km^{2} (20.37 sq mi)
- Population (2021-12-01): 22,270
  - Density: 422.0/km^{2} (1,093/sq mi)
- Time zone: UTC+02:00 (EET)
  - Summer (DST): UTC+03:00 (EEST)
- Postal code: 307220–307221
- Vehicle reg.: TM
- Website: www.giroc.ro

Giroc (Hungarian: Gyüreg; German: Girok; Serbian: Гирок, romanized: Girok) is a commune in Timiș County, Romania. It is composed of two villages, Chișoda and Giroc (commune seat). It is located near Timișoara, south of the city.

== Location ==
Giroc is a suburban commune of Timișoara, located three kilometers south of it. In recent years, by building and developing the neighborhood in Planiște and Ogrindova areas, Giroc has virtually joined Timișoara. It is bordered on the east by Urseni, on the southwest by Șag and on the west by Utvin. Timiș River flows through the south of the commune, which separates Giroc from Pădureni and Unip.

== History ==
The first recorded mention of Giroc dates back to 1371, in a document by which Sigismund of Luxembourg donated the Gyüreg estate to Vladislau, son of Ștefan de Taar. Throughout the Middle Ages, Giroc continued to be sporadically mentioned in various documents. Between 1453 and 1497 it appears under the Hungarian name Szent György (Saint George). What is certain is that, in 1456, Chișoda is mentioned as the property of John Hunyadi, which is why it is possible that Giroc had the same status. Later, Marsigli's conscriptions from 1690–1700 speak of Gyirog. After the Austrian conquest of Banat, Giroc appears on the 1717 map with the name Jurok, listed with 70 houses and later on Mercy's map from 1723 with the name Jurak.

After the Hungarian Revolution of 1848 and the abolition of serfdom, Giroc experienced a marked development, although it also suffered heavy flooding in 1859 and a severe drought between 1863 and 1864. As a result of the floods, Timiș River was dammed in Giroc; damming works began in 1874. In the second half of the 19th century, Giroc benefited from the general modernization that included Banat, being in turn connected to the postal network, to the telegraphic one and then to the Timișoara–Baziaș railway, one of the first railways in Banat, connecting Timișoara to the Danubian port Baziaș, put into use in 1858. In 1897, Atanasie Baicu founded the people's bank Giroceana, a rural credit institution that supported Romanian peasants to buy agricultural land, offering them much more advantageous loans that they could receive from Timișoara banks. The bank has played a key role in modernizing agriculture and significantly increasing general welfare.

After the union of Banat with Romania, in 1921, the Hungarian barons were expropriated and the land was redistributed to the peasants. During the same period, the official name changed from Gyüreg to the Romanian Giroc. After World War II, Giroc underwent nationalization and collectivization, then partial industrialization and experienced an increase in migration and commuting. The first years after the Romanian Revolution marked a period of stagnation, but Giroc currently benefits from a favorable position and conjuncture, being one of the richest communes in Timiș County.

== Demographics ==
Giroc had 22,270 inhabitants at the 2021 census, up 165.56% from the 2011 census.

Until World War I, there was a general increase in population due to both natural and migratory growth. During World War I the population decreases, then goes through a period of relative stagnation until World War II, when it decreases again. After that, it started to grow, especially after 1960, when several families from the rest of the country began to settle in Giroc, especially from Caraș-Severin County and Transylvania (especially Bihor).

The development of Timișoara's industry, the need for labor and the impossibility of settling in Timișoara, this being a closed city, determined many families to settle in Giroc, where they buy houses or live in rent and from where they commute to Timișoara, especially after, in 1963, the bus from Timișoara to Giroc is established. In January 1977, 145 households and 545 inhabitants outside the actual hearth of Giroc are detached and administratively transferred to Timișoara, to form the current Fratelia B neighborhood, attached to the city.

After declining in the late 1980s and early 1990s, the population stabilized and began to rise again. Both Germans and Hungarians were significantly reduced in number, and the Romanian majority strengthened. Especially after 2000, amid the development of the local economy, there is an increased development of the real estate industry, which also entails a significant increase of the population.

=== Ethnic composition ===
Ethnic composition (2021)
1. Romanians (76.2%)
2. Hungarians (1.40%)
3. Unknown (20.5%)
4. Others (1.92%)
Religious composition (2021)
1. Orthodox (65.0%)
2. Roman Catholics (3.74%)
3. Baptists (2.05%)
4. Pentecostals (1.94%)
5. Unknown (22.6%)
6. Others (2.54%)
7. Irreligious, atheists and agnostics (2.20%)

According to the 2021 census, the majority of the inhabitants are Romanians (76.16%), with a minority of Hungarians (1.4%). For 20.52% of the population, ethnicity is unknown. The inhabitants were for a long time mostly Romanian Orthodox. Between 1865 and 1870, the first colonization of Giroc took place with German families from Grabaț, Lenauheim and Variaș. Between 1910 and 1912, a new wave of German settlers from Nițchidorf arrived in Giroc.

Census		Ethnic composition
Year	Population	Romanians	Hungarians	Germans
1880	3,033	2,813	31	173
1890	3,467	3,006	51	402
1900	3,903	3,195	192	492
1910	5,368	3,233	846	1,155
1920	3,574	2,862	164	513
1930	3,610	2,799	167	576
1941	3,702	2,856	228	570
1956	3,393	2,760	162	430
1966	4,452	3,601	298	499
1977	4,891	4,168	182	440
1992	3,951	3,645	128	96
2002	4,295	4,060	112	61
2011	8,388	7,586	151	66
2021	22,270	16,961	313	100

=== Religious composition ===
According to the 2021 census, most of the inhabitants are Orthodox (64.95%), but there are also minorities of Roman Catholics (3.74%), Baptists (2.05%) and Pentecostals (1.94%). For 22.58% of the population, religious affiliation is unknown. There are two Romanian Orthodox churches, two Pentecostal churches and two Baptist churches in the commune.

== Politics and administration ==
The commune of Giroc is administered by a mayor and a local council composed of 19 councilors. The mayor, Dan Vîrtosu, from the National Liberal Party, has been in office since 2024. As from the 2024 local elections, the local council has the following composition by political parties:

Party	Seats	Composition
National Liberal Party	8	
Save Romania Union–People's Movement Party–Force of the Right	6	
Social Democratic Party	3	
Alliance for the Union of Romanians	2	

== Economy ==
Giroc plays an important role for the economy of Timișoara, as it has established itself as a labor force reserve, and in recent years has begun to host several firms attracted by the economy of Timișoara, but which have settled in neighboring areas. In Giroc and Chișoda there are a total of almost 2,000 firms. On the territory belonging to Chișoda is the Șagului industrial platform. The economic development of the commune is also reflected in the size of the built-up area, which increased sixfold between 2009 and 2019.

== Notable people ==
- Aurel Jivi (1943–2002), professor and priest
- Petrică Moise (1947–2021), singer and composer of folk music
