= Aurell =

Aurell is a surname. Notable people with the surname include:

- Martin Aurell (1958–2025), Spanish-French historian and academic
- Tage Aurell (1895–1976), Swedish journalist, novelist and translator
