= Shopping City Timișoara =

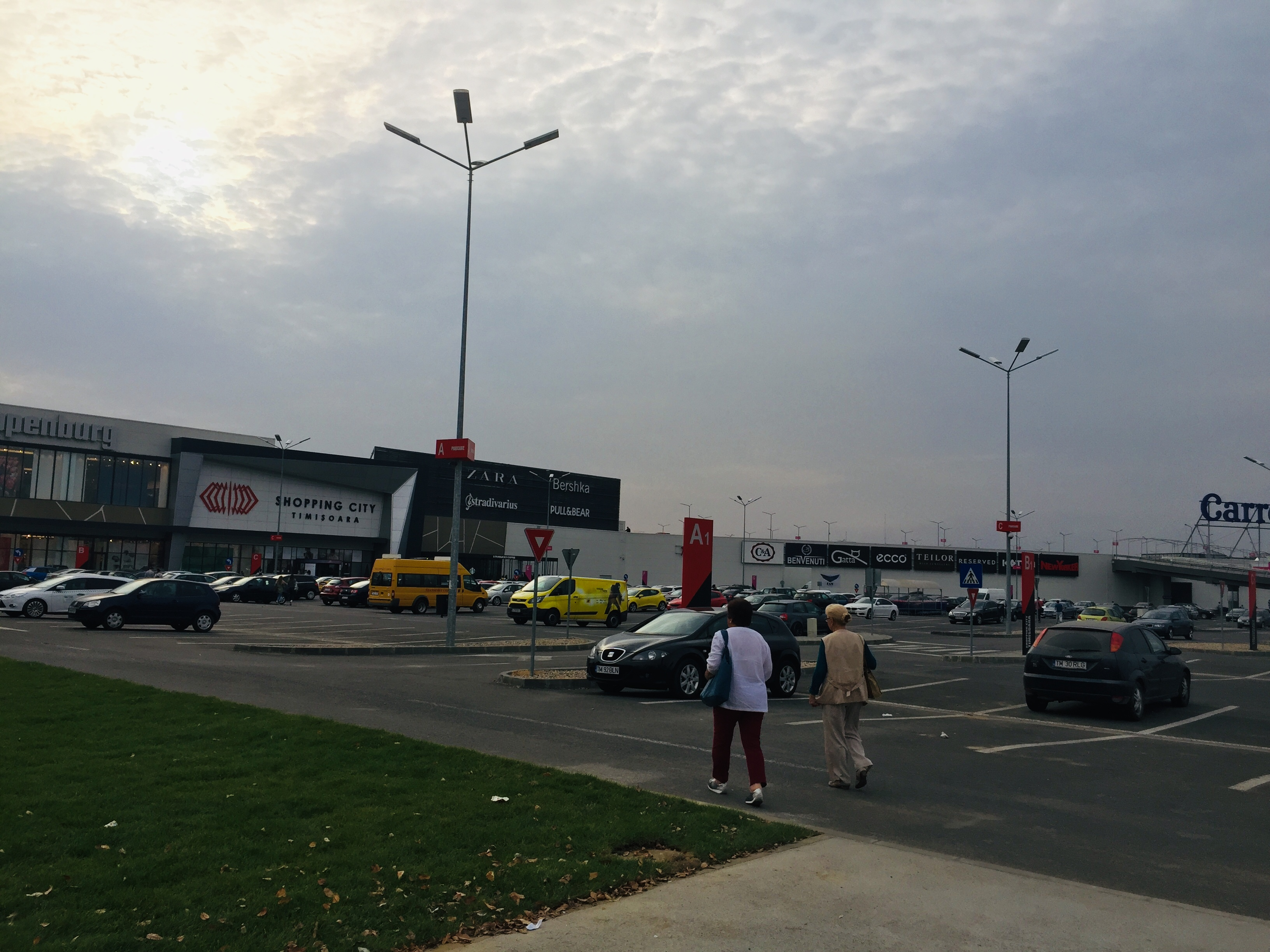
- Location: Timișoara, Romania
- Coordinates: 45°43′26.33″N 21°11′58.33″E
- Opened: 31 March 2016
- Owner: NEPI Rockcastle
- Num. of stores: 110
- Num. of anchor tenants: 2
- Floor area: 70,000 m^{2} (750,000 sq ft)
- Floors: 2
- Parking: 2,700
- Public transit: Bus lines 33, E1, E8; Tram line 2
- Website: shoppingcitytm.ro

Shopping City Timișoara is a shopping mall located in Timișoara, Romania. At the time of its completion, it was the second shopping mall in Timișoara. In the first year since its opening in 2016, Shopping City Timișoara had a traffic of over nine million visitors.

Currently, the project is undergoing expansion through a residential area comprising 400 apartments in high-rise buildings, representing an investment of over €21 million.

== History ==
The shopping center was developed in two stages on the former site of the Dermatina synthetic leather factory, originally established in 1934 and acquired in July 2014. The first phase opened in November 2015, featuring the region's first Carrefour hypermarket and the largest Media Galaxy store in the area, along with additional retailers. The second phase was completed in March 2016, bringing the total investment to €83.8 million.

The structure was conceived as a single-level retail gallery with two main entrances, topped by a leisure zone that includes a food court, entertainment venues, and a cinema.

== Facilities ==
The mall is built on an 18-hectare plot of land and has a leasable area of 70,000 m^{2}. The two-story construction has 110 shops, 2,700 on-site and above-ground parking spaces with electric/hybrid car charging stations, a self-service car wash and bicycle racks. It has a 13-screen Cinema City multiplex with IMAX and 4DX halls which is the first and only cinema in Romania with these technologies in one cinema. With a total capacity of 2,400 seats and an area of 4,000 m^{2}, it is the largest multiplex outside Bucharest. 10,000 m^{2} of its leasable area are occupied by a Carrefour hypermarket, and 16,000 m^{2} by a Dedeman DIY store. The mall also includes a food court, a fitness center with a semi-Olympic swimming pool, a casino, a seasonal ice rink, terraces and a 350-square-meter children's playground.

== Residential development ==
Shopping City Timișoara includes a residential component, represented by a housing development comprising 400 apartments, which will be built in the immediate vicinity of the shopping center. The investment is estimated at over €21 million.
