= Parța =

- Commune
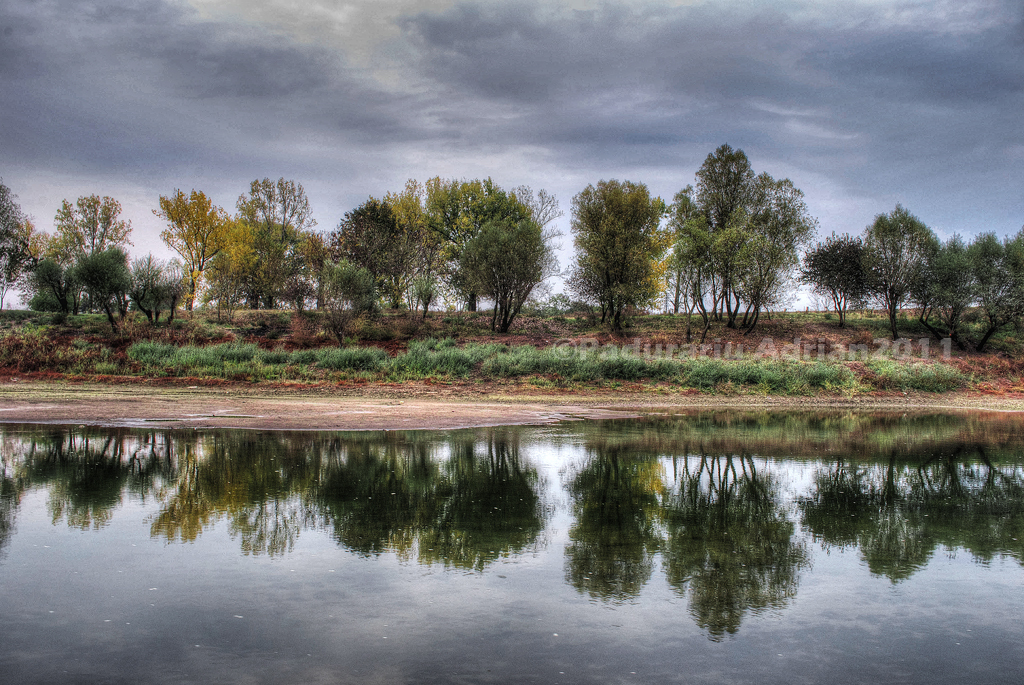
- Timiș River in Parța

- Location in Timiș County

- Location in Romania
- Coordinates: 45°38′N 21°8′E
- Country: Romania
- County: Timiș

Government
  - Mayor (2020–): Daniel Drăgan (PNL)
- Area: 61.37 km^{2} (23.70 sq mi)
- Elevation: 86 m (282 ft)
- Population (2021-12-01): 2,351
  - Density: 38.31/km^{2} (99.22/sq mi)
- Time zone: UTC+02:00 (EET)
  - Summer (DST): UTC+03:00 (EEST)
- Postal code: 307396
- Vehicle reg.: TM
- Website: www.primariaparta.ro

Parța (Hungarian: Parác; German: Paratz; Serbian: Парац, romanized: Parac) is a commune in Timiș County, Romania. It is composed of a single village, Parța, and was part of Șag commune until 2004.

== History ==
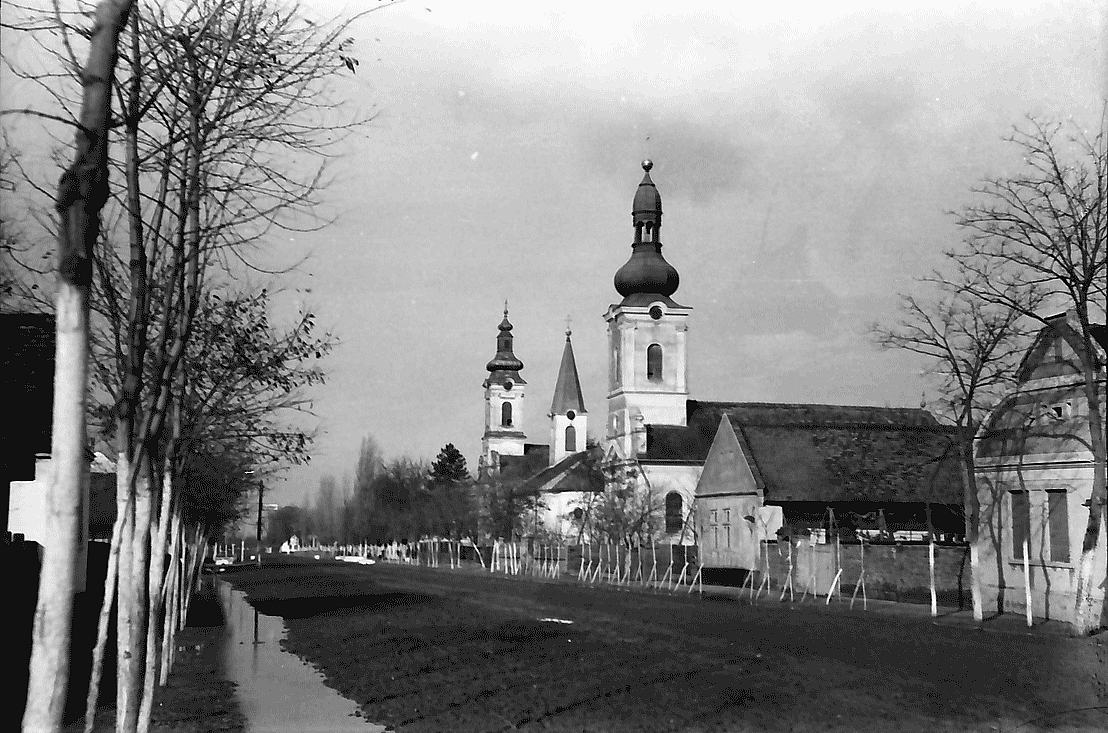
Parța and its three churches (Serbian Orthodox, Roman Catholic, and Greek Catholic) in 1943

Parța was first documented in 1334 as Parkas, and in 1417 the settlement of Maraz, with town (market) status, is recorded near Parța. At the conscription (census) carried out in 1717 by the Austrians, after the conquest of Banat, the settlement had 84 houses and was called Paraz.

In 1878, during the regularization of the Timiș River, traces of a Neolithic settlement on three levels were discovered here, in which pottery specific to the Vinča culture was found. The first systematic excavations of the site began in 1931 and were completed only in 1985. Over the course of five decades, the following have been discovered here: two Neolithic sanctuaries, one with monumental statues, relocated and restored in Timișoara's National Museum of Banat, another overlapping the first one from which only one altar has been preserved, household shrines or altars, about 150 houses and complexes and four dwellings with 4–5 rooms, some of which have a suspended floor or an upper floor.

== Demographics ==
Ethnic composition (2021)
1. Romanians (81.5%)
2. Roma (3.27%)
3. Hungarians (1.99%)
4. Serbs (1.23%)
5. Unknown (11.3%)
6. Others (0.63%)
Religious composition (2021)
1. Orthodox (52.1%)
2. Greek Catholics (15.3%)
3. Pentecostals (11.1%)
4. Roman Catholics (5.82%)
5. Baptists (1.19%)
6. Unknown (11.9%)
7. Others (1.73%)
8. Irreligious, atheists and agnostics (0.72%)

Parța had a population of 2,351 inhabitants at the 2021 census, up 8.24% from the 2011 census. Most inhabitants are Romanians (81.53%), larger minorities being represented by Roma (3.27%), Hungarians (1.99%) and Serbs (1.23%). For 11.35% of the population, ethnicity is unknown. By religion, most inhabitants are Orthodox (52.14%), but there are also minorities of Greek Catholics (15.31%), Pentecostals (11.14%), Roman Catholics (5.82%) and Baptists (1.19%). For 11.95% of the population, religious affiliation is unknown.

| Census | | Ethnic composition |
| Year | Population | Romanians | Hungarians | Germans | Roma | Serbs |
|---|---|---|---|---|---|---|
| 1880 | 2,226 | 1,455 | 160 | 290 | – | 297 |
| 1890 | 2,744 | 1,543 | 411 | 489 | – | 281 |
| 1900 | 2,813 | 1,444 | 521 | 541 | – | 284 |
| 1910 | 2,739 | 1,333 | 543 | 559 | – | 252 |
| 1920 | 2,761 | 1,346 | 567 | 539 | – | – |
| 1930 | 2,633 | 1,498 | 367 | 527 | 22 | 194 |
| 1941 | 2,404 | 1,310 | 448 | 438 | – | – |
| 1956 | 2,021 | – | – | – | – | – |
| 1966 | 1,935 | 1,136 | 341 | 277 | 27 | 138 |
| 1977 | 2,034 | 1,358 | 277 | 208 | 60 | 120 |
| 1992 | 1,420 | 1,066 | 150 | 78 | 56 | 65 |
| 2002 | 1,752 | 1,412 | 129 | 61 | 88 | 59 |
| 2011 | 2,172 | 1,747 | 129 | 43 | 101 | 44 |
| 2021 | 2,351 | 1,917 | 47 | 7 | 77 | 29 |

== Politics and administration ==
The commune of Parța is administered by a mayor and a local council composed of 11 councilors. The mayor, Daniel Drăgan, from the National Liberal Party, has been in office since 2020. As of the 2024 local elections, the local council has the following composition by political parties:

| Party | Seats | Composition |
|---|---|---|
| National Liberal Party | 6 | |
| Social Democratic Party | 4 | |
| Save Romania Union | 1 | |

== Notable people ==
- Stelian Olariu (1928–2017), conductor
