= Aurel Jivi =

Aurel Jivi (1943–2002) was a priest in the Romanian Orthodox Church. He was a teacher and writer.

== Life ==
Jivi was born in Chişoda, Timiș County, Romania, on August 2, 1943. He took his first degree from the Sibiu Theological Institute in 1967 and then a master's degree in Theology from McCormick Theological Seminary, Chicago in 1973. He completed his doctoral studies at the Bucharest Theological Institute in 1982, with a dissertation on "Orthodoxy in America".

He became a full-time professor at the Sibiu Theological Institute, Department of Universal Church History, in 1983; he also taught at the Faculty of Theology in Oradea, and lectured for several universities in the United States and Great Britain. He was ordained an Orthodox priest in 1993. Father Jivi wrote extensively on topics related to his field of research, but he was also a proficient translator. He died in Sibiu, in 2002.

== Works (in Romanian) ==
- Sfântul Ioan Hrisostom arhipăstor la Constantinopol. în MB, an. XIX. 1969, nr. 4–6, p. 226-235;
- Literatura teologică bizantină în preocupările lui Nicolae lorga, în BOR, an. LXXXVIII, 1969, nr. 11–12, p. 1248–1256;
- Biserica Ortodoxă din Cipru şi situaţia ei actuală, ST, an. XXII, 1970, nr. 1 -2, p. 118-128,
- Patriarhia Ortodoxă de la 1920 până în prezent, în ST, an. XXII, 1970, nr. 5 -6, p. 452-460;
- Relaţiile Mitropoliei de la Carloviţ cu Biscrica Ortodoxă Română din Transilvania în secolul al XVIII-lea, în BOR, an. LXXXVIII, 1970, nr. 5–6, p. 587–596;
- Opere teologice bizantine editate în ţările române de către patriarhul Dositei al Ierusalimului, în ST, an. XXVII, 1975, nr. 3–4, p. 219–225;
- Insemnări despre biserici şi mănăstiri din Tara Românească în jurnalul de călătorie al unui preot englez la 1794, în BOR, an. XCIX, 1981, nr. 78, p. 912–917;
- 1600 de ani de la Sinodul II ecumenic. Valoarea ecumenică a Simbolului niceo-constantionpolitan, în ST, an. XXXIII, 1981, nr. 7-10, p. 606–613;
- Contribuţii la istoria relaşiilor ecumenice romano-anglicane, în ST. an. XXXVI, 1984, nr. 7–8, p. 482–493;
- Sinodul al VII – lea ecumenic, în MMS, an. LXIII, 1987, nr. 5. p. 101–111,
- Studii şi cercetări transilvănene privind Istoria Bisericească Universală, în vol. Contribuţii transilvănene la teologia ortodoxă, Sibiu, 1988, p. 101–118;
- Corespondenţa arhiereului Teodor Trandafir Scorobeţi cu teologi anglicani, în RT, an. I (73), 1991, nr. 2, p. 23–32;
- Din istoria primară a Bisericii, în vol. Credinţă ortodoxă şi viaţă creştină, Sibiu, 1992 p. 39-57;
- Relaţiile patriarhului Ciril Lucaris cu protestanţii transilvăneni, în RT, an. II (74), 1992, nr. 3. p. 17–27:
- Cyril Lucarisţties with Transylvanian Preotestants, în vol. Persoană şi comuniune, Prinos de cinstire Pr. Prof Acad. Dumitru Stăniloaie, Sibiu, 1993, p. 386–397.

== Translations (from English) ==
- Keith Hitchins, Ortodoxie şi naţionalitate. Andrei Şaguna şi românii din Transilvania. 1846–1873. București, 1995, 343p.
- Other articles and reviews published in: "Biserica Ortodoxă Română", "Studii Teologice", "Mitropolia Ardealului", "Ecumenical Review", and "Byzantinoslavica".
