= Șag =

- Commune
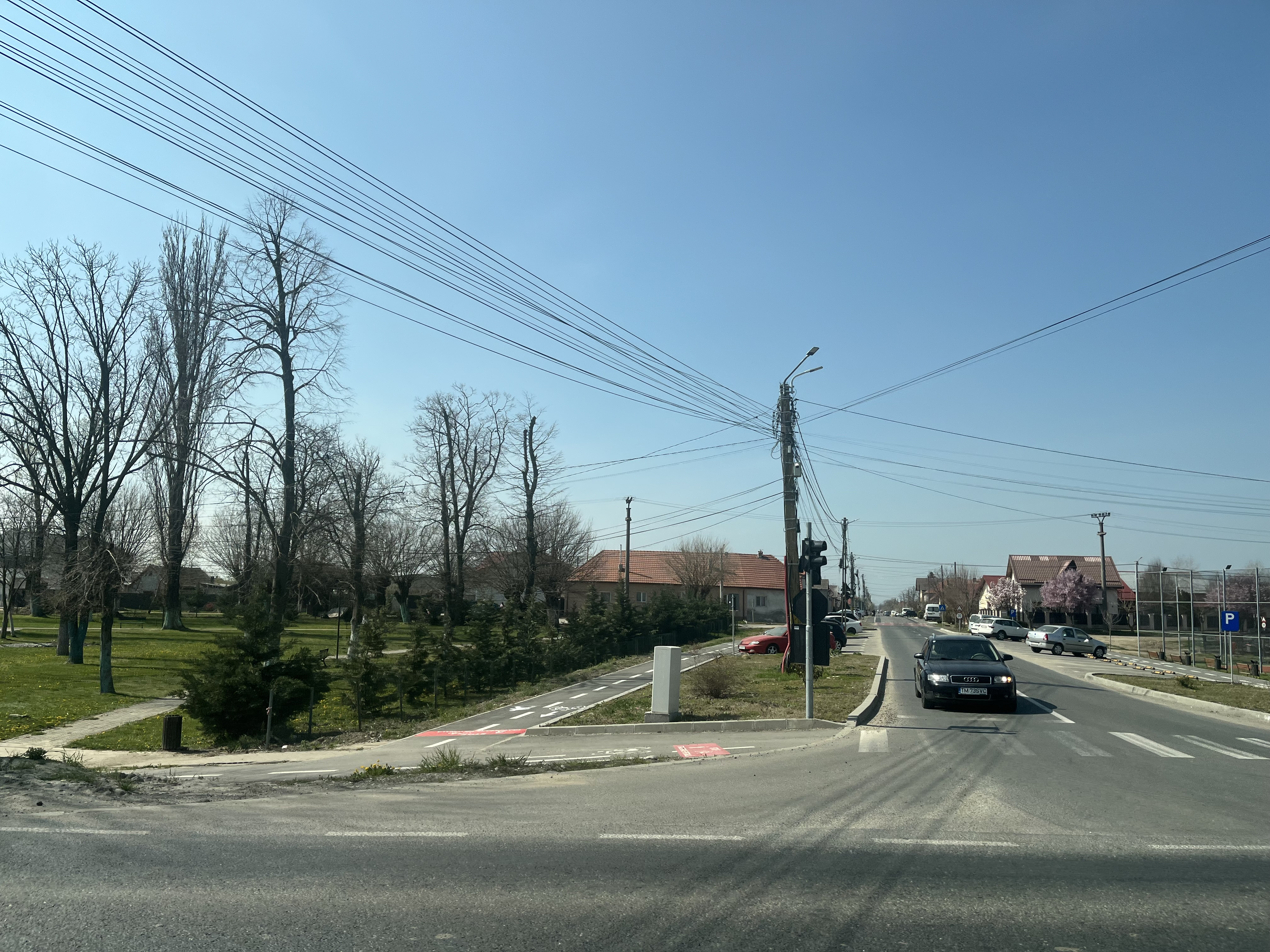

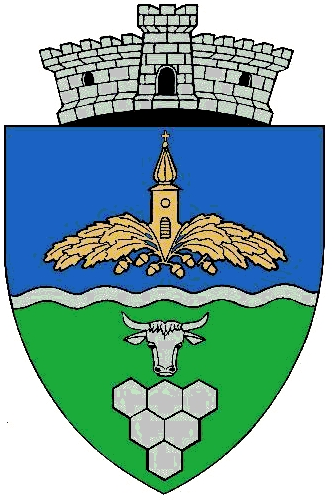
- Coat of arms

- Location in Timiș County

- Location in Romania
- Coordinates: 45.6517°N 21.1669°E
- Country: Romania
- County: Timiș

Government
  - Mayor (2016–): Flavius-Alin Roșu (PSD)
- Area: 34.02 km^{2} (13.14 sq mi)
- Population (2021-12-01): 5,303
  - Density: 155.9/km^{2} (403.7/sq mi)
- Time zone: UTC+02:00 (EET)
  - Summer (DST): UTC+03:00 (EEST)
- Postal code: 307395
- Vehicle reg.: TM
- Website: www.primariasag.ro

Șag (Hungarian: Temesság; German: Schag; Serbian: Шаг, romanized: Šag) is a commune in Timiș County, Romania. It is composed of a single village, Șag; Parța village broke off as a separate commune in 2004.

== Geography ==
Șag is a plain commune, located in the Banat Plain, in the periurban area of Timișoara, 13 km (8.1 mi) away. Șag is situated on the right bank of the Timiș River. On the territory of Șag commune, the Timiș River is dammed on both banks. Șag borders Timișoara to the north, Sânmihaiu Român to the northwest, Parța to the southwest, Pădureni to the south and Giroc to the east.

Due to its position, Șag commune is part of the transitional continental climate with influences of the sub-Mediterranean climate, and the diversity and irregularity of the atmospheric processes is characteristic of it.

The characteristic vegetation is that of the forest-steppe and is influenced by the vicinity of the southern European geobotanical province.

== History ==
=== Prehistory ===
According to the archeological researches and some objects found in the Timiș River, it seems that the nucleus of the village dates from the 4th–5th millennium BC. In 1962, a pirogue (rudimentary boat) made of oak wood, the remains of some clay objects dating from the 4th–5th millennium BC, as well as the remains of a Roman earth wall were discovered here.

=== First recorded mention ===
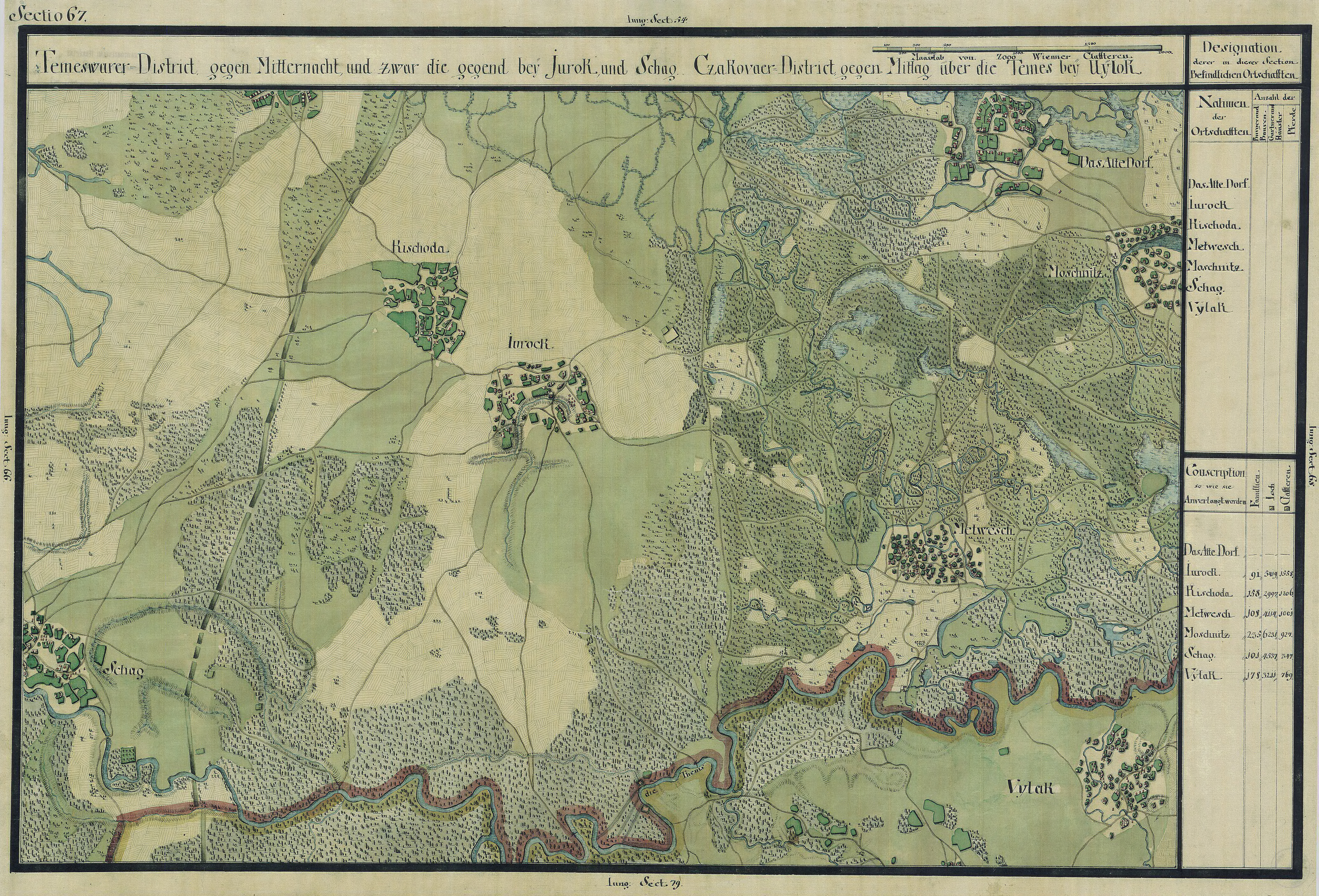
Șag (Schag) on the Josephinische Landesaufnahme of 1769–1772

Șag is first mentioned in the papal tithe records of 1332 as Sad, in Old Serbian meaning "to step over water". The settlement was inhabited during the Middle Ages, because between 1404–1425 it appears in documents as the property of Count Laurențiu Șaghi.

In 1660, the first Romanian Orthodox church was built of wood, and the first priest was Ioan Vuia. On this occasion, the first pew school appears, in which those who dealt with the administration of the locality studied books in Romanian.

In 1717 it appears in the chamber records under the name of Sasch with 65 houses, the toponym being spelled in the kaiserlich-königlich language.

=== Damming of Timiș River and sanitation of swamps ===
In 1759, Dutch engineer Maximilian Emmanuel Fremaut implemented a plan to dam the Timiș River, which is given a straight riverbed, and the multitude of arms that formed swamps spread over the entire southern part of Timișoara are gradually dried up and dismantled. Thus arises the riverbed that exists today, in approximately the same configuration. But more importantly, the sanitation of the swampy land on which the village lasted for hundreds of years has important consequences for the further development of the locality. Agricultural land is becoming larger, richer and more attractive to those who want to settle here. If the first attempts at colonization with Germans failed due to diseases, later the settlers began to willingly move here.

Also, the repeated dammings of Timiș (1759–1769, 1889–1900, 1912–1914) make the locality to be protected from floods and consequently lead to a spectacular growth of agriculture, translated into a high wellbeing of its inhabitants.

=== Modern history ===
1776 saw the construction of a new Romanian Orthodox church, built of burnt, painted and renovated brick. The first school with teaching in Romanian, the "Trivial School" of Greek Oriental rite, also opened in 1776. In 1784 is mentioned the first mayor of the locality, Giurgi Giurca (George Jurca), who together with other villagers donates to the church the books necessary for the Holy Mass (these books come from the printing houses in Râmnic and Buda).

In 1821 the settlement and the estate came into the possession of the diocese of Csanád. This recruited German seasonal workers from the surrounding villages who settled in Șag. The first German settlers came in 1823 from Freidorf, Giarmata, Sânandrei, Carani, Biled, Lovrin, Cărpiniș, Iecea Mare, Iecea Mică, Comloșu Mare, Jimbolia, Nakovo and Srpska Crnja. Around 1830 several Czech families moved here, and in 1892 the first Hungarian family settled in Șag.

The Roman Catholic church was built in 1884. The Mihai Viteazul National House (today the cultural center) was built in 1936. The Timișeni Monastery was founded by Metropolitan Vasile Lăzărescu in 1944.

== Demographics ==
Ethnic composition (2021)
1. Romanians (84.3%)
2. Hungarians (3.16%)
3. Unknown (9.93%)
4. Others (2.59%)
Religious composition (2021)
1. Orthodox (74.0%)
2. Roman Catholics (7.37%)
3. Pentecostals (2.80%)
4. Baptists (1.16%)
5. Unknown (11.2%)
6. Others (2.34%)
7. Irreligious, atheists and agnostics (1.22%)

Șag had a population of 5,303 inhabitants at the 2021 census, up 76.19% from the 2011 census. Most inhabitants are Romanians (84.32%), with a minority of Hungarians (3.16%). For 9.93% of the population, ethnicity is unknown. By religion, most inhabitants are Orthodox (73.95%), but there are also minorities of Roman Catholics (7.37%), Pentecostals (2.8%) and Baptists (1.16%). For 11.16% of the population, religious affiliation is unknown.

Census		Ethnic composition
Year	Population	Romanians	Hungarians	Germans
1880	2,243	742	66	1,401
1890	2,674	827	191	1,643
1900	2,564	808	231	1,514
1910	2,421	753	322	1,335
1920	2,364	720	262	1,377
1930	2,302	715	304	1,245
1941	2,280	688	364	1,200
1956	2,174	–	–	–
1966	2,811	1,561	575	647
1977	3,052	1,857	563	600
1992	2,586	1,994	400	155
2002	2,754	2,278	339	94
2011	3,009	2,497	271	59
2021	5,303	4,472	168	49

== Politics and administration ==
The commune of Șag is administered by a mayor and a local council composed of 15 councilors. The mayor, Flavius-Alin Roșu, from the Social Democratic Party, has been in office since 2016. As from the 2024 local elections, the local council has the following composition by political parties:

Party	Seats	Composition
Social Democratic Party–Social Liberal Humanist Party	9	
Democratic Alliance of Hungarians in Romania	2	
National Liberal Party	2	
Save Romania Union	1	
Alliance for the Union of Romanians	1	
