= Căile Ferate Române Line 200 =

Căile Ferate Române train line in Romania

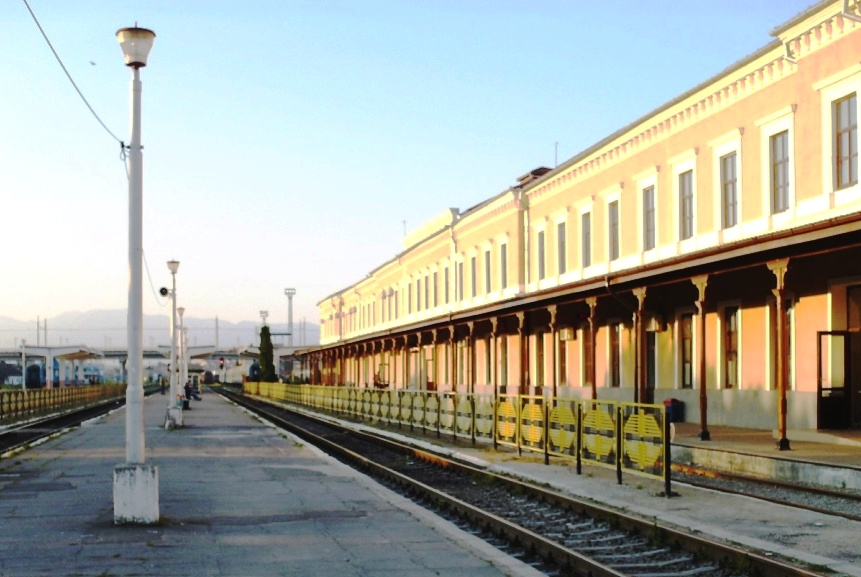
- Sibiu railway station

Overview
- Owner: Romanian State
- Locale: Arad, Brașov, Gorj, Hunedoara, Olt, Sibiu, Timiș, Vâlcea
- Stations: 43

Service
- Operator(s): Căile Ferate Române

Technical
- Track gauge: 1,435 mm (4 ft 8 1/2 in) standard gauge
Route map

Line 200 is one of CFR's main lines in Romania having a total length of 500 km (310 mi) and passing through important cities like Alba Iulia, Arad, Brașov, Deva, Hunedoara, Râmnicu Vâlcea, Sibiu, Târgu Jiu and Timișoara.

== Secondary lines ==
Line	Terminal stations		Intermediate stops	Length (km)
200	Brașov	Curtici	Codlea, Făgăraș, Avrig, Podu Olt, Tălmaciu, Sibiu, Sebeș, Vințu de Jos, Simeria, Deva, Ilia, Radna, Arad	500
200A	Teiuș	Vințu de Jos	Coșlariu, Sântimbru, Alba Iulia	29
201	Piatra Olt	Podu Olt	Drăgășani, Băbeni, Băile Govora, Rîureni-Râmnicu Vâlcea-Călimănești, Cozia, Lotru, Turnu Roșu	164
202	Filiași	Simeria	Cărbunești, Târgu Jiu, Valea Sadului, Petroșani, Subcetate, Călan	202
203	Brașov	Zărnești	Bartolomeu, Cristian, Râșnov	27
204	Sibiu	Agnita & Vurpăr	Cornățel, Țichindeal, Coveș	62
205	Băbeni	Alunu	Sirineasa, Popești, Vâlcea, Cernișoara, Copăceni, Berești	41
206	Șibot	Cugir	Vinerea	12
207	Simeria	Hunedoara	Bircea Mare, Bircea Mică, Pestișu Mare	15
208	Sibiu	Copșa Mică	Băile Ocna Sibiului, Loamneș, Șeica Mare, Agârbiciu, Axente Sever	45
209	Deva	Brad	Păuliș, Băița, Ormindea	36
210	Alba Iulia	Zlatna	Bărăbanț, Ampoița, Poiana Ampoiului, Presaca Ampoiului, Feneș	42
211	Caransebeș	Subcetate	Oțelu Roșu, Băuțar, Sarmizegetusa, Hațeg	77
212	Ilia	Lugoj	Dobra, Holdea, Ohaba, Costeiu de Sus, Margina, Făget, Mănăștiur, Cliciova, Balinț, Coșteiu Mare	83
213	Radna	Timișoara North	Neudorf, Zăbrani, Remetea Mică, Fibiș, Pișchia, Giarmata, Timișoara East	68
214	Livezeni	Lupeni	Iscroni, Vulcan	17
215	Arad	Nădlac	Arad West, Pecica, Semlac, Șeitin	52
216	Arad	Vălcani	Aradul Nou, Zădăreni, Bodrogu Nou, Felnac, Sânpetru German, Munar, Secusigiu, Periam Port, Periam, Saravale, Sânnicolau Mare, Dudeștii Noi	87
217	Timișoara North	Nerău	Sânandrei, Chinezu, Gelu, Variaș, Periam, Lovrin, Gottlob, Comloșu Mare	93
218	Timișoara North	Cenad	Ronaț, Dudeștii Noi, Biled, Lovrin, Sânnicolau Mare	78
219	Lovrin	Nerău	Lovrin, Gottlob, Comloșu Mare	27
221	Filiași	Târgu Jiu	Turceni, Cârbești	76

Grey background indicates a closed line.
