= Galațca =

Coordinates: 45.9747°N 20.7217°E

- Location within Romania

Location
- Country: Romania, Serbia
- Counties: Timiș County, Vojvodina
- Cities: Kikinda
- Villages: Pesac, Lovrin, Tomnatic, Vizejdia, Comloșu Mare

Physical characteristics
- Source: Banat Plain, Romania
- Mouth: Bega
  - location: Serbia

Basin features
- Progression: Bega→ Tisza→ Danube→ Black Sea

The Galațca river (Serbian: Галацка, romanized: Galacka or Галадска/Galadska) is a tributary of the Bega river. It originates in Romania and crosses the border into Serbia. It follows the course of a former channel of the river Mureș. Today, the large part of this river is channelized, and lower part of its course is now included into the Kikinda Canal, part of the Danube-Tisa-Danube canal system. The course of the Galacka river through the city of Kikinda is now mostly made into an underground pipeline, except for a small part, through the Števančeva bara (pond).
