= Teremia oil field =

Oil field in Romania

Teremia
- Country: Romania
- Region: Timiș County
- Offshore/onshore: onshore
- Operator: Petrom

Field history
- Discovery: 1968
- Start of development: 1968
- Start of production: 1970

Production
- Current production of oil: 800 barrels per day (~40,000 t/a)
- Estimated oil in place: 2 million tonnes (~ 2.4×10^{6} m^{3} or 15 million bbl)

The Teremia oil field is an oil field located in Teremia Mare, Timiș County. It was discovered in 1968 and developed by Petrom. It began production in 1970 and produces oil. The total proven reserves of the Teremia oil field are around 15 million barrels (2 million tonnes), and production is centered on 800 barrels per day (130 m^{3}/d).
