= Gottlob, Timiș =

Gottlob
- Commune
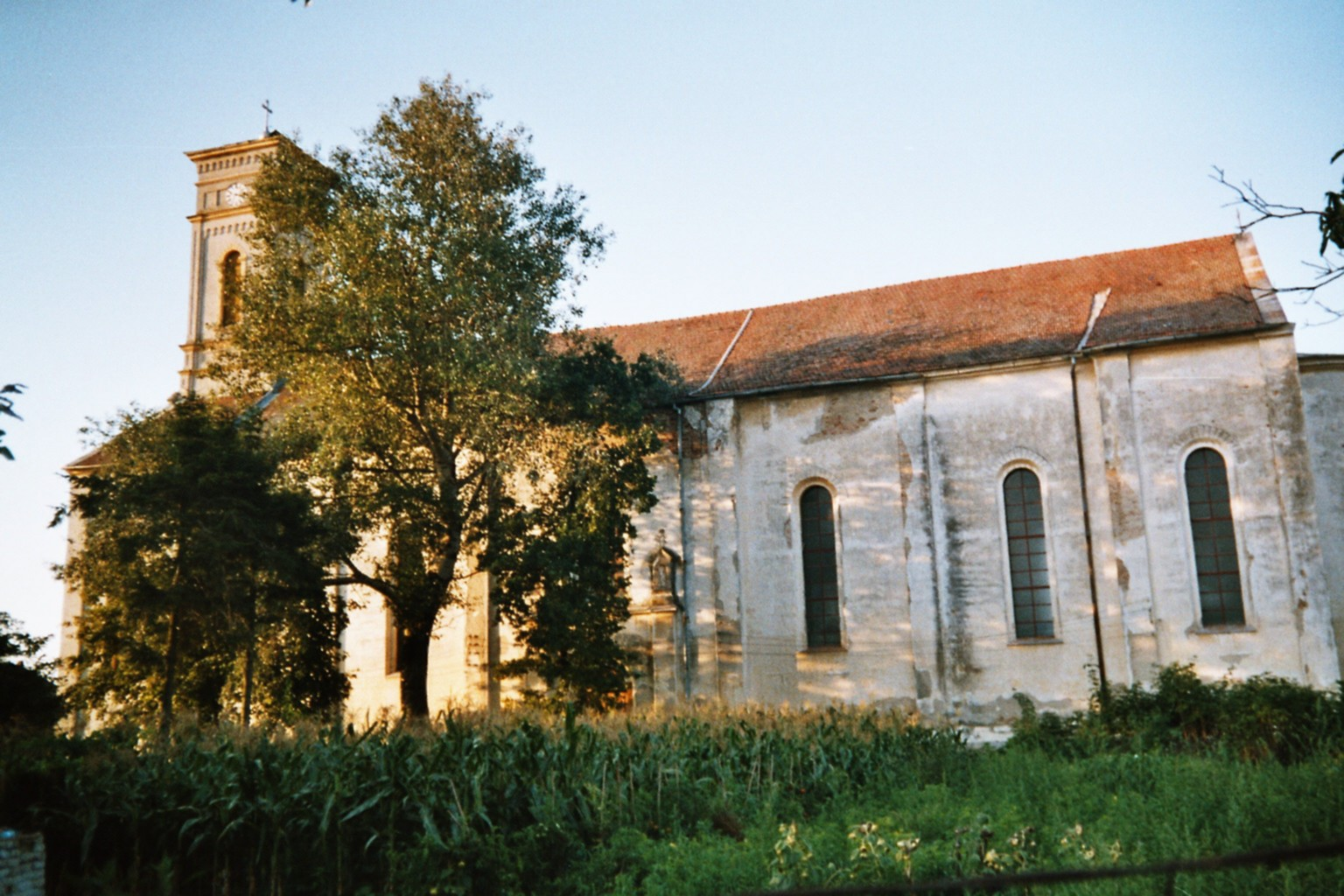
- The Roman Catholic church in Gottlob in 2004

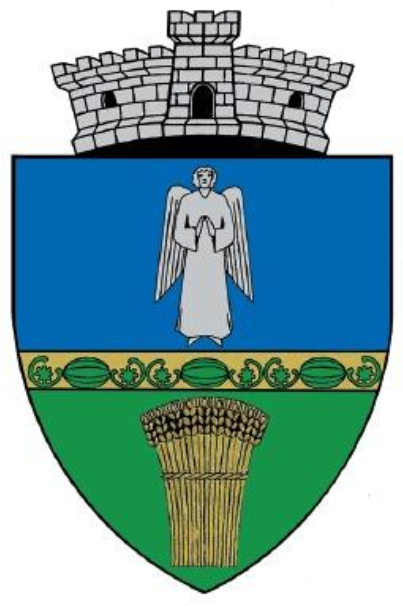
- Coat of arms

- Location in Timiș County

- Location in Romania
- Coordinates: 45°56′N 20°43′E
- Country: Romania
- County: Timiș
- Established: 1773

Government
  - Mayor (2004–): Gheorghe Nastor (PNL)
- Area: 39.85 km^{2} (15.39 sq mi)
- Population (2021-12-01): 1,822
  - Density: 45.72/km^{2} (118.4/sq mi)
- Time zone: UTC+02:00 (EET)
  - Summer (DST): UTC+03:00 (EEST)
- Postal code: 307251–307252
- Vehicle reg.: TM
- Website: www.primariagottlob.ro

Gottlob (German: Gottlob; Hungarian: Kisősz) is a commune in Timiș County, Romania. It is composed of two villages, Gottlob (commune seat) and Vizejdia. These were part of the commune of Lovrin until 2004, when they were split off.

== Etymology ==
The commune's name is of German origin, meaning "Praise to the Lord". Legend has it that the first settlers reached these lands amid a torrential downpour, which miraculously ceased when they arrived at the site of the future village. Overjoyed by this sign, they lifted their hands to the sky and exclaimed, 'Gott lob!'

== History ==
Present-day Gottlob was founded in 1773, at the same time as the neighboring village of Tomnatic, on a territory that was inhabited in the more distant past. Between 1770 and 1773, the administration, under the guidance of Chamber Councilor Hildebrand (according to other sources, Captain Tribaustter), would build 203 houses in Gottlob for German (Swabian) settlers. The Catholic parish was also founded in 1773. The vast majority of the settlers who founded Gottlob came from Luxembourg and Lorraine, but also from Alsace, Mainz, Trier, Franconia and a few other localities in Banat.

Gottlob has had a school since 1771. The estate passed in 1781 to Baron Anton Lipthay of Lovrin, scion of a long-established noble family. In 1836, a cholera outbreak devastated the population. Between 1866 and 1867, the villagers financed the construction of the Roman Catholic church. By 1880, oil lamps were lighting the streets of Gottlob.

In 1912, Gottlob was described as a large village situated along the Kikinda–Arad railway line. It comprised 590 houses and a population of 2,199. The village also featured a savings bank and a brick kiln. That same year, its streets were illuminated by electric lighting. By 1936, Gottlob had a primary school, both male and mixed choirs, three brass bands, and several local institutions, including a tile factory, a mill, a warehouse, and an agricultural association. The village also supported a sports society, a firefighters' association, and a monument honoring its heroes. It counted 626 houses and 1,969 inhabitants. In 1949, the village celebrated the opening of its cultural center.

Until 1940, Germans formed the majority of Gottlob's population. There was also a sizable French community. After World War II, their numbers dropped dramatically, from about 90% to less than 10% in 1992, with a continued decline throughout that decade. In 1945, 168 Germans were deported to Russia. Another 310 people were deported to Bărăgan between 1951–1956.

== Demographics ==
Ethnic composition (2021)
1. Romanians (81.1%)
2. Roma (4.39%)
3. Germans (2.08%)
4. Ukrainians (1.09%)
5. Unknown (10.3%)
6. Others (1.12%)
Religious composition (2021)
1. Orthodox (67.3%)
2. Pentecostals (8.83%)
3. Roman Catholics (8.01%)
4. Baptists (2.25%)
5. Unknown (12.2%)
6. Others (1.34%)

Gottlob had a population of 1,822 inhabitants at the 2021 census, down 10.73% from the 2011 census. Most inhabitants are Romanians (81.06%), larger minorities being represented by Roma (4.39%), Germans (2.08%) and Ukrainians (1.09%). For 10.26% of the population, ethnicity is unknown. By religion, most inhabitants are Orthodox (67.34%), but there are also minorities of Pentecostals (8.83%), Roman Catholics (8.01%) and Baptists (2.25%). For 12.23% of the population, religious affiliation is unknown.

Census		Ethnic composition
Year	Population	Romanians	Hungarians	Germans	Roma	Ukrainians
1880	3,202	116	68	3,000	–	–
1890	3,223	111	20	3,067	–	–
1900	3,271	245	75	2,935	–	–
1910	2,910	158	254	2,403	–	1
1920	3,047	185	206	2,593	–	–
1930	2,625	107	38	2,380	55	–
1941	2,706	246	94	2,201	–	–
1956	2,993	–	–	–	–	–
1966	3,026	1,277	103	1,528	48	1
1977	2,723	1,259	84	1,210	103	12
1992	2,071	1,530	57	277	146	24
2002	2,284	1,885	44	171	130	29
2011	2,041	1,758	28	81	83	20
2021	1,822	1,477	13	38	80	20

== Politics and administration ==
The commune of Gottlob is administered by a mayor and a local council composed of 11 councilors. The mayor, Gheorghe Nastor, from the National Liberal Party, has been in office since 2004. As from the 2024 local elections, the local council has the following composition by political parties:

Party	Seats	Composition
National Liberal Party	6	
Social Democratic Party	4	
Alliance for the Union of Romanians	1	

== Economy ==
The main occupation of Gottlob's residents is agriculture. Gottlob is noted for its watermelon crops. Cabbage, peppers, potatoes, tomatoes, cauliflower and onions are also grown. The largest blueberry plantation in western Romania was established in 2014 in Vizejdia.
