= Hansi Schmidt =

German handball player (1942–2023)

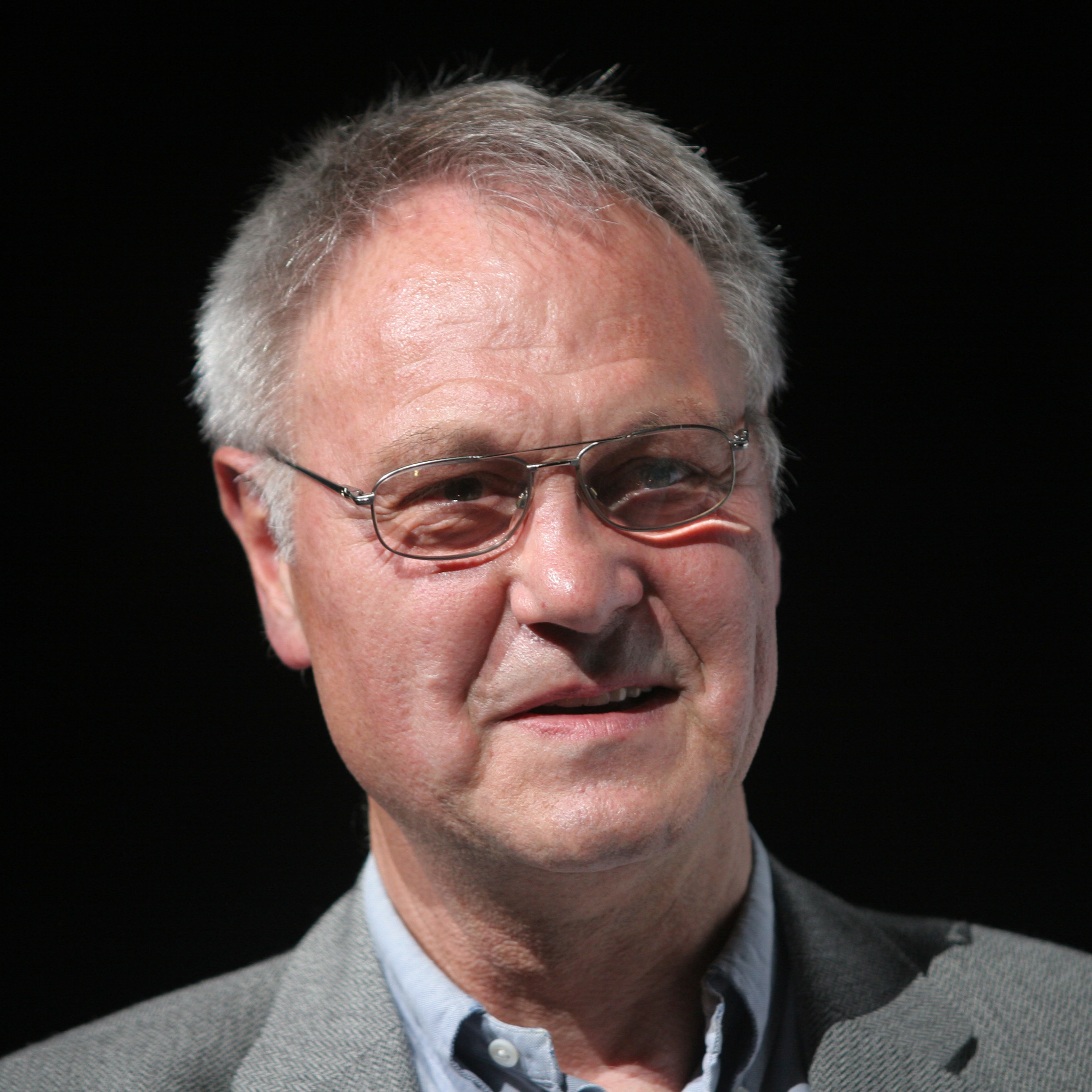
- Schmidt in 2008
- Born: Hans-Günther Schmidt; 23 September 1942; Teremia Mare, Romania
- Died: 5 February 2023 (aged 80)
- Occupation: Handball player

Hans-Günther Schmidt (24 September 1942 – 5 February 2023) was a Romanian-born German handball player.

== Biography ==
Schmidt was born on 24 September 1942, the son of a medical doctor. He first played for a handball team at age 12, later becoming Romanian national high school champion in shot put. After playing for Știința Timișoara and Știința Bucharest, he transferred to Steaua Bucharest, the military team.

Schmidt defected from Romania to West Germany when he was 21 years old during a match tour with the Romanian national youth team. Being a member of the military, he was sentenced to death for desertion.

In seven out of twelve German championships which VfL Gummersbach won in the Handball-Bundesliga, Hansi Schmidt played a crucial role as a goal scorer and playmaker. All in all, he played in ten finals for the German championship. Between 1967 and 1972 he became six times in a row top goal scorer of the Bundesliga's Northern League, the first five times also of the Bundesliga itself. In 1975 he became again top goal scorer of the Northern League.

In 2008, he was named one of the VfL's "All-Star-Team“.

Considered to be the inventor of the delayed jump shot in handball, he worked as a coach, and later as a physical education teacher, after retiring from active play.

Schmidt was married and had two children. He died on 5 February 2023, aged 80.

== Clubs ==
- 1959–1961 Știința Timișoara (Romanian first league)
- 1961 Știința Bucharest
- 1961–1963 Steaua Bucharest
- 1964–1976 VfL Gummersbach
- 1976–1979 TB Wülfrath
- TV Gelpetal (as a coach)
- 1981–1982 TuS Derschlag/playing coach

== Results ==
- 1959 Romanian indoor handball youth champion
- 1963 Romanian indoor champion with Steaua Bucharest
- 1966, 1967, 1969, 1973 till 1976 seven times German indoor handball champion with VfL Gummersbach
- 1967, 1970, 1971 and 1974 four times EHF Champions League winner with mit dem VfL Gummersbach
- Seven times top goal scorer of the Bundesliga's Northern League (1967–1972 and 1975)
- 173 Bundesliga games played, 1066 scored goals
- 338 goals in 53 EHF Champions League games
- 18 national team appearances for Romania
- 98 national games for Germany, 484 goals scored
- 3 nominations to the World Team

== Awards ==
- Silbernes Lorbeerblatt
- Sports Badge of Nordrhein-Westfalen
- Little Gold Medal of Gummersbach, 2006
