= Teremia Mare =

- Commune
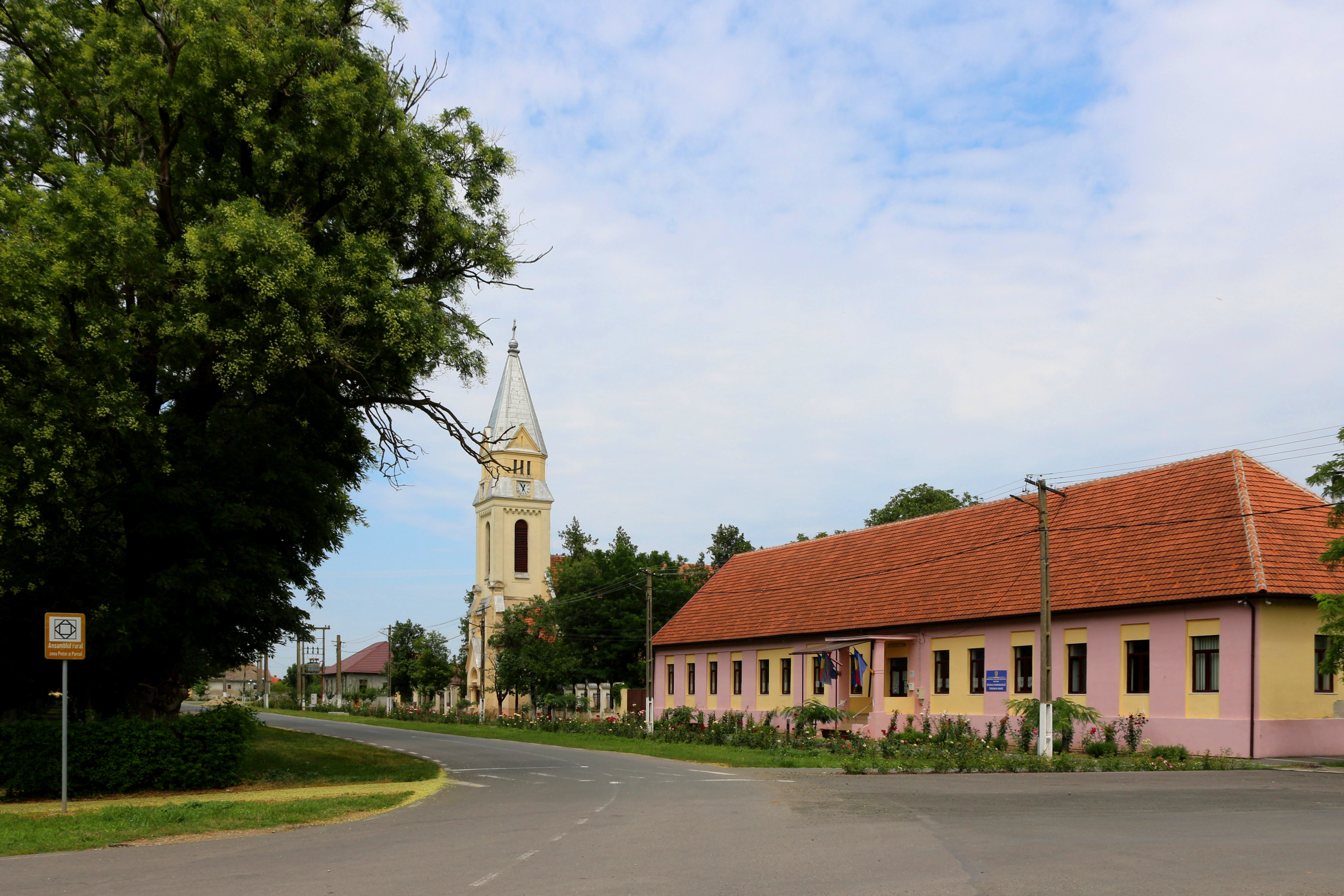
- The historical rural ensemble of the market area and the park

- Location in Timiș County

- Location in Romania
- Coordinates: 45°56′N 20°31′E
- Country: Romania
- County: Timiș

Government
  - Mayor (2016–): Cornel-Vasile Gui (PNL)
- Area: 89.99 km^{2} (34.75 sq mi)
- Population (2021-12-01): 3,603
  - Density: 40.04/km^{2} (103.7/sq mi)
- Time zone: UTC+02:00 (EET)
  - Summer (DST): UTC+03:00 (EEST)
- Postal code: 307405–307407
- Vehicle reg.: TM
- Website: www.primariateremiamare.ro

Teremia Mare (German: Marienfeld or Großtermin; Hungarian: Máriafölde or Nagyteremia; Serbian: Велика Теремија, romanized: Velika Teremija) is a commune in Timiș County, Romania. It is composed of three villages: Nerău, Teremia Mare (commune seat) and Teremia Mică.

== Geography ==
Teremia Mare is located in the southwest of the Mureș Plain, on the border with Serbia.

The area has a temperate continental climate with slight Mediterranean influences, featuring an annual average temperature of 10.8°C and a multi-year average precipitation of 536.3 mm. Winters are generally mild, summers are moderately warm, and both spring and autumn tend to be longer seasons.

The dominant vegetation is grassy. The arboreal vegetation is characterized by the presence of black locust, mulberry and poplar, and the shrub vegetation by blackthorn and hawthorn.

The local fauna includes species well-adapted to the area, such as the field mouse, polecat, steppe ferret, and hare. Among the bird species commonly found are the skylark, quail, partridge, pheasant, starling, and woodcock. The region also hosts a high population of locusts, crickets, and various other insects.

== History ==
The first recorded mention of Teremia Mare dates from 1256, under the name of Teremteluk. Between 1769 and 1770, the locality was re-established by colonization with Germans (Swabians) from Alsace and Württemberg. It formed a common colony with Teremia Mică, Comloș and Tomnatic. The Catholic church and the school were built in 1770. The Germans called the village Marienfeld or Großteremin. In 1785 it was bought by Cristofor Nakó, and in 1835 it became the property of Ioan Nakó.

In the interwar period it was part of Plasa Comloșu Mare, Timiș-Torontal County and was a German locality, with very few Romanians and Hungarians. After World War II, the Germans began to leave the locality. Gradually, the Romanians take their place. Immediately after the 1989 revolution, the mass exodus of the Germans took place, so that Teremia Mare became a majority Romanian locality.

== Demographics ==
Ethnic composition (2021)
1. Romanians (85.3%)
2. Hungarians (3.13%)
3. Roma (1.24%)
4. Unknown (9.63%)
5. Others (0.69%)
Religious composition (2011)
1. Orthodox (72.3%)
2. Pentecostals (8.43%)
3. Roman Catholics (5.35%)
4. Baptists (1.08%)
5. Unknown (10.2%)
6. Others (2.17%)
7. Irreligious, atheists and agnostics (0.52%)

Teremia Mare had a population of 3,603 inhabitants at the 2021 census, down 10.35% from the 2011 census. Most inhabitants are Romanians (85.31%), larger minorities being represented by Hungarians (3.13%) and Roma (1.24%). For 9.63% of the population, ethnicity is unknown. By religion, most inhabitants are Orthodox (72.3%), but there are also minorities of Pentecostals (8.43%), Roman Catholics (5.35%) and Baptists (1.08%). For 10.15% of the population, religious affiliation is unknown.

Census		Ethnic composition
Year	Population	Romanians	Hungarians	Germans	Roma	Bulgarians
1880	5,153	943	39	4,152	–	–
1890	5,715	966	101	4,610	–	–
1900	5,322	1,031	72	4,178	–	–
1910	5,497	973	204	4,253	–	–
1920	5,831	1,039	130	4,606	–	–
1930	5,710	1,075	147	4,398	56	6
1941	6,258	1,550	264	4,318	–	–
1956	5,470	1,999	352	2,937	115	52
1966	5,434	2,282	310	2,673	62	87
1977	4,544	2,265	296	1,842	109	20
1992	3,871	3,208	330	172	105	18
2002	4,148	3,652	280	78	105	7
2011	4,019	3,458	177	40	66	4
2021	3,603	3,074	113	14	45	–

== Politics and administration ==
The commune of Teremia Mare is administered by a mayor and a local council composed of 13 councilors. The mayor, Cornel-Vasile Gui, from the National Liberal Party, has been in office since 2016. As from the 2024 local elections, the local council has the following composition by political parties:

Party	Seats	Composition
National Liberal Party	8	
Social Democratic Party	3	
Ind.	1	
Alliance for the Union of Romanians	1	

== Education ==
The commune of Teremia Mare has two general schools serving grades I–VIII, located in Teremia Mare and Nerău, respectively. Additionally, each of the commune's three localities has a primary school for grades I–IV, as well as a kindergarten.

== Healthcare ==
Medical services in the commune are offered through four private clinics: one dental office and three general medical practices, all located in Teremia Mare. These clinics also extend their services to the neighboring villages of Nerău and Teremia Mică via a satellite point. In 2005, a pharmacy was established in the commune to meet the population's basic emergency needs.

== Economy ==
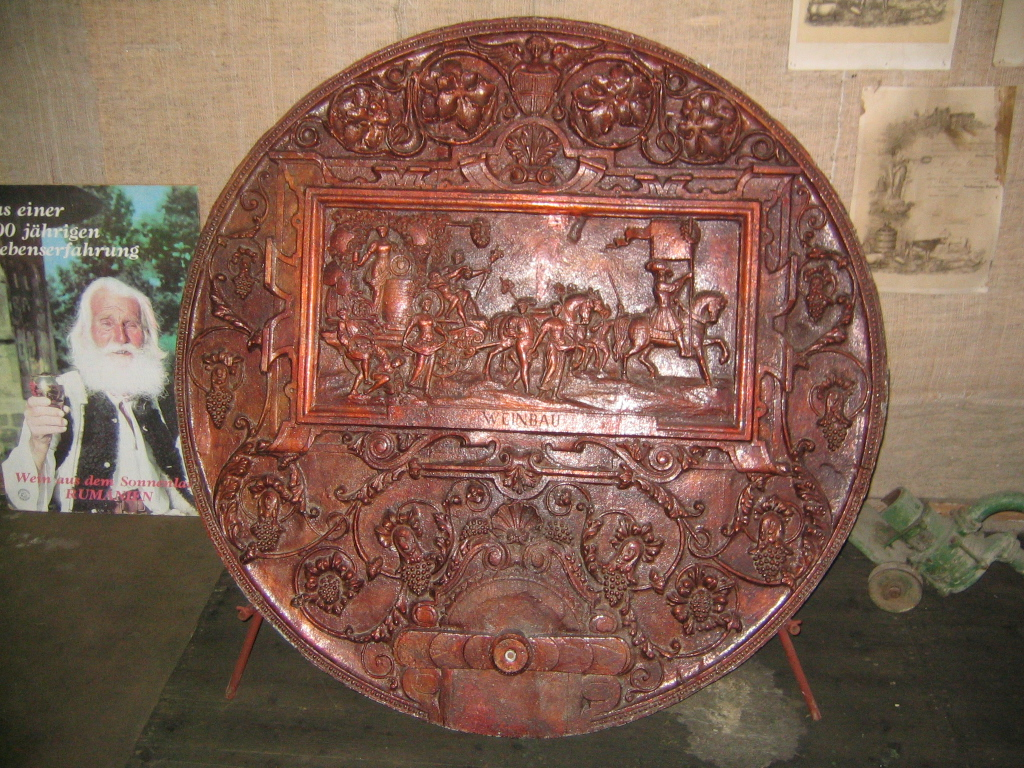
Typical Swabian barrel lid, adorned with wine motifs, on display at the Wine Museum in Teremia Mare

Teremia Mare is a winegrowing community and is known for its high-quality red wine and brandy, the Marienfelder Cognac. Viticulture and winemaking are the most important industries in Teremia Mare. However, growing cereals and vegetables are also of economic importance.

Teremia Mare also became known for the healing thermal water, which is mainly used for rheumatic diseases. The thermal bath was built after a thermal spring was found in 1972 while searching for oil.

== Infrastructure ==
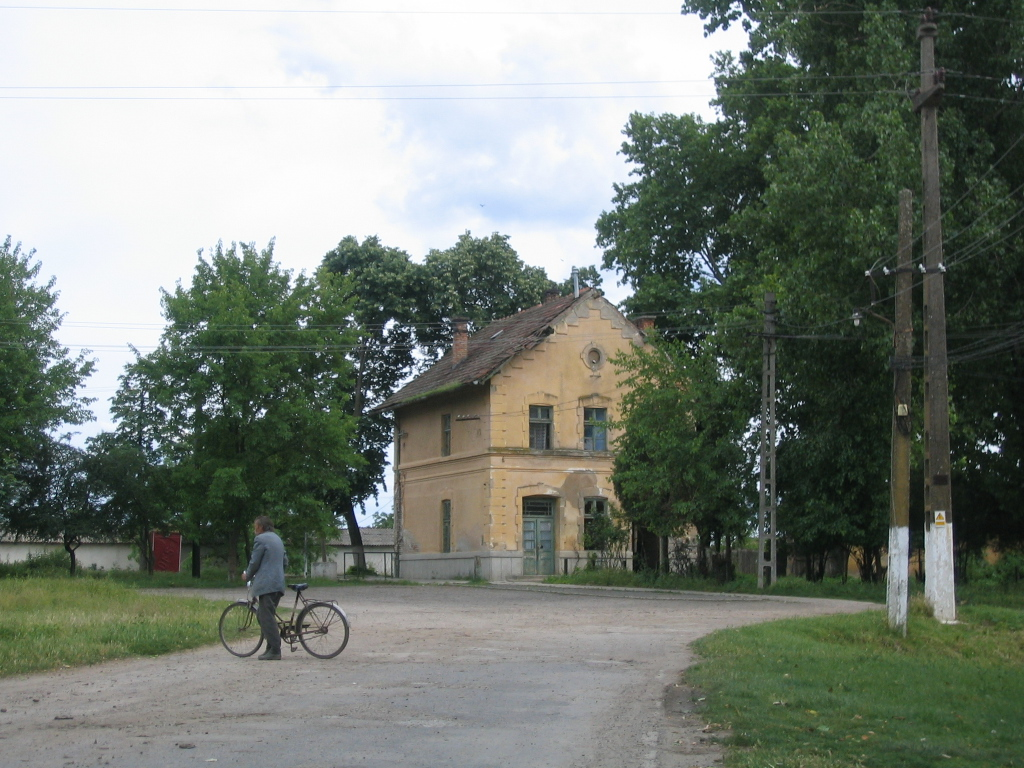
Teremia Mare train station

The commune is traversed by the national road DN59C, providing connections to the towns of Sânnicolau Mare (17 km to the north) and Jimbolia (24 km to the east). It is also accessible by rail, with its own station located on the Timișoara–Nerău line.

== Notable people ==
- Hansi Schmidt (1942–2023), handball player
