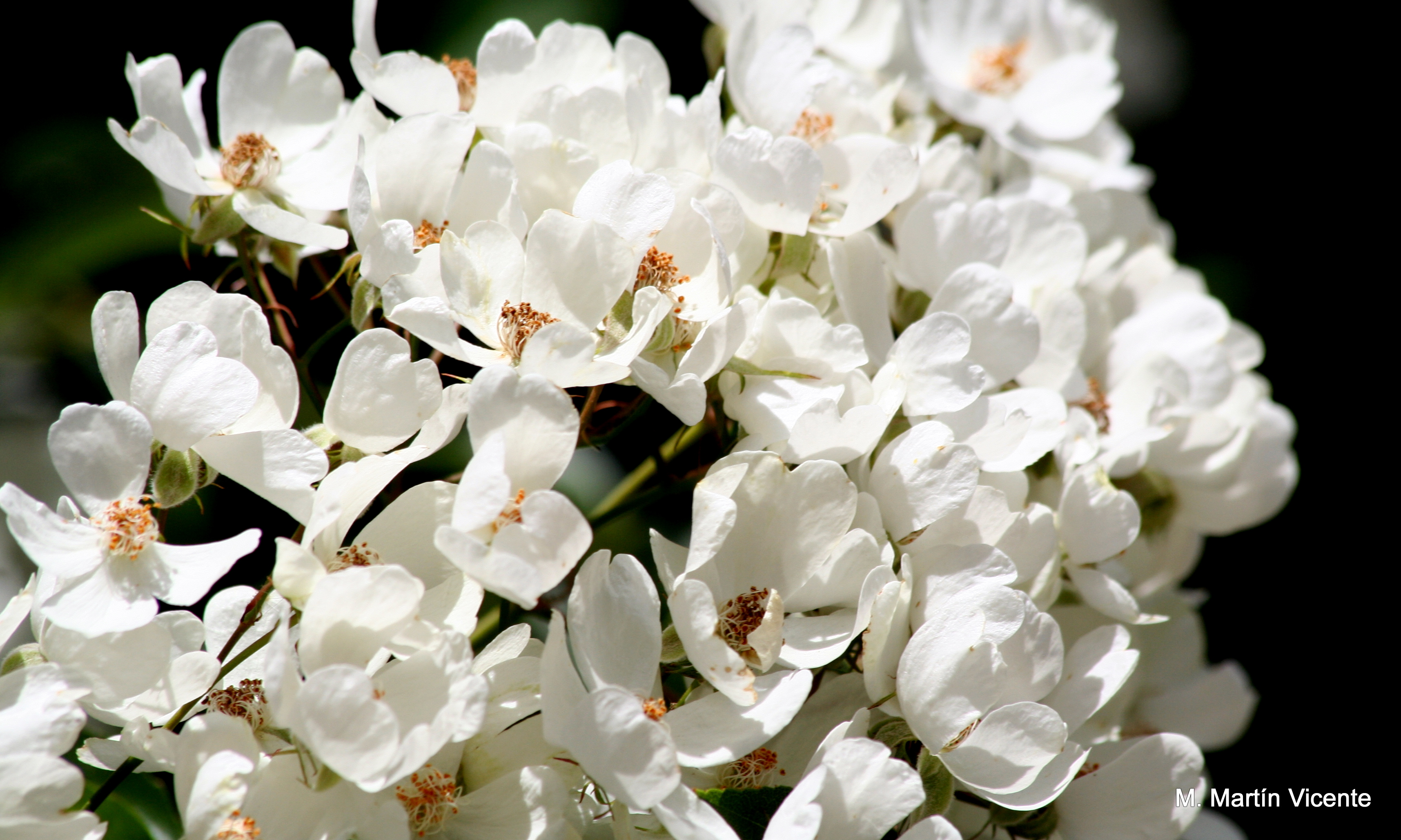
- Rosa cymosa var. cymosa

Scientific classification
- Kingdom: Plantae
- Clade: Tracheophytes
- Clade: Angiosperms
- Clade: Eudicots
- Clade: Rosids
- Order: Rosales
- Family: Rosaceae
- Genus: Rosa
- Species: R. cymosa

Binomial name
- Rosa cymosa Tratt.

Synonyms
- Rosa amoyensis Hance; Rosa bodinieri H.L‚v. & Vaniot; Rosa cavaleriei H.L‚v.; Rosa chaffanjonii H.L‚v. & Vaniot; Rosa esquirolii H.L‚v. & Vaniot; Rosa fragariiflora Ser.; Rosa fragariifolia Ser. ex Steud. [Spelling variant]; Rosa indica L. (1753); Rosa microcarpa Lindl.; Rosa patrum H.L‚v. ex Rehder; Rosa sorbiflora Focke; Rosa sorbifolia Anon. [Spelling variant]

= Rosa cymosa =

Species of flowering plant

Rosa cymosa is a species of climbing rose native to China, where it grows from the east coast in Fujian to western Sichuan at up to 1300 m, in warm areas in scrub and gorges, and in bamboo plantations. It is sometimes called the elderflower rose as its flower formation resembles elderberry (Sambucus) flowers.

Rosa cymosa has long smooth or hairy stems to 5 m, with a few, hooked thorns. Shoots and leaves are bright red when young. The leaflets are narrowly lanceolate, rounded at the base, and acuminate with a slender, curved point. Stipules are narrow and not attached to the stalk, or soon falling. The pedicels are slender. Flowers small and numerous, in a compound umbel or corymb, creamy-white, 1–1.5 cm across. The hips very small and round, around 5 mm across, and are dull or scarlet-red in color with many small seeds.

Rather tender, probably best grown in a greenhouse or conservatory in frosty climates. Flowers in late May and early June.
