= Cărbunești =

- Commune
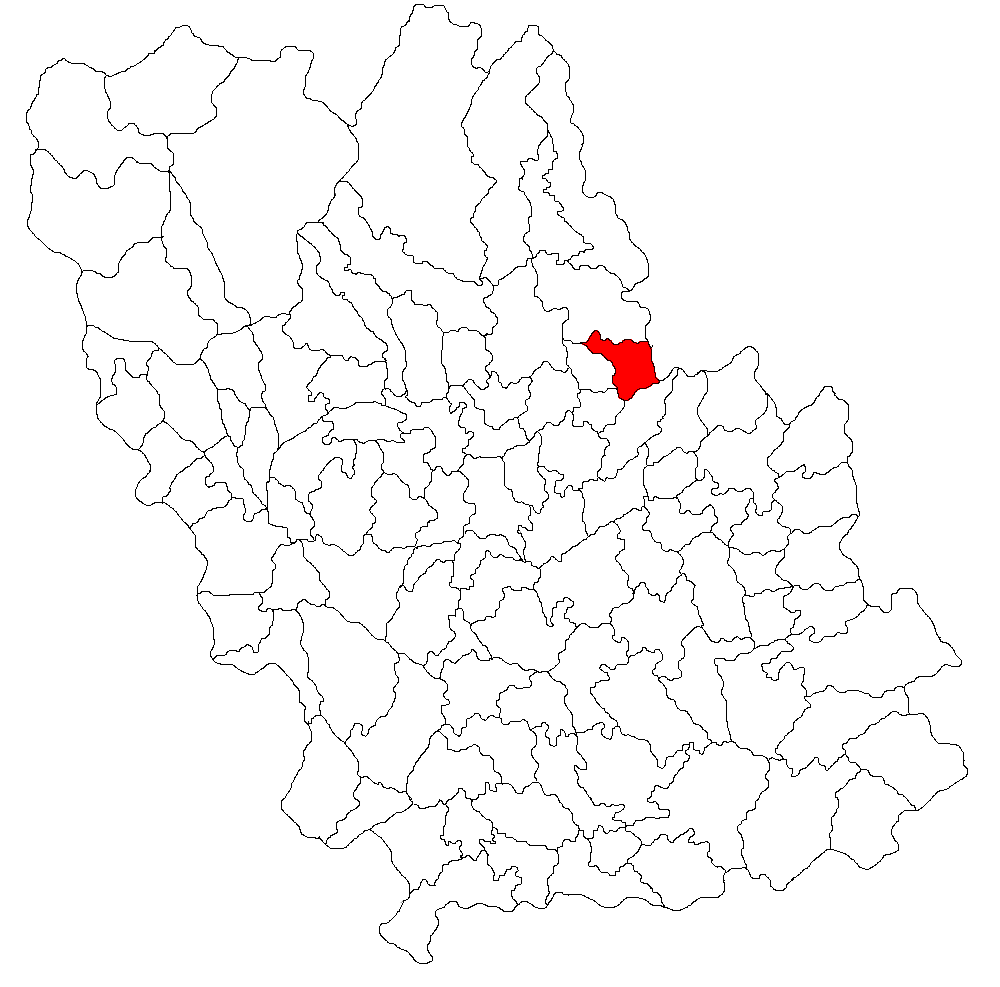
- Location in Prahova County

- Location in Romania
- Coordinates: 45°14′N 26°12′E
- Country: Romania
- County: Prahova

Government
  - Mayor (2024–2028): Petre Stan (PNL)
- Area: 20.2 km^{2} (7.8 sq mi)
- Elevation: 303 m (994 ft)
- Population (2021-12-01): 1,450
  - Density: 72/km^{2} (190/sq mi)
- Time zone: EET/EEST (UTC+2/+3)
- Postal code: 107120
- Area code: +(40) 244
- Vehicle reg.: PH
- Website: primaria-carbunesti.ro

Cărbunești is a commune in Prahova County, Muntenia, Romania. It is composed of two villages, Cărbunești and Gogeasca.

Historical population
Year	Pop.	±%
1992	2,033	—
2002	1,920	−5.6%
2011	1,642	−14.5%
2021	1,450	−11.7%
Source: Census data
