= Chinezu =

Chinezu is a Romanian surname that may refer to:

- Ion Chinezu (1894–1966), an Austro-Hungarian-born Romanian literary critic and translator
- Tit Liviu Chinezu (1904–1955), a Romanian bishop of the Greek-Catholic Church
- Pál Kinizsi (1432–1494), a Hungarian general called "Paul Chinezu" in Romanian
