= Lovrin =

- Commune
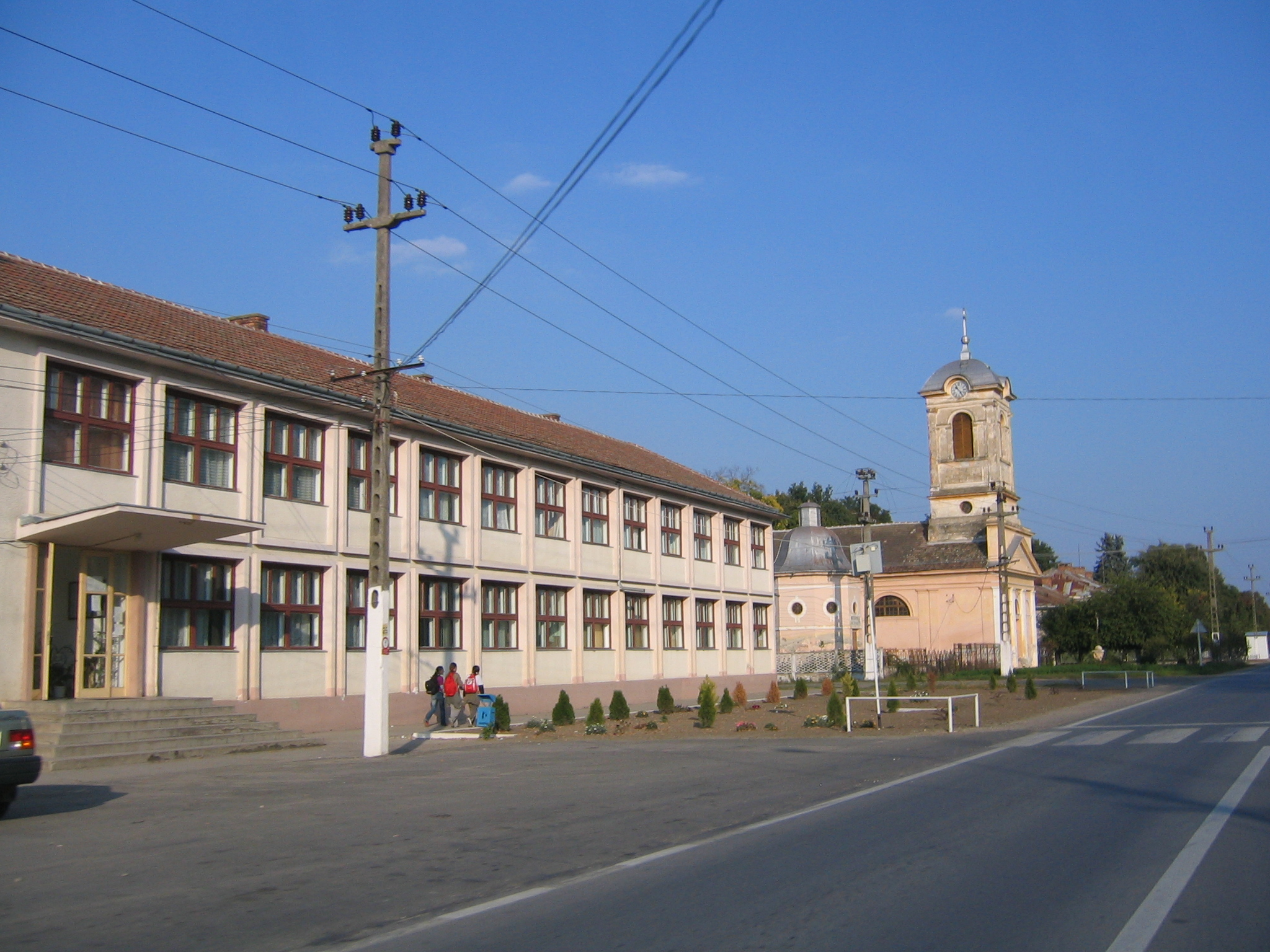
- The high school and the Roman Catholic church in Lovrin

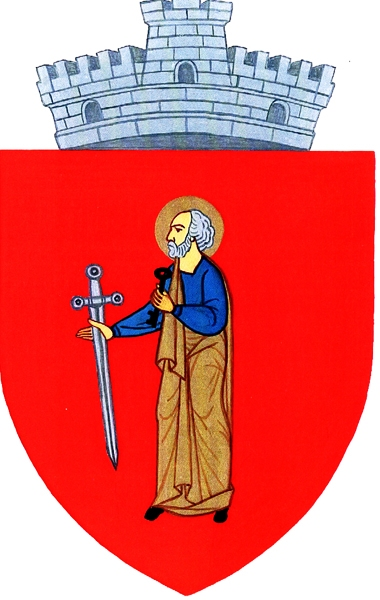
- Coat of arms

- Location in Timiș County

- Location in Romania
- Coordinates: 45°58′N 20°46′E
- Country: Romania
- County: Timiș

Government
  - Mayor (2004–): Vasile Graur (PNL)
- Area: 43.37 km^{2} (16.75 sq mi)
- Elevation: 90 m (300 ft)
- Population (2021-12-01): 2,866
  - Density: 66.08/km^{2} (171.2/sq mi)
- Time zone: UTC+02:00 (EET)
  - Summer (DST): UTC+03:00 (EEST)
- Postal code: 307250
- Area code: (+40) 02 56
- Vehicle reg.: TM
- Website: primaria-lovrin.ro

Lovrin (German: Lowring, formerly Lorandhausen; Hungarian: Lovrin, formerly Lóránthalma; Serbian: Ловрин, romanized: Lovrin) is a commune in Timiș County, Romania. It is composed of a single village, Lovrin. It also included three other villages – Gottlob, Tomnatic, and Vizejdia – until 2004, when they were split off to form Gottlob and Tomnatic communes.

The commune itself is a significant railway junction served by local railway lines radiating in five directions. It is an agro-industrial and urban center for the surrounding region. Until the early 1990s, the majority of inhabitants were of German descent, but emigration has significantly reduced their numbers.

== History ==
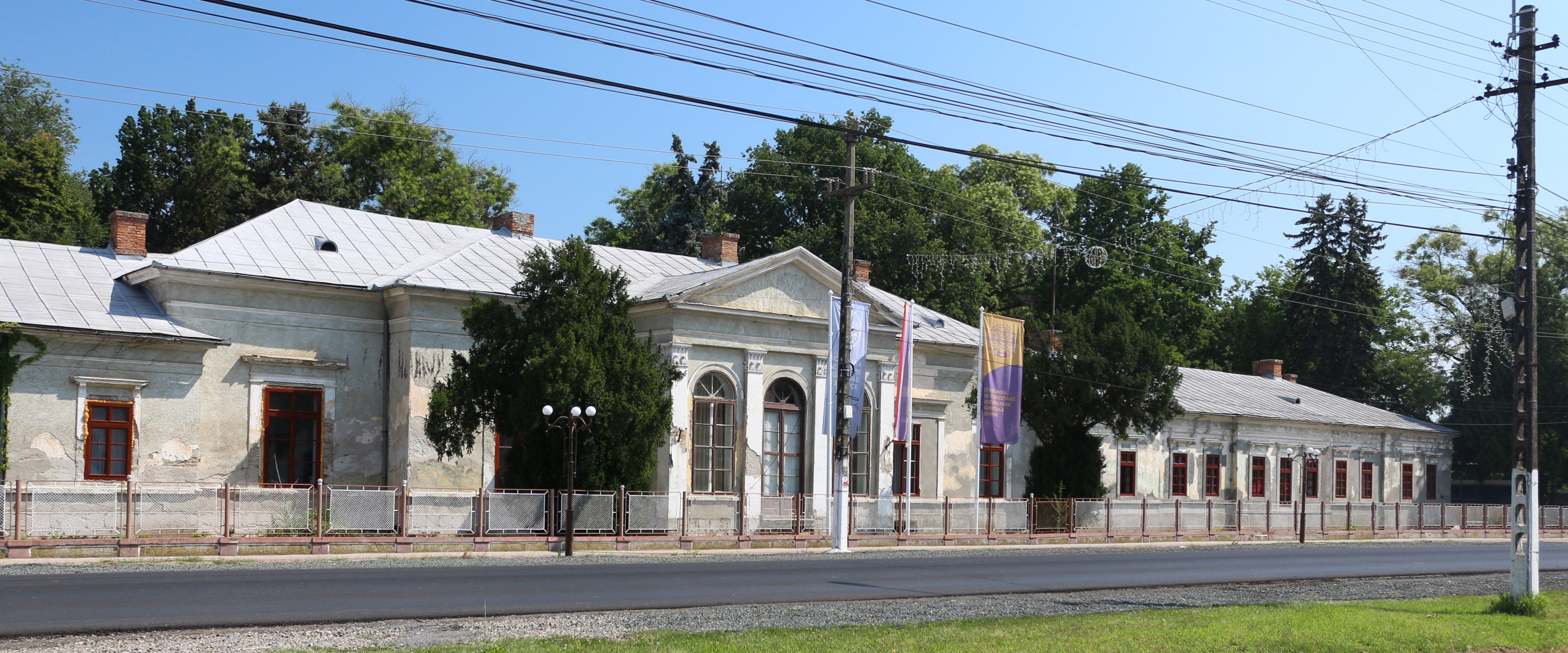
Lipthay Mansion, now an agricultural research station

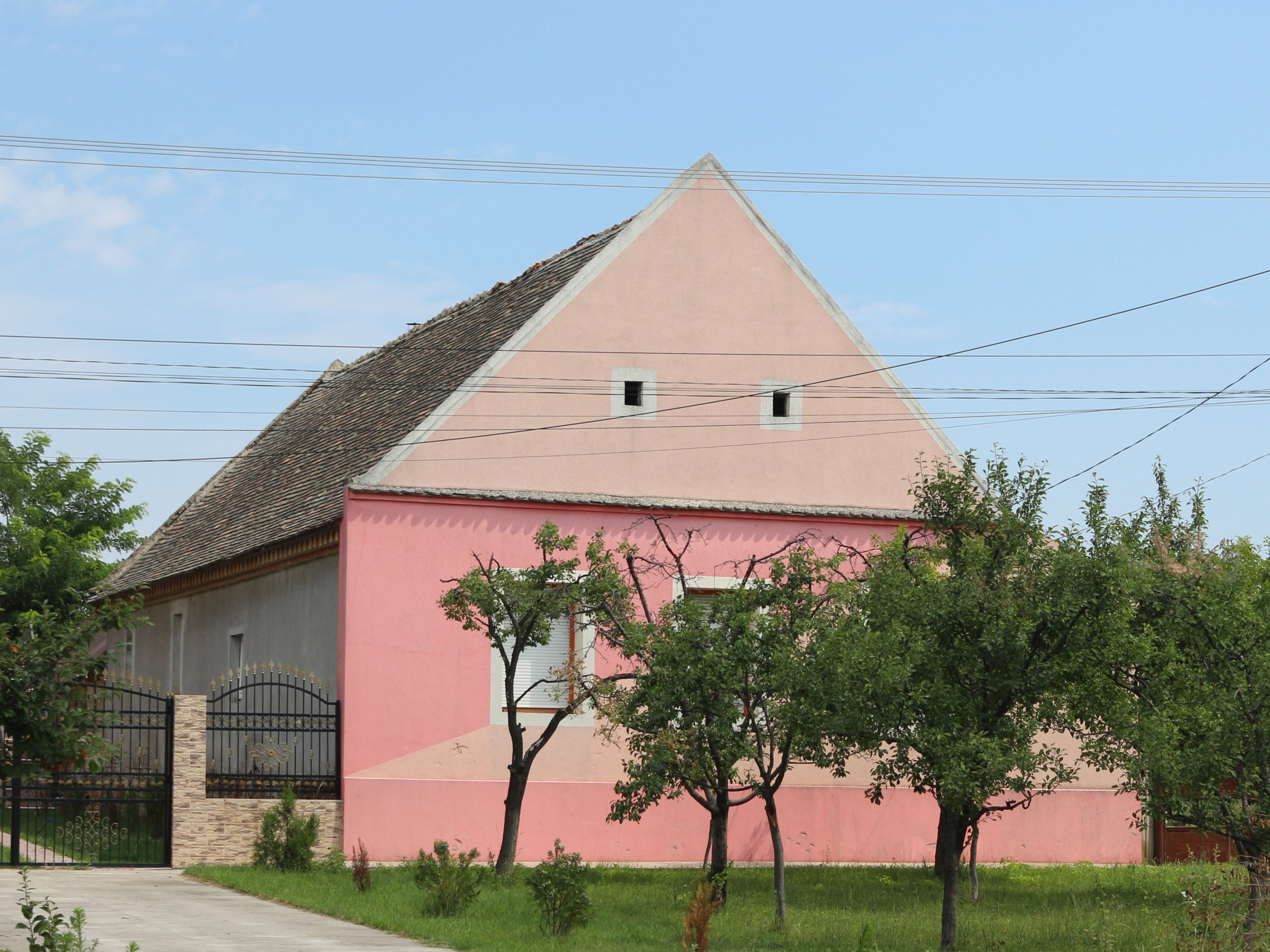
Typical Swabian house built in 1906

Lovrin was documented in 1466 as Lóránthalma. Later it was also known as Lóránt or Lórántfalva. In 1529 it was looted by the Turks, which led to the refuge of the population for a while. In 1564 the village is recorded as private property of the bishop of Cenad. It began to be repopulated and was inhabited by Serbs who were still living here in 1582. A period of decline followed again, with the settlement almost deserted. The repopulation took place only after 1760. At that time Lovrin was part of the Nagykikinda District and was subject to the military administration that had been established in Banat after the expulsion of the Turks in 1717. Bulgarian settlers first came here, who changed its name to Lovrinac.

Between 1785–1792, the first German colonizations are recorded, with Swabians brought from Cenad and other Banat localities. They have received numerous privileges to indigenous peoples, which is why communities of Serbs and Bulgarians were forced to leave. In 1792, Lovrin, along with Gottlob, were gifted by Emperor Leopold II to General Anton Lipthay, for special merits in the battles against the Turks. General Lipthay built a mansion here that still bears his name today.

Lovrin experienced an industrial boom in the 19th century, several small factories opening here. Some of them include the brewery (1846–1870), the iron foundry (1924–1944) and the dressing factory. Between 1940 and 1944, canned vegetables were fabricated for the Wehrmacht; the factory was closed immediately after 1944. The German majority remained until the agrarian reform of 1945. Between 1951 and 1956, 434 people were deported from Lovrin to the Bărăgan Plain. After 1989–1991, most of the remaining Germans emigrated, their place being taken by the Romanian population.

== Demographics ==
Ethnic composition (2021)
1. Romanians (77.7%)
2. Roma (1.81%)
3. Germans (1.15%)
4. Unknown (18.0%)
5. Others (1.38%)
Religious composition (2021)
1. Orthodox (66.5%)
2. Pentecostals (7.92%)
3. Roman Catholics (5.93%)
4. Unknown (18.7%)
5. Others (0.65%)
6. Irreligious, atheists and agnostics (0.27%)

Lovrin had a population of 2,866 inhabitants at the 2021 census, down 11.07% from the 2011 census. Most inhabitants are Romanians (77.7%), larger minorities being represented by Roma (1.81%) and Germans (1.15%). For 17.96% of the population, ethnicity is unknown. By religion, most inhabitants are Orthodox (66.53%), but there are also minorities of Pentecostals (7.92%) and Roman Catholics (5.93%). For 18.7% of the population, religious affiliation is unknown.

Census		Ethnic composition
Year	Population	Romanians	Hungarians	Germans	Roma	Serbs	Slovaks	Bulgarians
1880	3,820	105	60	3,606	–	22	–	–
1890	3,798	164	45	3,542	–	21	5	–
1900	4,012	217	104	3,654	–	25	–	–
1910	3,881	217	182	3,450	–	28	1	–
1920	3,913	193	78	3,562	–	–	–	–
1930	3,801	234	138	3,302	43	38	44	–
1941	3,681	426	144	3,013	–	–	–	–
1956	3,672	–	–	–	–	–	–	–
1966	4,069	2,097	150	1,692	28	46	26	22
1977	4,255	2,618	130	1,367	46	41	21	11
1992	3,562	3,018	108	285	82	20	8	16
2002	3,560	3,243	71	120	80	14	6	13
2011	3,223	2,849	41	76	110	7	–	13
2021	2,866	2,227	28	33	52	–	–	5

== Politics and administration ==
The commune of Lovrin is administered by a mayor and a local council composed of 13 councilors. The mayor, Vasile Graur, from the National Liberal Party, has been in office since 2004. As from the 2024 local elections, the local council has the following composition by political parties:

Party	Seats	Composition
National Liberal Party	9	
Social Democratic Party	2	
Alliance for the Union of Romanians	1	
Save Romania Union	1	

== Notable people ==
- Josef Eisenkolb (1821–1899), composer
- Kaspar Eisenkolb (1826–1913), composer
- Jakob Hillier (1848–1918), church musician
- Aurel Eisenkolb (1849–1918), composer
- Kaspar Muth (1876–1966), politician
- Anton Peter Petri (1923–1995), historian
- Edda Buding (1936–2014), tennis player
- Annemarie Podlipny-Hehn (b. 1938), art historian and writer
- Ilse Buding (1939–2023), tennis player
- Ingo Buding (1942–2003), tennis player
- Ilse Hehn (b. 1943), writer and visual artist
- Richard Wagner (1952–2023), novelist
- Paul Pauli (b. 1960), psychologist
- Ioan Almășan (b. 1962), football goalkeeper
