= Tomnatic =

- Commune
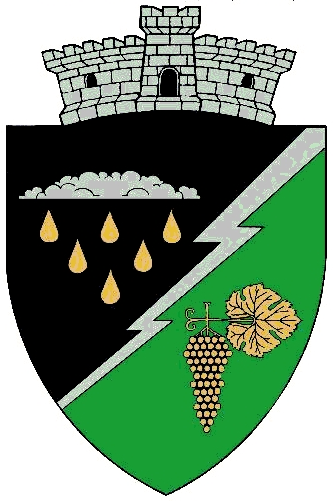
- Coat of arms

- Location in Timiș County

- Location in Romania
- Coordinates: 45°59′N 20°39′E
- Country: Romania
- County: Timiș

Government
  - Mayor (2012–): Stoian Vasiu (PSD)
- Area: 35.38 km^{2} (13.66 sq mi)
- Population (2021-12-01): 3,106
  - Density: 87.79/km^{2} (227.4/sq mi)
- Time zone: EET/EEST (UTC+2/+3)
- Postal code: 307255
- Vehicle reg.: TM
- Website: www.primariatomnatic.ro

Tomnatic (German: Triebswetter; Hungarian: Nagyősz) is a commune in Timiș County, Romania. It is composed of a single village, Tomnatic. It was part of Lovrin commune until 2004, when it was split off.

== Etymology ==
The name is the Romanian translation of the German Triebswetter ("fall weather"). This was the name of the village until the union of Banat with Romania. Through Romanianization, it was changed to Tomnatic. In some cases, the form Tomnatec was also used.

== History ==
Near Tomnatic took place the last battle between Ahtum, the leader of Romanians, Pechenegs and Bulgars in the rough territory of today's Banat, and the Hungarian invaders led by Chanadinus, a rebellious general of Ahtum, in 1003 or 1030 (the date of the battle is disputed).

Tomnatic first appears in written history in 1000. By 1451, it is mentioned under the name of Naghiuz ("Uzul Mare"), probably with reference to the Cuman population (Udi), who remained for a long time on the territory of the historical Banat. It was inhabited until the end of the Ottoman period, because Marsigli, in 1690–1700, mentions the Nagyeösz estate. With the reconquest of Banat from the Turks in 1716, the colonization of the region began. In 1772, at Tomnatic were settled colonists from the Alsace–Lorraine area, mostly French. 62% of the first settlers came from the Château-Salins area of France (on the border with Germany), 8% from Luxembourg, 5% from Baden, 5% from Bavaria and the rest from other parts of Germany. 200 houses were originally built, according to the plans of engineer Antonius von Triebswetter. The name of the new Franco-German village was given in his honor: Triebswetter.

Tomnatic was for a long time the largest "French" village in Banat. The Germans were located in the southern part of the village on the so-called Deutschgasse (German street), and the French lived in the rest of the village. In time there was an assimilation of the French by the Germans, other French left Tomnatic for other French colonies in the Serbian Banat. The last person to speak only French was recorded in 1890. Some words of French origin have been preserved in the local vocabulary and the names of some families are reminiscent of the French origins of the inhabitants: Bailly, Bourgeau, Boquel, Frecôt, Tirier, etc.

The local church was built between 1846 and 1850. The then bishop of Banat, French-born Alexander Bonnaz, equipped the church with a high altar and two side altars.

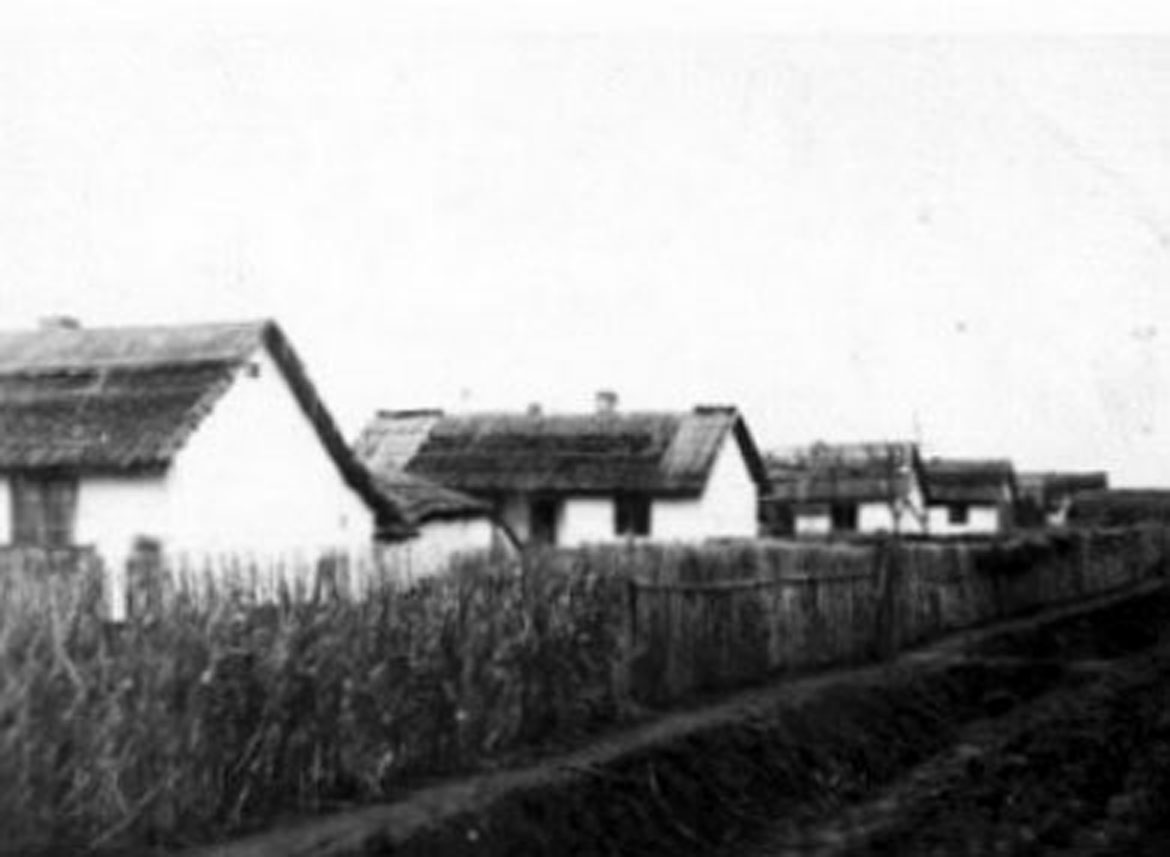
During the Bărăgan deportations, most people from Tomnatic were settled in Giurgenii Noi, later called Răchitoasa, in Ialomița County.

During the Hungarian administration, it was called Nagyösz, and after 1920 it took its current Romanian name. Just before the end of World War II, in January 1945, all ethnic German women between the ages of 18 and 30 and men between the ages of 16 and 45 were deported to the Soviet Union for reconstruction works. Subsequently, 1,002 people from Tomnatic (almost a quarter of the population) were deported to the Bărăgan steppe, irrespective of ethnicity.

== Demographics ==
Ethnic composition (2021)
1. Romanians (77.3%)
2. Roma (8.01%)
3. Germans (3.89%)
4. Hungarians (2.25%)
5. Unknown (7.30%)
6. Others (1.22%)
Religious composition (2021)
1. Orthodox (67.5%)
2. Roman Catholics (15.4%)
3. Pentecostals (7.59%)
4. Unknown (7.50%)
5. Others (1.63%)
6. Irreligious, atheists and agnostics (0.35%)

Tomnatic had a population of 3,106 inhabitants at the 2021 census, down 1.21% from the 2011 census. Most inhabitants are Romanians (77.33%), larger minorities being represented by Roma (8.01%), Germans (3.89%) and Hungarians (2.25%). For 7.3% of the population, ethnicity is unknown. By religion, most inhabitants are Orthodox (67.48%), but there are also minorities of Roman Catholics (15.45%) and Pentecostals (7.59%). For 7.5% of the population, religious affiliation is unknown.

Census		Ethnic composition
Year	Population	Romanians	Hungarians	Germans	Roma	Ukrainians	Serbs	Bulgarians
1880	3,428	29	9	3,363	–	–	1	–
1890	3,659	32	17	3,560	–	–	11	–
1900	3,435	41	60	3,319	–	–	12	–
1910	3,622	55	56	3,378	51	–	68	–
1920	3,438	24	17	3,352	–	–	–	–
1930	3,296	144	102	2,748	78	–	17	4
1941	3,364	266	170	2,743	–	–	–	–
1956	3,501	–	–	–	–	–	–	–
1966	3,459	1,253	180	1,819	79	4	4	91
1977	3,585	1,673	194	1,454	169	15	5	61
1992	2,927	1,987	165	383	277	76	4	32
2002	3,088	2,429	144	154	260	75	7	18
2011	3,144	2,466	125	122	213	45	9	19
2021	3,106	2,402	70	121	249	19	6	8

== Politics and administration ==
The commune of Tomnatic is administered by a mayor and a local council composed of 12 councilors. The mayor, Stoian Vasiu, from the Social Democratic Party, has been in office since 2012. As from the 2024 local elections, the local council has the following composition by political parties:

Party	Seats	Composition
Social Democratic Party	10	
Save Romania Union–People's Movement Party–Force of the Right	2	

== Economy ==
The local economy is based on agriculture, the inhabitants being specialized in growing vegetables. In the past, the village was known for its vineyards and orchards. After the installation of communism, agriculture took the form of vegetable farming on a large scale. Tomnatic was in the past the largest paprika production center in Banat. Today, paprika cultivation is practiced on a much smaller scale.

Year	No. of active companies	No. of employees	Evolution of total turnover
2005	32	186	RON 13.37 million
2007	44	209	RON 26.58 million
2009	41	127	RON 16.08 million
2011	43	149	RON 30.51 million
2013	47	128	RON 23.61 million
2015	50	114	RON 32.32 million
2017	50	118	RON 35.93 million
2019	56	112	RON 39.05 million
2021	64	96	RON 64.23 million

== Notable people ==
- Rudolf Schati (1913–1984), actor, director and founding member of the German State Theater in Timișoara
- Anton Palfi (b. 1946), journalist, poet and translator
- Franz Thomas Schleich (b. 1948), writer and publicist
