= Arad railway station =

Railway station in Arad, Romania

Arad
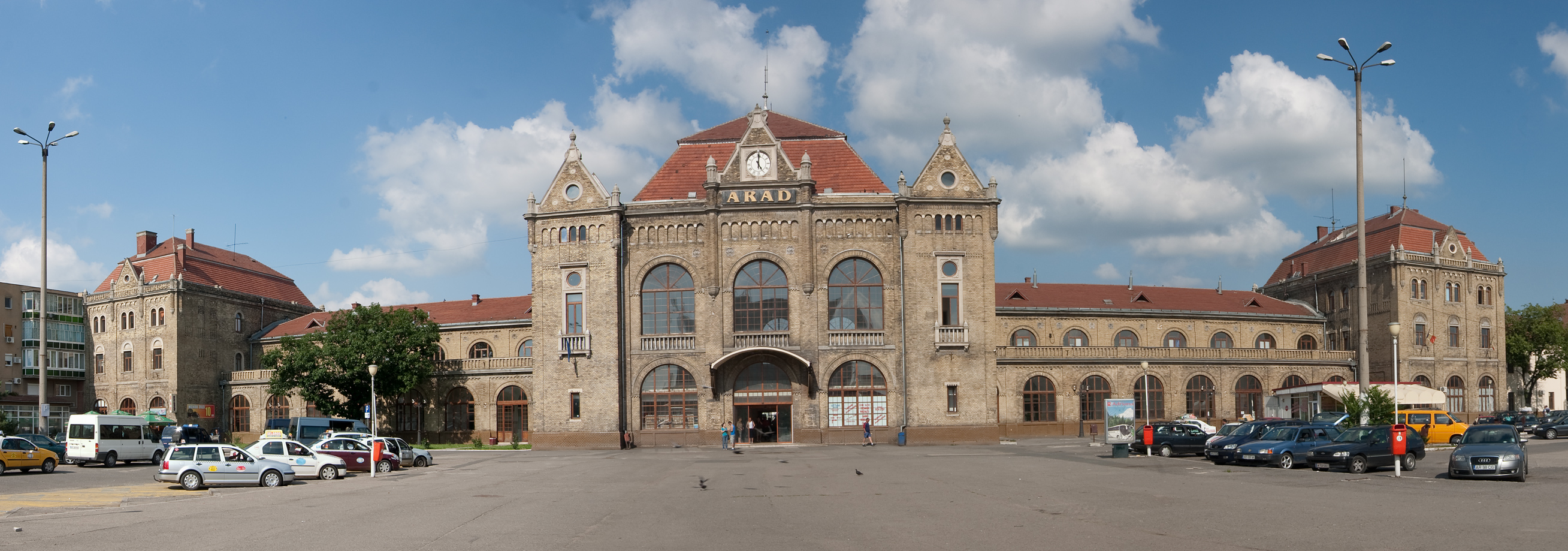
- View of the station building

General information
- Location: Piaṭa Gării, Nr. 8-9, Arad, Romania
- Coordinates: 46°11′22.5276″N 21°19′29.5356″E
- Owner: CFR
- Lines: 200 Arad–București; 215 Arad–Nădlac; 216 Arad–Vălcani; 310 Oradea–Arad–Timișoara Nord; 317 Arad–Ineu–Brad
- Platforms: 3 straight
- Tracks: 7

Construction
- Platform levels: 1
- Parking: yes
- Cycle facilities: yes

History
- Opened: 25 October 1858
- Electrified: 15 September 1975

Services
Preceding station	CFR	Following station
Terminus	CFR Intercity 200	Deva towards București Nord
Location

Arad railway station (Romanian: Gara Arad) is the largest railway station in the city of Arad, and the largest in Arad County. It is the second largest railway station in the western region of Romania, immediately after Timișoara Nord railway station.

== History ==
The main building was designed by Hungarian architect Ferenc Pfaff, when Arad was a major city of the Austro-Hungarian Empire.

== Operators ==
The station is managed by the infrastructure operator Compania Națională de Căi Ferate CFR, which owns the station building and infrastructure, and served by trains of the state-owned operator and multiple private operators.

Train services mostly run on the CFR 200 Main Line from Brașov/Bucureṣti Nord to Curtici. The Arad–Curtici line is the main railway link to Western Europe toward Budapest Keleti.

=== ICN/IC services ===
Series	Train Type	Internal Route	External Route	Frequency	Notes
346; Dacia	ICN	București Nord–Ploiești Vest–Cîmpina–Sinaia–Predeal–Brașov–Sighișoara–Mediaș–Blaj–Alba Iulia–Simeria–Deva–Arad–Curtici	Lőkösháza–Békéscsaba–Szolnok–Budapest-Keleti pu.–Budapest-Kelenföld–Tatabánya–Győr–Mosonmagyaróvár–Hegyeshalom–Wien Westbahnhof	1x per day	Classified as EN346 outside of Romania.
347; Dacia	ICN	Curtici–Arad–Deva–Simeria–Alba Iulia–Blaj–Mediaș–Sighișoara–Brașov–Predeal–Sinaia–Cîmpina–Ploiești Vest–București Nord	Wien Westbahnhof–Hegyeshalom–Mosonmagyaróvár–Győr–Tatabánya–Budapest-Kelenföld–Budapest-Keleti pu.–Szolnok–Békéscsaba–Lőkösháza	1x per day	Classified as EN347 outside of Romania.
472; Ister	ICN	București Nord–Ploiești Vest–Cîmpina–Sinaia–Predeal–Brașov–Sighișoara–Mediaș–Blaj–Alba Iulia–Simeria–Deva–Arad–Curtici	Lőkösháza–Békéscsaba–Szolnok–Budapest-Keleti pu.	1x per day	Classified as EN472 outside of Romania.
473; Ister	ICN	Curtici–Arad–Deva–Simeria–Alba Iulia–Blaj–Mediaș–Sighișoara–Brașov–Predeal–Sinaia–Cîmpina–Ploiești Vest–București Nord	Budapest-Keleti pu.–Szolnok–Békéscsaba–Lőkösháza	1x per day	Classified as EN473 outside of Romania.
521 "Aurel Vlaicu"	IC	Teiuș–Alba Iulia–Vințu de Jos–Simeria–Deva–Arad		1x per day	Forms from carriages from the IC 531 heading towards Oradea
522 "Aurel Vlaicu"	IC	Arad–Deva–Simeria–Vințu de Jos–Alba Iulia–Teiuș		1x per day	Leaves carriages for the IC 532 heading towards București Nord
534	IC	Timișoara Nord–Arad–Sântana–Chișineu-Criș–Salonta–Oradea–Aleșd– Ciucea–Huedin–Cluj-Napoca		1x per day	No Sunday service and from 22.05. to 26.06
535	IC	Cluj-Napoca–Huedin–Ciucea–Aleșd–Oradea–Salonta–Chișineu-Criș–Sântana–Arad–Timișoara Nord		1x per day	No weekend service
536	IC	Timișoara Nord–Arad–Sântana–Chișineu-Criș–Salonta–Oradea–Aleșd– Ciucea–Huedin–Cluj-Napoca		1x per day	No weekend service
537	IC	Cluj-Napoca–Huedin–Ciucea–Aleșd–Oradea–Salonta–Chișineu-Criș–Sântana–Arad–Timișoara Nord		1x per day	No Saturday service and from 21.05. to 25.06

=== International IR services ===
Series	Train Type	Route	Frequency	Notes
78; Criṣ	IR	Timișoara Nord–Arad–Curtici–Lőkösháza–Kétegyháza–Békéscsaba–Mezőberény–Gyoma–Mezőtúr–Szolnok–Budapest-Keleti pu.	1x per day	IC 78 Körös in Hungary
79; Criṣ	IR	Budapest-Keleti pu.–Szolnok–Mezőtúr–Gyoma–Mezőberény–Békéscsaba–Kétegyháza–Lőkösháza–Curtici–Arad–Timișoara Nord	1x per day	IC 79 Körös in Hungary
372; Transilvania	IR	Sibiu–Sebeș–Vințu de Jos–Arad–Curtici–Lőkösháza–Kétegyháza–Békéscsaba–Mezőberény–Gyoma–Mezőtúr–Szolnok–Budapest-Keleti pu.	1x per day	IC 372 Transsylvania in Hungary
373; Transilvania	IR	Budapest-Keleti pu.–Szolnok–Mezőtúr–Gyoma–Mezőberény–Békéscsaba–Kétegyháza–Lőkösháza–Curtici–Arad–Vințu de Jos–Sebeș–Sibiu	1x per day	IC 373 Transsylvania in Hungary
374; Pannonia	IR	Brașov–Sighișoara–Mediaș–Blaj–Alba Iulia–Simeria–Deva–Arad–Curtici–Lőkösháza–Kétegyháza–Békéscsaba–Mezőberény–Gyoma–Mezőtúr–Szolnok–Budapest-Keleti pu.	1x per day	IC 374 Pannonia in Hungary
375; Pannonia	IR	Budapest-Keleti pu.–Szolnok–Mezőtúr–Gyoma–Mezőberény–Békéscsaba–Kétegyháza–Lőkösháza–Curtici–Arad–Deva–Simeria–Alba Iulia–Blaj–Mediaș–Sighișoara–Brașov	1x per day	IC 375 Pannonia in Hungary
376; Mureș	IR	Târgu Mureș–Luduș–Războieni–Aiud–Teiuș–Alba Iulia–Vințu de Jos–Simeria–Deva–Arad–Curtici–Lőkösháza–Kétegyháza–Békéscsaba–Mezőberény–Gyoma–Mezőtúr–Szolnok–Budapest-Keleti pu.	1x per day	IC 376 Maros in Hungary
377; Mureș	IR	Budapest-Keleti pu.–Szolnok–Mezőtúr–Gyoma–Mezőberény–Békéscsaba–Kétegyháza–Lőkösháza–Curtici–Arad–Deva–Simeria–Alba Iulia–Teiuș–Aiud–Războieni–Luduș–Târgu Mureș	1x per day	IC 377 Maros in Hungary
1346; Muntenia	IR	București Nord–Ploiești Vest–Cîmpina–Sinaia–Predeal–Brașov–Sighișoara–Mediaș–Blaj–Alba Iulia–Simeria–Deva–Arad–Curtici–Lőkösháza–Kétegyháza–Békéscsaba–Mezőberény–Gyoma–Mezőtúr–Szolnok–Budapest-Keleti pu.	1x per day	
1347; Muntenia	IR	Budapest-Keleti pu.–Szolnok–Mezőtúr–Gyoma–Mezőberény–Békéscsaba–Kétegyháza–Lőkösháza–Curtici–Arad–Deva–Simeria–Alba Iulia–Blaj–Mediaș–Sighișoara–Brașov–Predeal–Sinaia–Cîmpina–Ploiești Vest–București Nord	1x per day	

== Lines ==
- Line 200 : Curtici–Arad–Deva–Vințu de Jos–Sibiu–Făgăraș–Brașov (to Bucharest it continues as the 1000 main line)
- Line 215 : Arad–Arad Vest–Pecica–Semlac–Șeitin–Nădlac
- Line 216 : Arad–Aradul Nou–Zădăreni–Bodrogul Nou–Felnac–Sânpetru German–Munar–Secusigiu–Aranca–Periam–Saravale–Sânnicolau Mare–Dudeștii Noi–Vălcani
- Line 310 : Timișoara–Arad–Sântana–Nădab–Ciumeghiu–Oradea
- Line 317 : Arad–Ineu–Gurahonţ–Brad

== Gallery ==
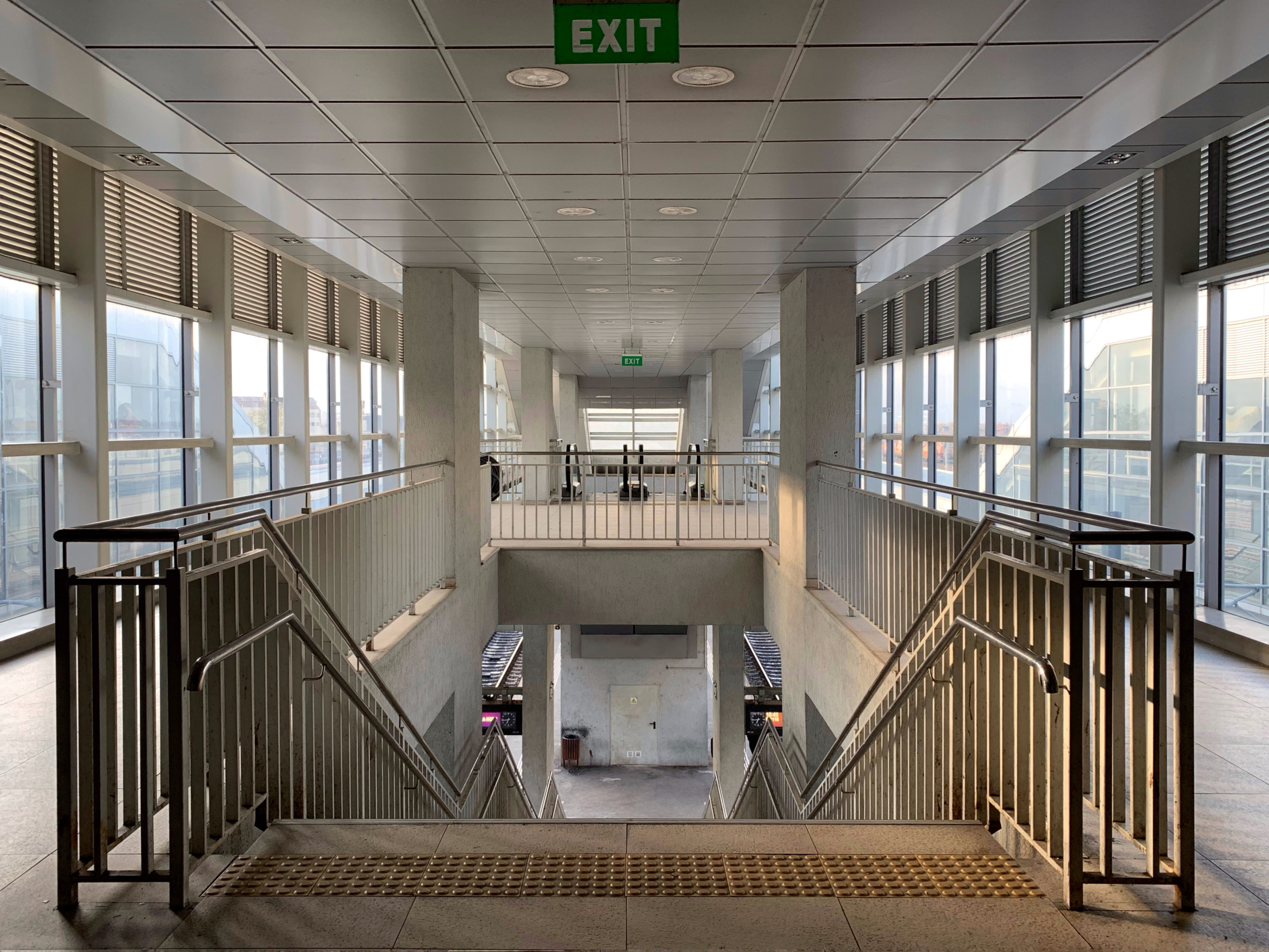
Stairs leading to the tracks

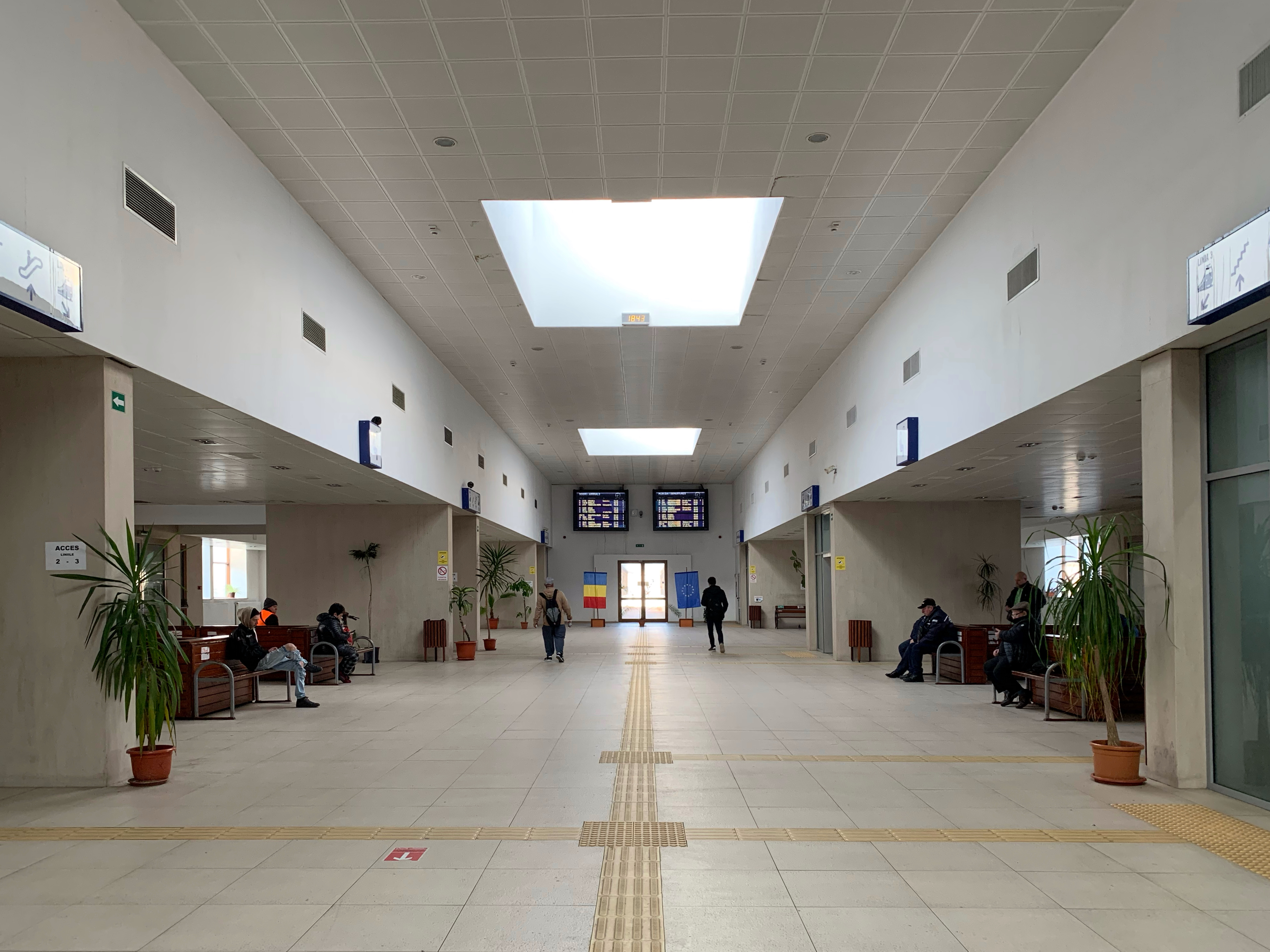
Waiting areas on the floor 1

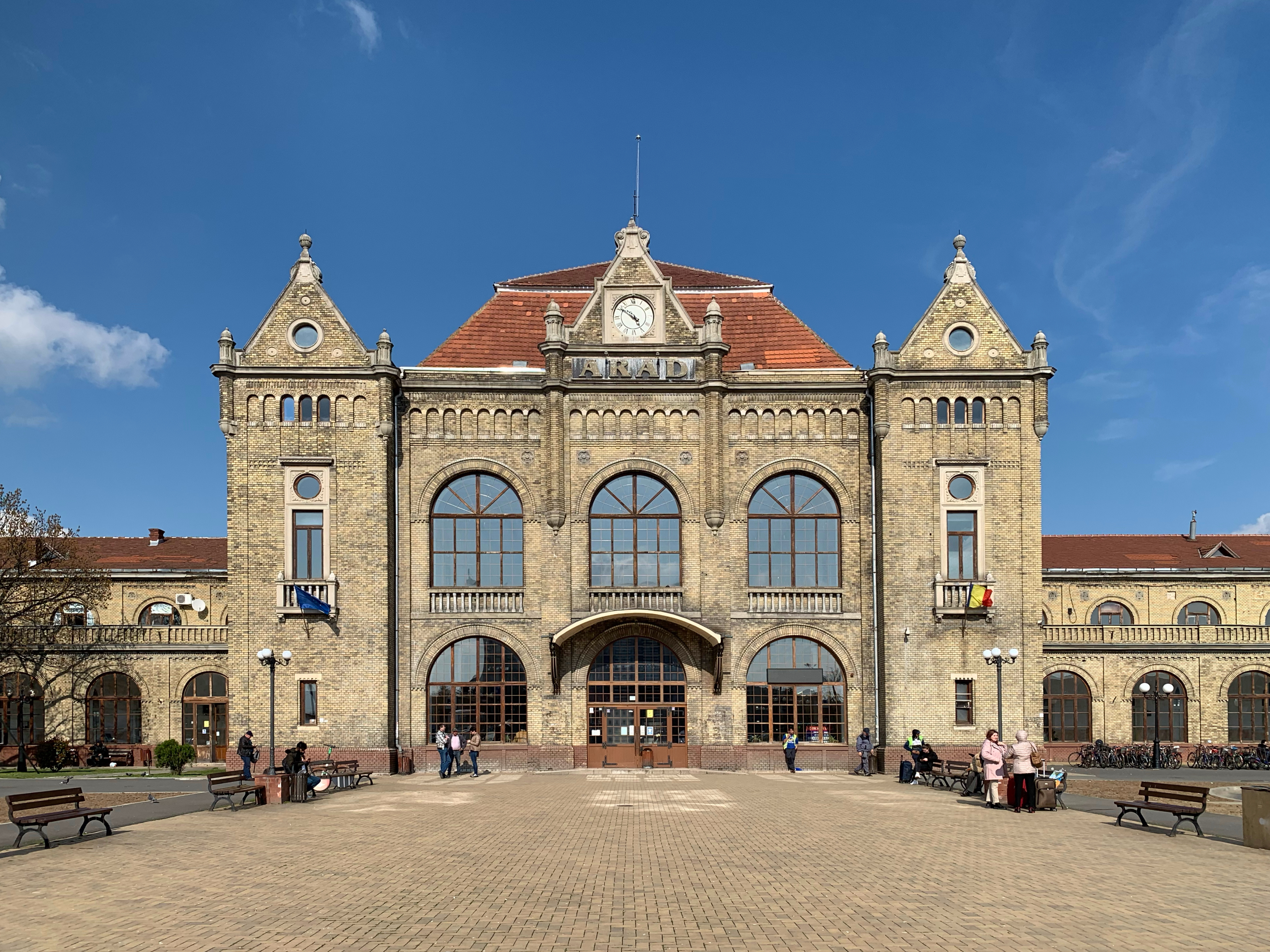
Station building's front facade
