= Beba Veche =

Beba Veche Óbéba
- Commune
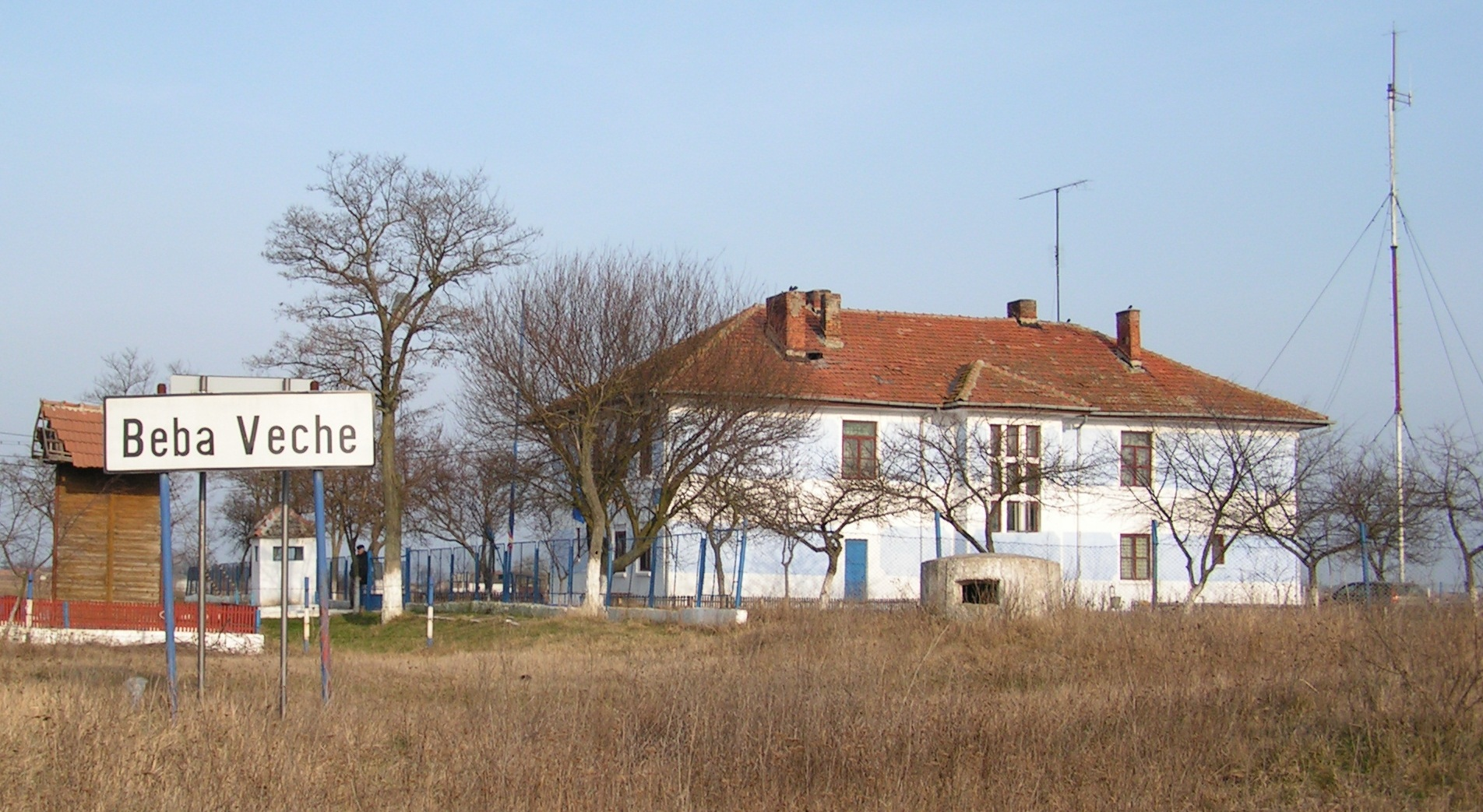

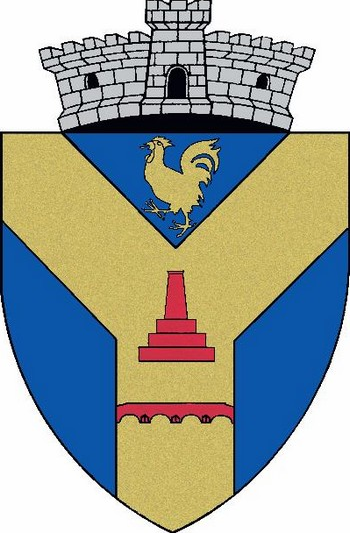
- Coat of arms

- Location in Timiș County

- Location in Romania
- Coordinates: 46°8′N 20°19′E
- Country: Romania
- County: Timiș

Government
  - Mayor (2004–): Ioan Bohancanu (PSD)
- Area: 94.04 km^{2} (36.31 sq mi)
- Elevation: 80 m (260 ft)
- Population (2021-12-01): 1,328
  - Density: 14.12/km^{2} (36.57/sq mi)
- Time zone: UTC+02:00 (EET)
  - Summer (DST): UTC+03:00 (EEST)
- Postal code: 307035–307037
- Vehicle reg.: TM
- Website: www.primariabebaveche.ro

Beba Veche (Hungarian: Óbéba; German: Altbeba; Serbian: Стара Беба, romanized: Stara Beba) is a commune in Timiș County. It is composed of three villages: Beba Veche (commune seat), Cherestur and Pordeanu. Beba Veche is the westernmost settlement in Romania.

== Geography ==
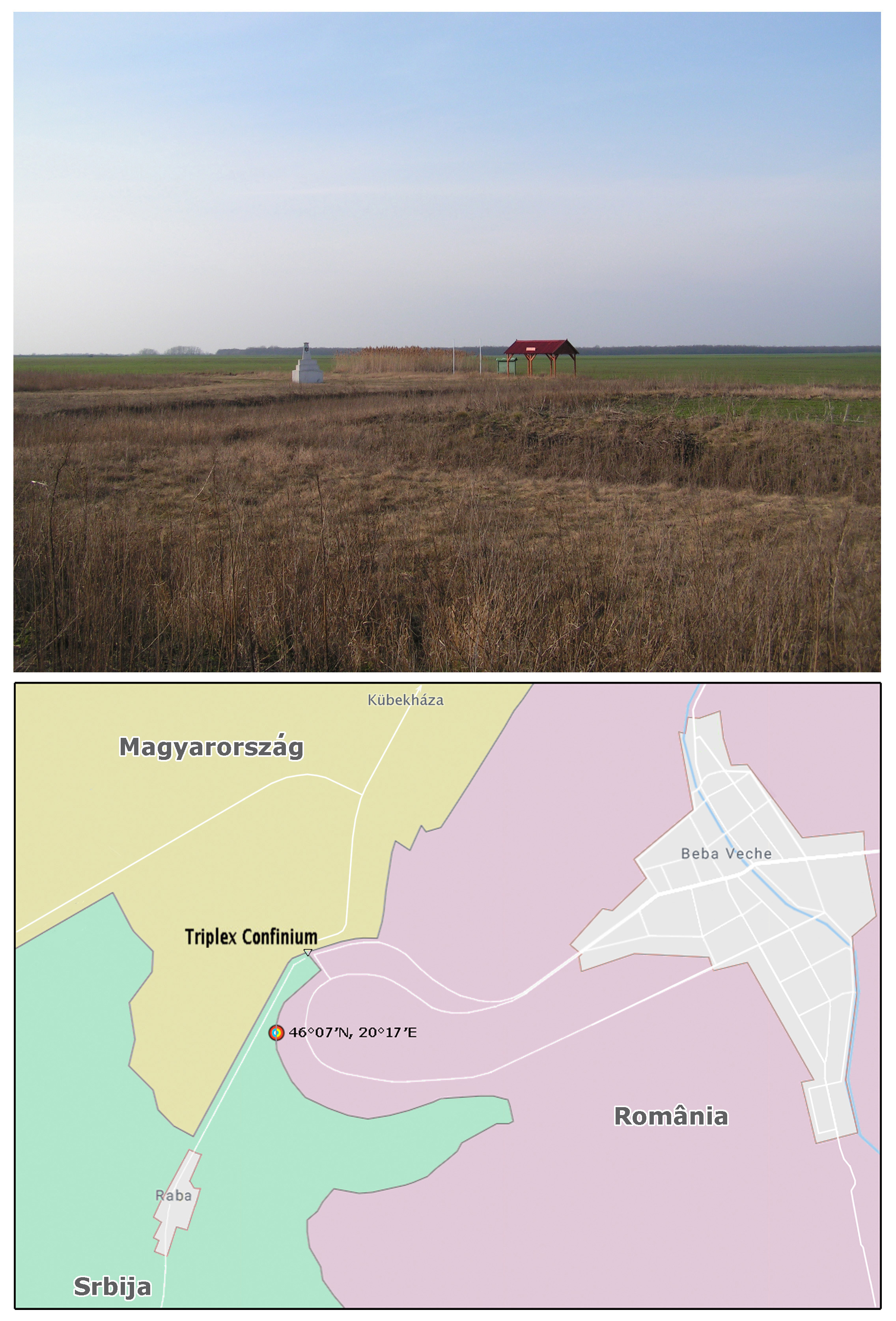
View to the northwest (Hungary). The Triplex Confinium monument and the old border strip can be seen.

Located in the eastern part of the Pannonian Plain on the border with Hungary and Serbia, the village is crossed by the 20°15′44″ meridian east in the westernmost point of Romania, called Triplex Confinium, where the borders of the three countries meet. Geographically, it is located in the Torontal Plain, at an average altitude of 80 m (260 ft). The nearest settlement is Kübekháza in Hungary, about 1.5 km (0.93 mi) away, to which Beba Veche was connected in the past by a direct road. The nearest town is Sânnicolau Mare, 34 km (21 mi) away. The distance by road to Timișoara is 100 km (62 mi); Szeged 88 km (55 mi); Bucharest 641 km (398 mi); Budapest 260 km (160 mi); Belgrade 239 km (149 mi) and Vienna 492 km (306 mi). The only access road to Beba Veche is the county road DJ682 Sânnicolau Mare–Beba Veche. The closest railway station is Dudeștii Vechi, some 26 km (16 mi) away.

=== Climate ===
Beba Veche is dominated by a moderate continental climate with Mediterranean influences from the Adriatic Sea and Mediterranean Sea due to the fact that it is protected by the Carpathians that prevent cold air from northeast and allow hot air from southwest and west. This makes winters milder, with a positive mean temperature (0.3 °C or 32.5 °F). The mean annual temperature is 10.8 °C (51.4 °F). The mean multiannual amount of precipitation is 536.5 mm (21.12 in), with the most abundant precipitation in May and June (23–25% of the mean annual amount); rainfall oscillations are rather high from one year to another (with a limit of 250 mm (9.8 in)); crops are stressed by excess moisture particularly during the first part of vegetation, while during the latter vegetation period (after August) humidity is insufficient.

== History ==
Beba Veche is one of the oldest settlements in Banat. Archaeological discoveries have led Swabian historiographer Felix Milleker to conclude that it dates back to the Stone Age. Judging by the tumuli discovered here, it can be said that it dates at least from the time of the Agathyrsi (6th century BC). Historian Nicolae Ilieșiu claims that until the 5th century, it was called Vitoliu, after the name of the Roman emperor Vitellius.

The first document attesting Beba Veche dates from 1247, during the reign of Béla IV of Hungary. It was mentioned as Béb in a chronicle preserved at the Museum of History in Cluj-Napoca. The settlement was originally owned by the Csanád clan; the name comes from one of the family members. At the end of the 13th century, due to repeated attacks of the Cumans, the village was depopulated. According to the Turkish census of 1557–1558, only 15 houses inhabited by Hungarians were registered in the settlement. In 1647, Rascian shepherds began to settle here, but they did not stay here for a long time either. After the Treaty of Passarowitz and the establishment of Austrian rule in Banat, it seems that Beba Veche was no longer inhabited, because on Mercy's map from 1723 to 1725, Beba is no longer mentioned.

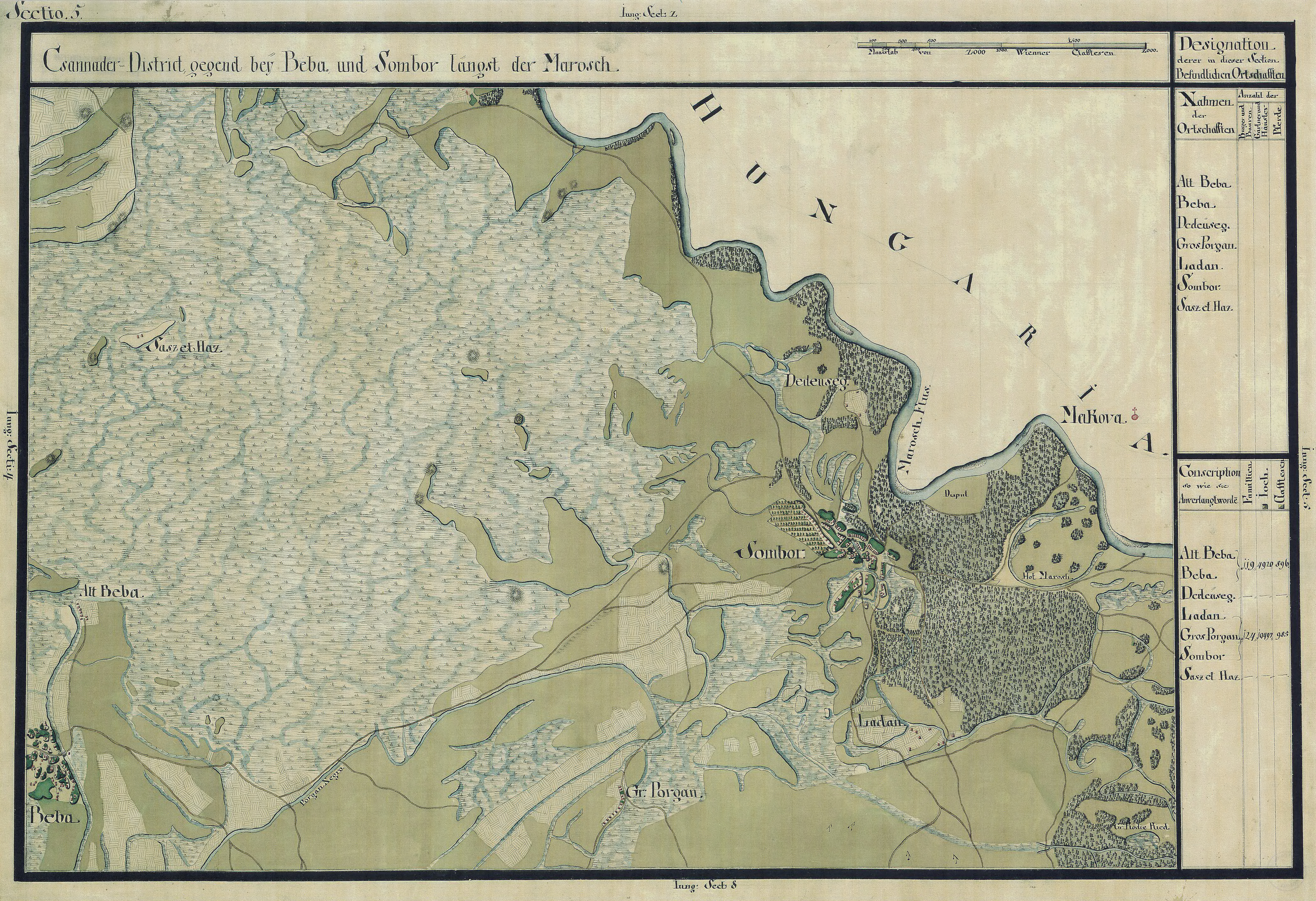
The district of Csanád with Beba in the lower left in the Josephinische Landesaufnahme of 1769–1772

In 1773, the Csanád ministry settled two villages on the site of the old locality: Kisbéba, where it invited Hungarian tobacco growers from Szeged area and Óbéba, which it handed over to Romanian-speaking settlers. In 1779, both settlements were annexed to Torontál County. By 1779, around 300 families of Swabians settled in Beba, as a result of the so-called "Theresian colonization" of Banat. Hungarian families re-settled in Óbéba only in 1782, thanks to Count Ignác Batthyány, Bishop of Transylvania. His estate at Beba also included Oroszlámos (beyond today's border), Valcani, Cherestur and Cociohat. In 1838, German colonists settled into Valcani, forming the village of Battyánháza, a name given in honor of the count-bishop. In time, the village merged with Beba Veche.

After the establishment of the Austro-Hungarian dualism in 1867, the administration of the commune was ensured by the servants of the Court. Among other things, the loss of the cultural identity of the Romanians in the commune was sought, by imposing the Hungarianization of the name and surname. This lasted until after World War I. Towards the end of the 19th century and the beginning of the 20th century, many inhabitants emigrated to America, and some of them returned with important capitals, helping economic development.

After World War I, according to the Treaty of Trianon of 1920, the Kingdom of Serbs, Croats and Slovenes was given Beba Veche, but in 1924, it was transferred to Romania, following a protocol concluded between Romania and Yugoslavia on 24 November 1923 for the rectification of the border.

== Demographics ==
Ethnic composition (2021)
1. Romanians (71.7%)
2. Hungarians (22.7%)
3. Unknown (4.89%)
4. Others (0.69%)
Religious composition (2021)
1. Orthodox (60.5%)
2. Roman Catholics (30.9%)
3. Pentecostals (1.58%)
4. Reformed (1.05%)
5. Unknown (5.27%)
6. Others (0.62%)

Beba Veche had a population of 1,328 inhabitants at the 2021 census, down 13.71% from the 2011 census. Most inhabitants are Romanians (71.68%), with a minority of Hungarians (22.74%). For 4.89% of the population, ethnicity is unknown. By religion, most inhabitants are Orthodox (60.54%), but there are also minorities of Roman Catholics (30.94%), Pentecostals (1.58%) and Reformed (1.05%). For 5.27% of the population, religious affiliation is unknown.

Census		Ethnic composition
Year	Population	Romanians	Hungarians	Germans	Roma
1880	4,576	1,838	2,212	507	–
1890	4,930	2,018	2,366	491	–
1900	5,065	2,126	2,461	437	–
1910	4,182	1,854	1,819	417	–
1920	1,039 (Note: Data on the populations of Battyánháza, Beba Veche and Cherestur missing)	66	918	34	–
1930	4,009	1,649	1,864	359	49
1941	3,655	1,452	1,721	351	–
1956	2,766	1,156	1,370	175	22
1966	2,427	1,092	1,161	134	1
1977	2,142	988	985	90	41
1992	1,625	898	640	19	47
2002	1,600	979	567	19	30
2011	1,539	951	498	20	18
2021	1,328	952	302	9	–

== Politics and administration ==
The commune of Beba Veche is administered by a mayor and a local council composed of 8 councilors. The mayor, Ioan Bohancanu, from the Social Democratic Party, has been in office since 2004. As from the 2024 local elections, the local council has the following composition by political parties:

Party	Seats	Composition
Social Democratic Party–National Liberal Party	6	
Alliance for the Union of Romanians	2	

== Economy ==
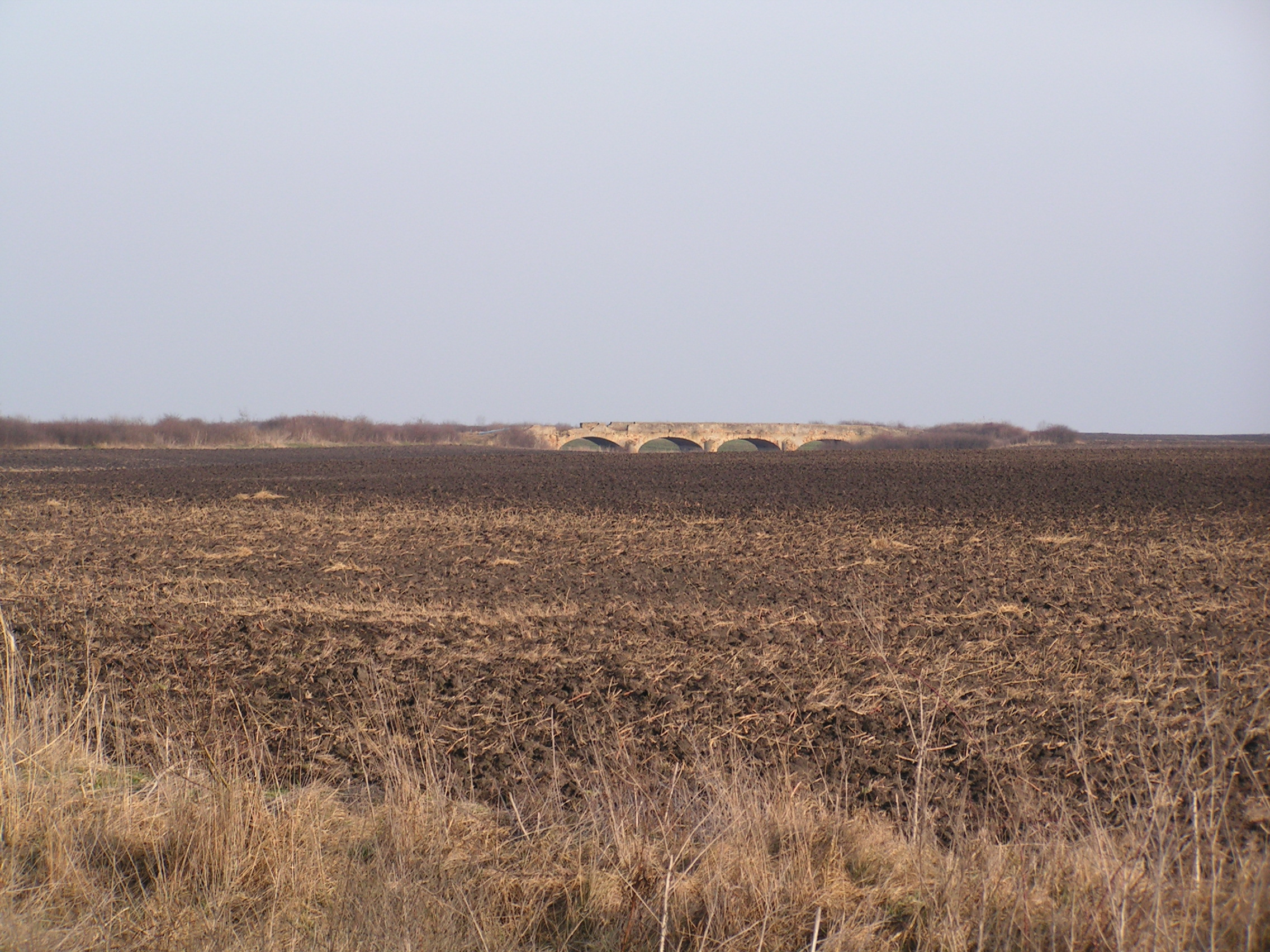
Ottoman era bridge in Beba Veche

The main sector of the economy is agriculture, which employs over 60% of the commune's inhabitants. The commune has a total area of 8,818 hectares of agricultural land. The main crops cultivated in the commune are wheat, rye, corn, and sunflower cultivated on 90% of the arable area, while only 10% is cultivated with vegetables and potato. As for livestock, the main species are cattle, swine, and poultry due to the grain crops and sheep due to the pastures representing 11% of the agricultural land.

In 2007, in the commune of Beba Veche, there were 14 firms with a turnover of 2,401,875 lei, indicating a low degree of economic development.

== Notable people ==
- Ödön Téry (1856–1917), pioneer of the Central European tourist movement and mountaineer
