= Căile Ferate Române main lines =

CFR main lines

The nine main lines owned by the Romanian national rail transport company Căile Ferate Române represent the most circulated lines in Romania. CFR's entire rail networks has 13,807 km (8,579 mi) and with the 6,923 km (4,302 mi) of rail lines in railway stations has a total network of 20,730 km (12,880 mi).

== History ==
The first railway line on Romania's present-day territory was opened on August 20, 1854, and ran between Oravița in Banat and Baziaș, a port on the Danube. The line, which had a length of 62.5 km (38.8 mi), was used solely for the transportation of coal. From January 12, 1855, the line was operated by the Imperial Royal Privileged Austrian State Railway Company, the Banat province being at that time part of the Austrian Empire. After several improvements in the following months, the line was opened to passenger traffic on November 1, 1856.

== Overview ==
Line	Main railway stations	Distance	Secondary lines	Map
100	București (north) – Roșiorii de Vede (north) – Craiova – Filiași – Caransebeș – Timișoara (north)	533 km	101 102 103 104 105 106 107 108 109 110 112 113 114 115 116 117 118 119 120 121 122 123 124 125 126 127 128
200	Brașov – Podu Olt – Sibiu – Vințu de Jos – Simeria – Arad – Curtici	500 km	200A 201 202 203 205 206 207 208 210 212 213 214 215 216 217 218 219 221
300	București (north) – Brașov – Sighișoara – Teiuș – Războieni – Cluj Napoca – Oradea	647 km	302 304 306 307 308 309 310 311 313 316 317 318
400	Brașov – Ciceu – Deda – Dej – Baia Mare – Satu Mare	560 km	401 402 403 404 405 406 409 412 413 417 418 421 422 423
500	București (north) – Ploiești (south) – Adjud – Bacău – Pașcani – Suceava – Vicșani	488 km	501 502 504 507 509 510 511 512 513 514 515 516 517 518
600	Făurei – Tecuci – Bârlad – Crasna – Vaslui – Iași – Ungheni	395 km	603 604 605 606 607 608
700	București (north) – Urziceni – Făurei – Brăila – Galați	229 km	701 702 703 704
800	București (north) – Ciulnița – Fetești – Medgidia – Constanța – Mangalia	225 km	801 802 803 804
1000	București (north) – Ploiești (south) – Ploiești (west)	59 km
