= Sinaia railway station =

Railway station and heritage site in Prahova County, Romania

Sinaia
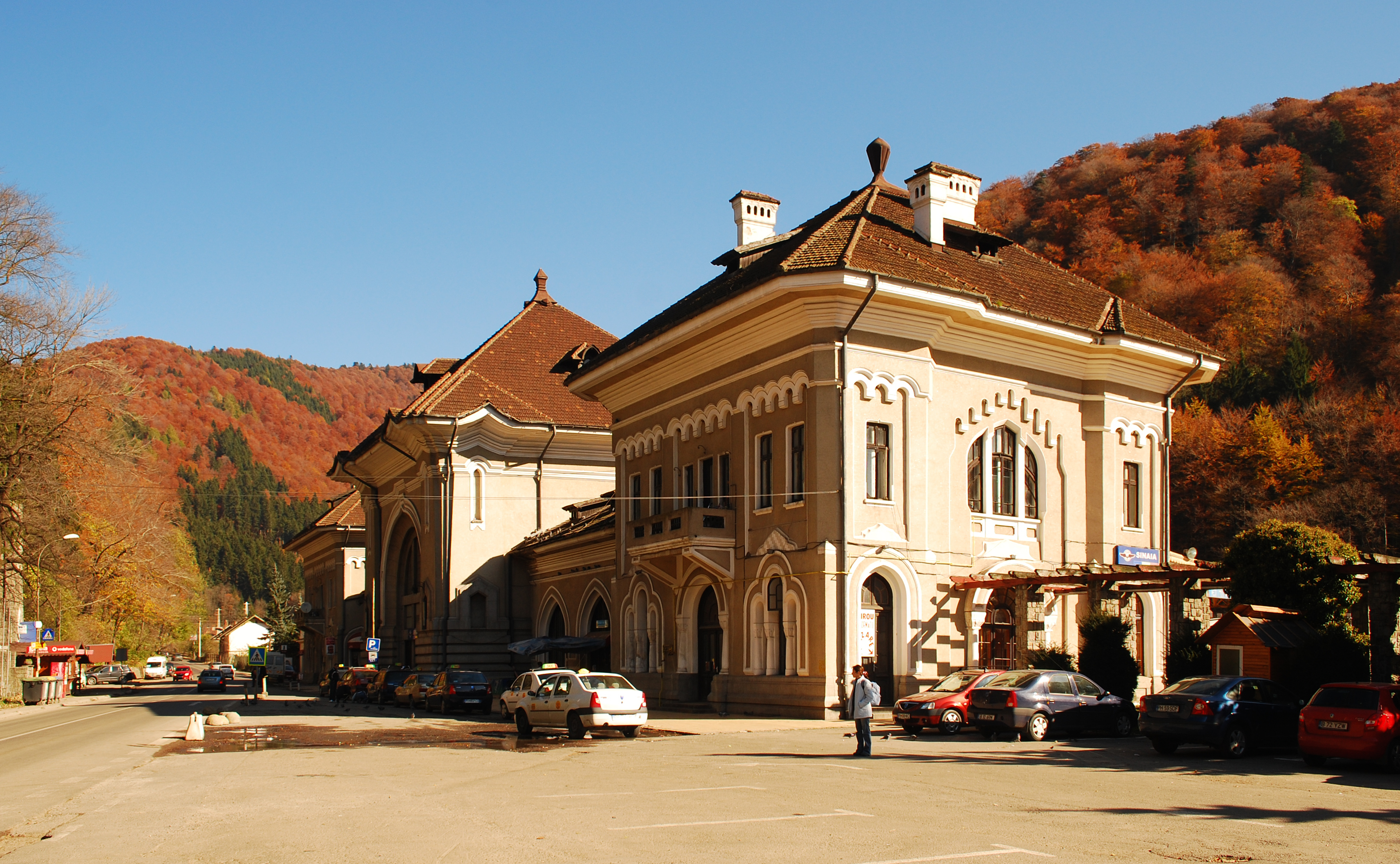
- View of the station building

General information
- Location: Sinaia, Romania
- Coordinates: 45°21′9.594″N 25°33′10.50″E
- Owner: CFR

History
- Electrified: yes (20 April 1966)

Services
Preceding station	CFR	Following station
Azuga towards Arad	CFR Intercity 200	Ploiești Vest towards București Nord
Azuga towards Oradea	CFR Intercity 300	Ploiești Vest towards București Nord
Azuga towards Târgu Mureș	CFR Intercity 400	Ploiești Vest towards Brașov
Preceding station	Venice Simplon-Orient-Express	Following station
Budapest Keleti towards Paris-Est	Paris–Istanbul	Istanbul Terminus
Location

Sinaia railway station serves the Sinaia mountain resort in Romania. The first station was built in 1913 by the Demeter Cartner Company, and it was reserved exclusively for the Royal Family and its guests at Peleș Castle, generally foreign leaders.

Located on the railway line connecting Bucharest and Ploiești to Brașov and the rest of Transylvania, the train station serves the Căile Ferate Române lines 200, 300, and 400.

== Memorials ==
On the station platform, there is a memorial plate marking the spot where Prime Minister Ion G. Duca was assassinated by the Iron Guard in 1933. A second memorial plaque was erected in 1999 to mark the celebrations then held to mark 120 years of the Ploiești to Brașov railway line.

== New ceremonial station ==
The second Ceremonial Railway Station is a short distance away from the first one, built following the plans of architect Duiliu Marcu in 1939. It is designed in a modern Neoclassical style, featuring an arcaded porch on both sides, and is constructed of rustic random stone blocks. Originally displaying the Hohenzollern coat of arms, it has remained in use as a ceremonial station for state occasions and guests. Its single platform is continuous with platform 1 of the original (and now public) railway station. The building also featured a depot housing the Royal Train.

In front of the ceremonial station there is a large plaza designed with the purpose of holding official welcome ceremonies for various foreign leaders. The main room is decorated with a wall painting (5.50 meters x 5.50 meters) depicting a boar hunt of Prince Basarab I of Wallachia (eight life-size characters on horseback, alongside an inscription in Latin reading Basarab Voivode, 14th century).

The ceremonial station's purpose was retained during the communist regime. A presidential train brought American President Gerald Ford and Romanian President Nicolae Ceaușescu here on August 6, 1975. It is not open to the public.

== Exhibitions ==
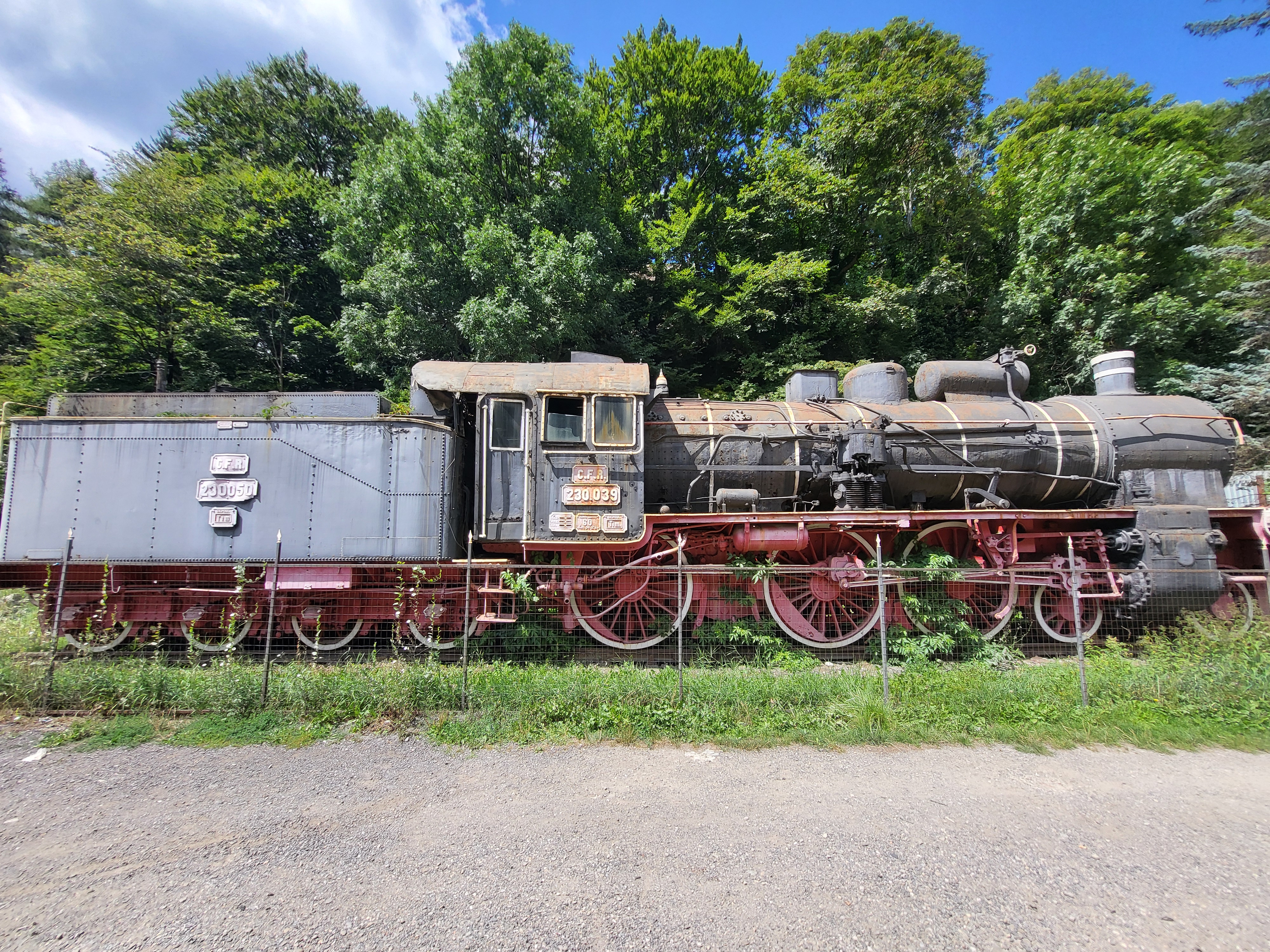
Steam locomotive number 230.039

The main railway station, originally constructed with a large booking hall and extensive offices, now features additional attractions.

The northern part of the station building has been transformed into a model railway exhibition, which is open to the public most days. Beyond the model exhibition, several static displays of railway memorabilia are exhibited on the platform, including the 230 series 4-6-0 steam locomotive number 230.039, built in 1907 at the German LINCKE HOFMAN works with the production number 1017/1907. This locomotive, which served from 1907 to 1978, was used for passenger trains, express freight, and shunting operations, mainly in the Banat and Transylvania regions, achieving speeds of up to 100 km/h. In 2000, it was designated part of the National Cultural Heritage under the treasure category. The locomotive is displayed alongside the tender of its sister engine, 230.050.

1948 Škoda VOS draisine, a motor car adapted for railway track inspection duties, equipped with flanged wheels. It is known as the “machine with train wheels,” was famously used by the feared communist leader Ana Pauker, as well as other high-ranking communist officials, for travel across the country. It was heavily armored, and the shattered windshield is said to be the result of an assassination attempt just before 1950, where an unknown assailant used an automatic weapon in an attempt to kill Ana Pauker. Despite the impressive thickness of the glass, it could not withstand the barrage of bullets. The vehicle, which resembles a car but is as robust as a tank and moves like a train, is a unique piece among Romania’s railway vehicles. In its prime, the railcar could easily exceed 100 km/h, had a luxurious interior, was powered by a motor exceeding 5000 cubic centimeters, and weighed 5000 kilograms.

== In popular culture ==
The Sinaia royal railway station was used as one of the film sets for the 2022 TV series Wednesday, where it is used to portray Burlington Station, a real-life railway station located near the show's main setting in Jericho, Vermont.

== Gallery ==
All photos were taken before 2010. The station was reconstructed between 2009 and 2011.

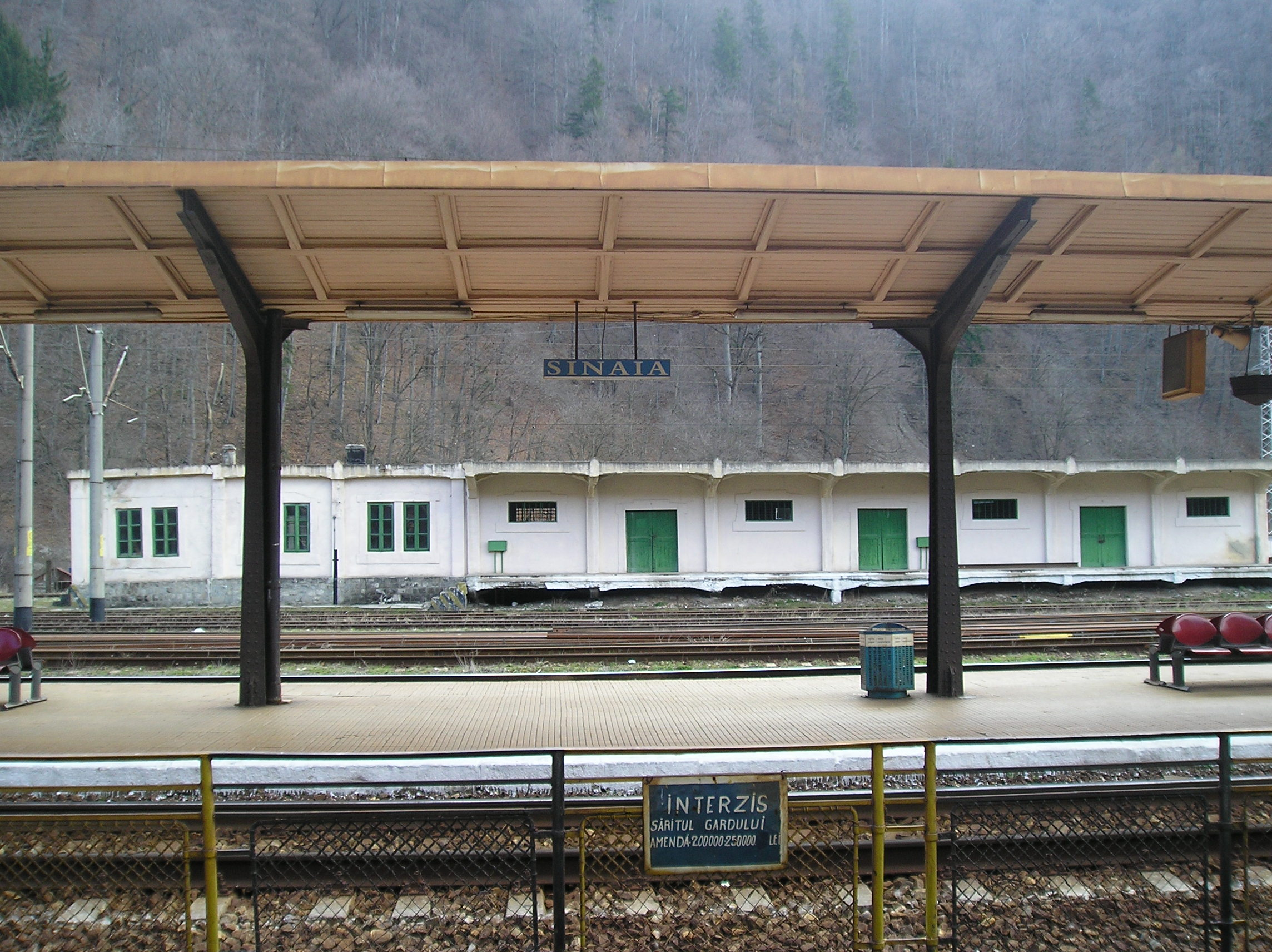
Platforms 2 and 3, seen from platform 1

Looking north from platform 1

Looking south from platform 1

Platform 1 and the main station building as seen from platform 2
