= Imre Mudin =

Hungarian athlete

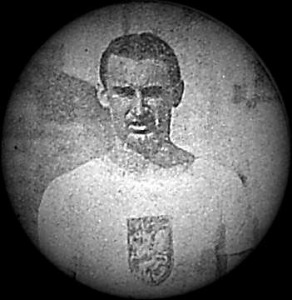

Personal information
- Full name: Imre Mudin
- Nationality: Hungarian
- Born: 8 November 1887 Kétegyháza, Kingdom of Hungary, Austria-Hungary
- Died: 23 October 1918 (aged 30) Monte Grappa, Kingdom of Italy

Sport
- Country: Kingdom of Hungary
- Sport: Discus throw, javelin throw, shot put

Achievements and titles
- Personal bests: Discus throw – 42.72 m (1916); Javelin throw – 56.90 m (1912); Shot put – 14.08 m (1914)

Imre Mudin (8 November 1887 – 23 October 1918) was a Hungarian teacher, track and field athlete and soldier. An all-around sportsman, he won national titles in shot put, discus throw and javelin throw as well. Mudin was present at the 1908 Summer Olympics and the 1912 Summer Olympics, achieving his best result, a sixth place in shot put at the latter one.

From 1914, he fought in World War I for the Austro-Hungarian Army. He died in the battle for the control of the Monte Grappa massif on the Italian front.

His brother István Mudin was also an athlete and the flagbearer of Hungary at the 1908 Olympic Games.

== Early life ==
He was born in Kétegyháza, Kingdom of Hungary to Albert Mudin, a hatmaker, who was originally from France, and Róza Hécsel. Imre was the youngest of six siblings, with two sisters (Mária and Sarolta) and three brothers (Albert, István and Béla Albert). Except István, all of his siblings died before reaching adulthood.

Mudin attended the elementary school in his hometown before moving to Arad to earn civil and teaching qualifications. He graduated as a teacher in 1911 in Budapest and got a position by a boys' school in Nagyatád.

== Athletics career ==
Mudin, a member of the Magyar Atlétikai Club since he was 18, began to practice shot put under the guidance of his brother. He soon excelled with his performances, having broken the Hungarian national record at an Olympic test event in June 1908 with 12.88 metres. At the 1908 Olympic Games he took the seventh place in the freestyle javelin throw and also participated in the Greek discus throw competition and in the discus throw event, however, his final ranking is unknown in both competitions. Four years later, yet as the competitor of Nagyatádi Atlétkiai Club, he finished sixth in the shot put competition.

Among his successes were nine national titles in the shot put (1908–1914, 1916–17), and two each in the discus throw (1910, 1916) and the javelin throw (1916–1917). Mudin finished third behind Armas Taipale in the shot put event at the British 1914 AAA Championships.

Besides competing in athletics, Mudin was also a mathematics, physics, and natural history teacher in Nagyatád. Upon arriving at the school in 1911, he augmented the insect collection with 200 prepared butterflies. As a sportsman, he called for an active sporting life and had an imperishable role in the development of community sports activities in Somogy County. In 1912, he organized the first sports competition for boys' schools in the county, which later became a traditional contest. In 1913 Mudin relocated from Nagyatád to Kaposvár where he taught in the local school that today bears the name of Dániel Berzsenyi. He joined World War I a year later.

== Death and legacy ==
Mudin was assigned to the 101st Infantry Regiment of the Austro-Hungarian Army in sub-lieutenant rank. He began active service on 11 August 1914. For his commitments on the battlefield, he was awarded the Silver Medal of Bravery 1st Class in 1915. He did not cease practising athletics while in the army, and in 1916 and 1917, he got permission to leave for the period of the Hungarian Athletics Championships, winning a treble in 1916 (discus throw, javelin throw, shot put) and a double in the following year (javelin throw, shot put).

In May 1918, Mudin was promoted to first lieutenant. He died on 23 October 1918 in the battle of Monte Grappa. He was shot by a marksman while retreating and fell into an abyss. Mudin's body was not found and was declared missing.

Mudin left behind a widow, Melina Pavlovlits, an opera singer. The two married in 1915 and had no children. Pavlovits never married again and died in Budapest in 1991.

Today the stadium of Nagyatád bears the name of Imre Mudin, and the sports hall of Kétegyháza was named in the honor of the Mudin brothers and known as Mudin Sports Hall since 2008.

== Notes ==
- Kalcsó, István (2008). A Mudin fivérek. Kétegyháza: Private publishing. ISBN 978-963-06-5460-9.
