= Beba Veche Ornithological Reserve =

Nature Reserve in Romania

- IUCN category IV (habitat/species management area)
- Location within Romania
- Location: Pordeanu (Beba Veche), Timiș County, Romania
- Coordinates: 46°8′50″N 20°21′34″E
- Area: 2,187 ha (8.44 sq mi)
- Established: 1995, 2000

The Beba Veche Ornithological Reserve is a nationally protected area classified under IUCN Category IV (ornithological nature reserve). It is situated in Timiș County, within the administrative boundaries of Beba Veche commune.

== Location ==
It is situated in the far northwestern part of Timiș County and spans an area of 2,187 hectares (5,400 acres) near the village of Pordeanu, close to the borders with Hungary and Serbia.

== Description ==
The Beba Veche Ornithological Reserve was declared a protected area of national importance by Law No. 5 of March 6, 2000. The reserve is home to the great bustard (Otis tarda), a rare steppe bird species that has begun to reestablish itself in the area after being considered extinct in Romania since the 1970s. Historically, the species was widespread across the Bărăgan Plain, northern Moldavia, the Transylvanian Plateau, and the Western Plain, with ornithologists estimating a national population of approximately 5,000 individuals a century ago. In recent years, a small number of individuals have started to recolonize western Romania, likely migrating from neighboring populations in Hungary and Serbia, although their presence remains limited and fragmented.
