= Adrian Drida =

Romanian former football player

Personal information
- Full name: Adrian Ioan Drida
- Date of birth: 5 January 1982 (age 44)
- Place of birth: Sântana, Romania
- Height: 1.79 m (5 ft 10 1/2 in)
- Position: Midfielder

Youth career
- 1995–1996: UTA Arad
- 1996–1997: Motorul CFR Arad
- 1998–1999: Romvest Arad

Senior career*
Years	Team	Apps	(Gls)
1999–2005	UTA Arad	86	(12)
2004–2007	Jiul Petroşani	53	(13)
2008–2010	UTA Arad	?	(?)
2010–2011	Politehnica Iași	17	(4)
2011–2013	Jiul Petroșani	?	(?)
- * Club domestic league appearances and goals as of 2 January 2018

Adrian Ioan Drida (born 5 January 1982 in Sântana) is a Romanian former football player who played as a midfielder.

== Club career ==
Drida started his career playing for UTA Arad, from where he was also loaned to Motorul CFR Arad and Romvest Arad and in 2004 he is signed by Jiul Petroşani.

A new transfer, this time to Steaua Bucharest, his favourite team in football, followed in 2006. However, Drida failed to impress coach Cosmin Olăroiu and he is loaned back to his former club during the 2006–07 season.

=== Politehnica Iasi ===
In June 2010 he joined Politehnica Iași but after only one season, he was transferred to FC Milsami, in Moldova.
