= Brașov railway station =

Railway station in Brașov, Romania

Gara Brașov
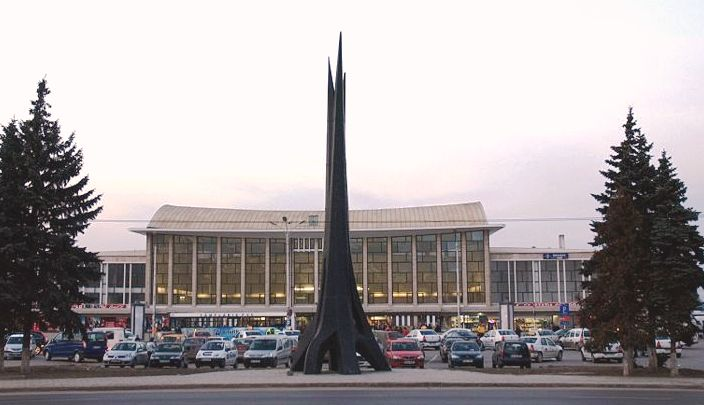
- View of the station building

General information
- Location: Bulevardul Gării, Nr. 1, Brașov, Romania
- Coordinates: 45°39′40.18″N 25°36′48.62″E
- Owner: CFR

Construction
- Parking: yes

History
- Opened: 1873
- Rebuilt: 1962
- Electrified: 9 June 1963 (for trials); 9 December 1965 (for regular service)

Services
Preceding station	CFR	Following station
Sighișoara towards Arad	CFR Intercity 200	Predeal towards București Nord
Sighișoara towards Oradea	CFR Intercity 300	Predeal towards București Nord
Sfântu Gheorghe towards Târgu Mureș	CFR Intercity 400	Predeal towards Brașov
Location

The Brașov railway station is the main station in Brașov, Romania. The building on the current location was opened to traffic in 1962. The station's bell chimes preceding the announcements represent a few notes from Ciprian Porumbescu's operetta Crai Nou.

== Services ==
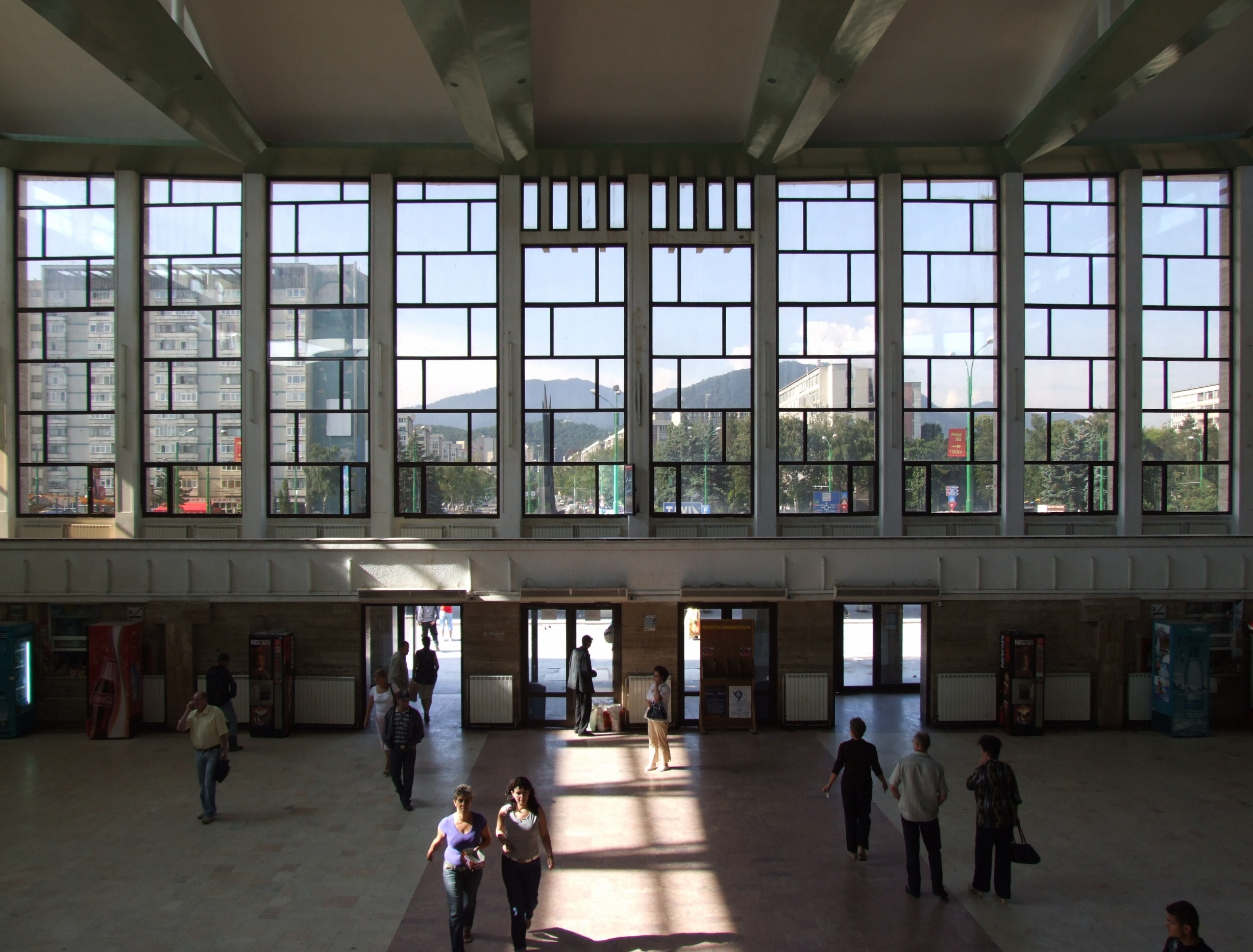
Interior

The station is located at the confluence of several main lines in Romania. In 2008, the Brașov railway station served about 140 passenger trains to a majority of Romanian cities. Regio Călători operates from Brașov station to Făgăraș, Întorsura Buzăului, as well as to Zărnești, along with state-operated trains from Căile Ferate Române.

The international trains run to Budapest (Hungary) and to Vienna (Austria); formerly they also connected with Prague (Czech Republic), Bratislava (Slovakia), and Kraków (Poland). The railway station is served by bus lines and also by two trolleybus lines, operated by RAT Brașov. Prior to 2007, the station was served by a tram line. In 2007 the tram line was replaced by a trolleybus line.

== Main lines ==
- Line 200: Brașov – Sibiu – Vințu de Jos – Deva – Curtici
- Line 300: Bucharest – Ploiești – Brașov – Sighișoara – Teiuș – Cluj-Napoca – Oradea – Episcopia Bihor
- Line 400: Brașov – Sfântu Gheorghe – Miercurea Ciuc – Deda – Dej – Baia Mare – Satu Mare

== Distance from other railway stations ==
=== Romania ===
- Bucharest: 166 km
- Arad: 453 km
- Cluj-Napoca: 331 km
- Constanța (via București Nord): 391 km
- Craiova: 335 km
- Galați: 310 km
- Iași: 470 km
- Oradea: 484 km
- Satu Mare (via Cluj Napoca, Baia Mare): 583 km
- Suceava (Burdujeni): 457 km
- Timișoara: 456 km

=== Europe ===
- Belgrade: 634 km
- Berlin: 1,733 km
- Budapest: 706 km
- Chișinău: 584 km
- Frankfurt am Main: 1,733 km
- Kyiv: 1,241 km
- Sofia: 705 km
- Venice: 1,557 km
- Vienna: 978 km
