= List of extreme points of Romania =

This is a list of the extreme points of Romania, the points that are farther north, south, east or west than any other location.

== Latitude and longitude ==
- Northernmost point: Horodiștea, a village in Botoșani County, on the border with Moldova, 48°15′N 26°43′E
  - Historical: Babin, Cernăuți County (now Babyn, Chernivtsi Oblast, Ukraine)
- Southernmost point: Zimnicea, a town in Teleorman County, on the border with Bulgaria, 43°40′N 25°22′E
  - Historical: Ecrene, Caliacra County (now Kranevo, Dobrich Province, Bulgaria)
- Westernmost point: Beba Veche, a village in Timiș County, on the border with Hungary and Serbia, 46°08′N 20°19′E
- Easternmost point: Sulina, a town in Tulcea County, on the Danube Delta, 45°09′N 29°40′E (just continental Romania) — 45.1448,29.7674 (including islands). Also the easternmost points in the contiguous EU (22 states)
  - Historical: Bugaz, Cetatea Albă County (now Zatoka, Odesa Oblast, Ukraine)

== Height ==
- Highest Point: Moldoveanu Peak, in the Făgăraș Mountains, (2,544 m), 45°35′57″N 24°44′10″E
- Lowest Point: Black Sea shore

== See also ==
- Geography of Romania
- Extreme points of Europe
- Extreme points of the European Union
