= Aurel Suciu =

Aurel Suciu (1853 – 14 February 1898) was an Austro-Hungarian ethnic Romanian lawyer and political activist.

Born in Kétegyháza (Chitighaz), a village that today lies in Békés County, Hungary, his father Petru was a notary there and in nearby Pusztaottlaka (Otlaca). His grandfather Nicolae, a priest in Gyula (Jula, Giula), was the brother-in-law of Moise Nicoară. After completing primary school, Suciu attended gymnasium in Békés (Bichiș), Szarvas and Beiuș. He completed the study of law in Oradea, passing the bar in 1879 and settling in Arad. Initially working under Mircea V. Stănescu, he developed a good reputation as a lawyer. A pious member of the Romanian Orthodox Church, he represented Șiria in the national synod and had a deep sense of the church's historic mission. He was a life member of Asociația națională arădană pentru cultura poporului român, frequently sitting on its leadership. He also belonged to the local women's association, which he helped financially, and to the theater society. He contributed to village schools, cultural societies and libraries, and in 1886 helped found a bank.

Suciu joined the Romanian National Party (PNR) after its establishment in 1881, sitting on its executive from 1892 to 1894. He became a prominent advocate on behalf of Transylvania's Romanians. In 1892, he helped draft the Transylvanian Memorandum. In May 1892, he was part of a delegation to Vienna that aimed to submit the document to Emperor Francis Joseph, who refused to receive the petitioners. A year later, together with the PNR's entire executive, he was indicted by the Hungarian authorities; the trial was held at Cluj in May 1894. He was sentenced to a year and a half in prison and initially returned to Arad with his co-defendant Mihai Veliciu; the two received a hero's welcome. In early August, once the sentence was upheld, they were arrested and led to the train station by local peasants, soldiers and intellectuals. When the train passed through Budapest, a crowd of Romanians greeted them. Finally, the two arrived at their destination, the prison at Vác. All the signatories were released in September 1895, following a pardon from Franz Joseph. Suciu had become ill during his detention, and unsuccessfully sought treatment in Vienna. His health gradually declined until he died at Arad on 14 February 1898; the funeral served as an occasion for a patriotic demonstration by the hundreds of Romanians who attended.
