= Mezőberény =

- Town
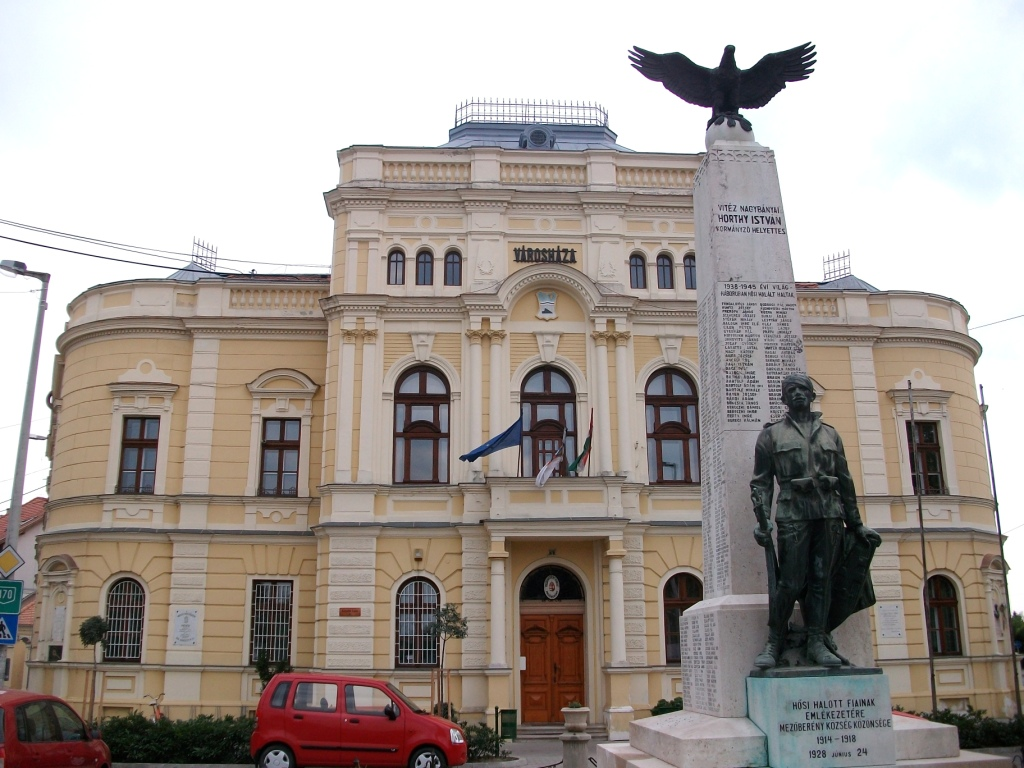
- Mezőberény town hall, WWI, WWII and István Horthy memorial with Turul bird

- Flag Coat of arms

- Location within Hungary
- Coordinates: 46.4932°N 21.144°E
- Country: Hungary
- County: Békés
- District: Békés

Area
  - Total: 118.53 km^{2} (45.76 sq mi)

Population (2009)
  - Total: 11,241
  - Density: 94.837/km^{2} (245.63/sq mi)
- Time zone: UTC+1 (CET)
  - Summer (DST): UTC+2 (CEST)
- Postal code: 5650
- Area code: (+36) 66
- Website: www.mezobereny.hu

Mezőberény (Hungarian pronunciation: [ˈmɛzøːbɛreːɲ]; German: Maisbrünn; Slovak: Poľný Berinčok) is a town in Békés county, Hungary.

== Location ==
Mezőberény is located in the Great Hungarian Plain, 200 km southeast from Budapest. Highway 46, 47 and Budapest-Szolnok-Békéscsaba-Lökösháza high speed (120–160 km/h (75–99 mph)) railway line also cross the town.

== History ==
The Medieval village of Berény was ruined due to the Ottoman wars, native Hungarian population fled from the area. It was rebuilt in the 18th century with German, Hungarian and Slovak settlers and was a multiethnic town until the late 19th century, when Germans and Slovaks adopted the Hungarian language. In 1881, the town had a population of 11,368 people, of which 4,267 were Slovaks, 3,860 Hungarians, 2,614 Germans and 627 of other ethnicites.

== Notable people ==
- Soma Orlai Petrich (1822–1880), painter

== Twin towns – sister cities ==
Mezőberény is twinned with:

- Čantavir (Subotica), Serbia
- Gronau, Germany
- Kolárovo, Slovakia
- Münsingen, Germany
- Sovata, Romania
