= Kétegyháza =

Kétegyháza Chitighaz
- Village
- Coat of arms

- Location of Kétegyháza in Hungary
- Coordinates: 46°32′56″N 21°11′1″E
- Country: Hungary
- Region: Southern Great Plain
- County: Békés
- Subregion: Gyulai

Government
  - Mayor: Mária Gyuricska (Independent)

Area
  - Total: 50.49 km^{2} (19.49 sq mi)

Population (2010)
  - Total: 4,135
  - Density: 81.90/km^{2} (212.1/sq mi)
- Time zone: UTC+1 (CET)
  - Summer (DST): UTC+2 (CEST)
- Postal code: 5741
- Area code: +36 66
- KSH code: 03461
- Website: ketegyhaza.hu

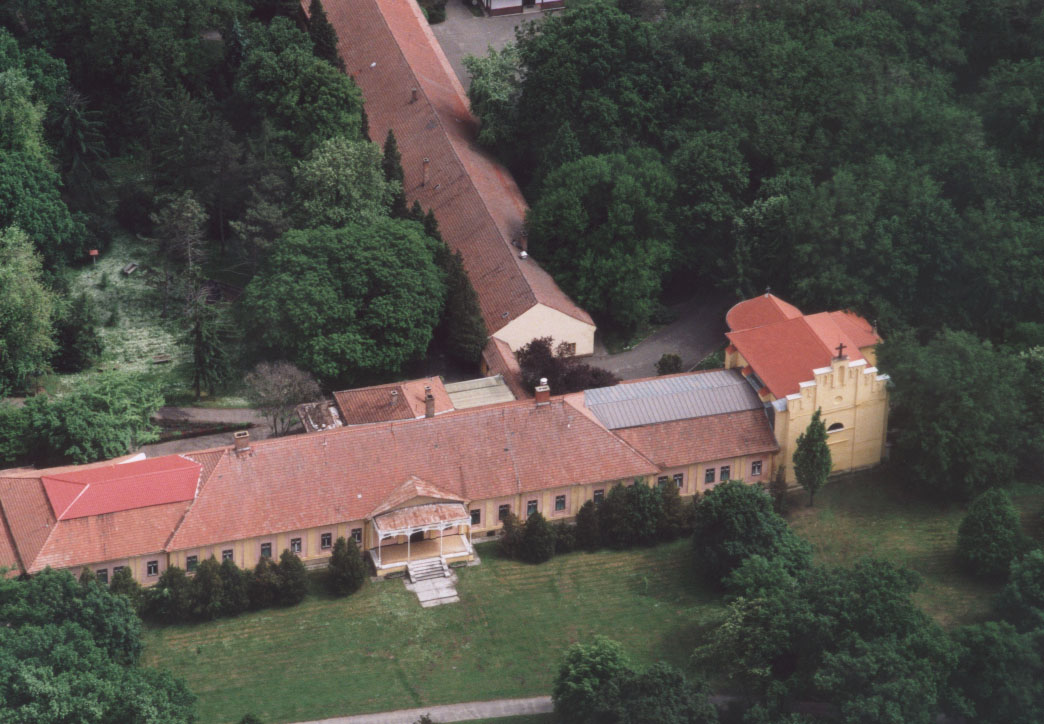
Kétegyháza - Palace

Kétegyháza (Hungarian pronunciation: [ˈkeːtɛchaːzɒ]; Romanian: Chitighaz) is a large village in Békés County, in the Southern Great Plain region of south-east Hungary. It is one of the main centres of Hungary's Romanian minority.

Jews lived in the village in the 19th century and in 1944 many of them were murdered in the Holocaust of the Jews of Hungary.

== Notable people ==
- Franz Czeisler - circus impresario and illusionist
- Sándor Márki - historiographer, professor
- József Kalcsó – painter
- Imre Mudin – athlete, Olympic participant
- István Mudin – athlete, flagbearer of Hungary at the 1908 Olympics, older brother of Imre
- Aurel Suciu - signatory of the Transylvanian Memorandum

== Tourist sights ==
- Machine museum - collection of agricultural machinery and equipment
- Romanian country house
- Jewish Cemetery
