= Secusigiu =

- Commune
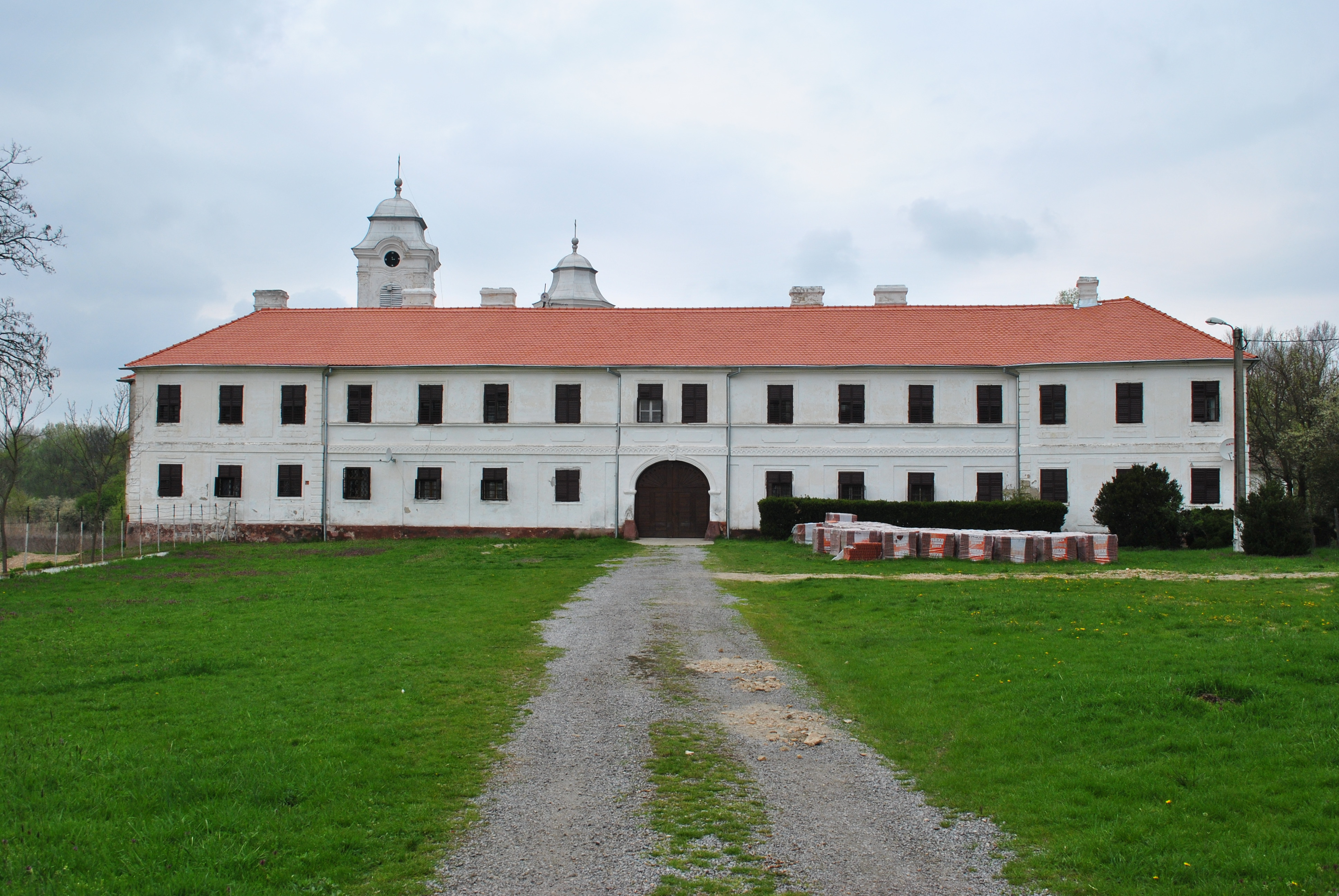
- Bezdin Serbian monastery in Munar

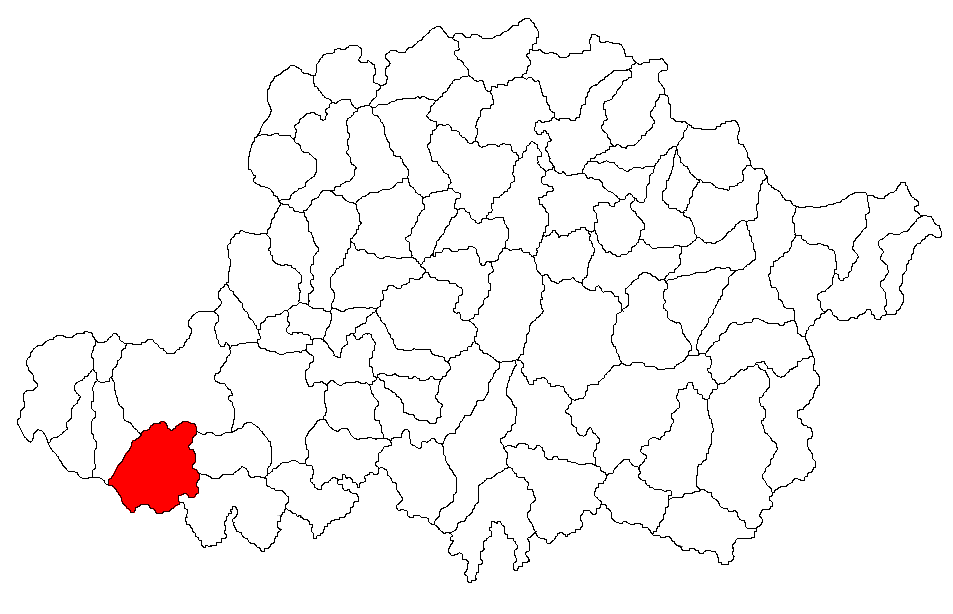
- Location in Arad County

- Location in Romania
- Coordinates: 46°5′N 20°59′E
- Country: Romania
- County: Arad
- Population (2021-12-01): 5,534
- Time zone: UTC+02:00 (EET)
  - Summer (DST): UTC+03:00 (EEST)
- Vehicle reg.: AR

Secusigiu (Hungarian: Székesút) is a commune in Arad County, Romania, is situated in the north-western part of the Vingăi Plateau and it occupies 17202 ha. It is composed of four villages: Munar (Munár), Satu Mare (Temesnagyfalu), Sânpetru German (Németszentpéter; German: Deutschsanktpeter) and Secusigiu (situated at 31 km from Arad).

== Population ==
According to the 2002 census the population of the commune counts 5838 inhabitants, out of which 82.4% are Romanians, 7.0% Hungarians, 5.0% Roma, 1.4% Germans, 3.6% Ukrainians and 0.6% are of other or undeclared nationalities.

== History ==
The first documentary record of Secusigiu dates back to 1359. Munar was attested documentarily in 1219, Satu Mare in 1333, while Sânpetru German in 1335.

== Tourism ==
The Natural park "Lunca Mureșului", the reservation called "Prundul Mare", the church built in 1529, the Serb monastery situated on the bank of the Mureș River, 4 km from Munar, the church demolished by the Turks and rebuilt between 1776–1781 in Baroque style, the lake with white water-lily close to the monastery, the boundary-stones in Munar, the Roman Catholic Church built in 1774 and Saint Peter's Statue put up in the centre of Sânpetru German are the most important sights of the commune.

== Economy ==
The economy is mostly based on agriculture, most notably on Corn, Wheat, Sunflower, Tomatoes, and Melon crops while the industry is based on manufacturing goods.

== Education ==
Currently in the commune there are 5 schools and 4 kindergartens, The newest kindergarten was built in 2019.
