= Sântana =

- Town
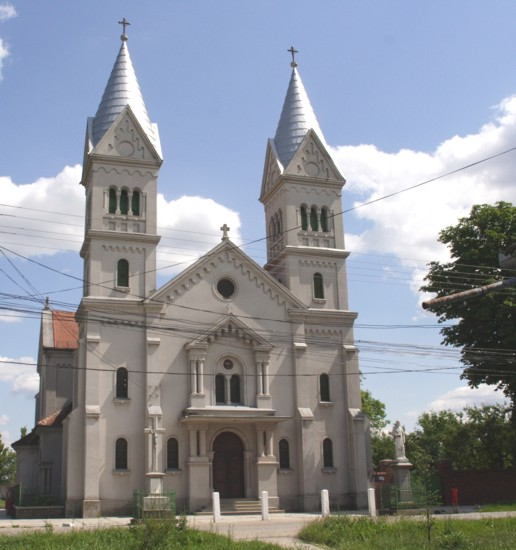

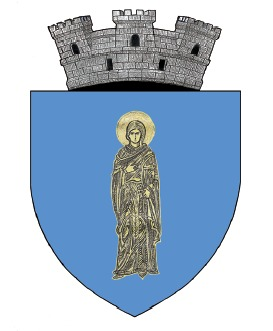
- Coat of arms

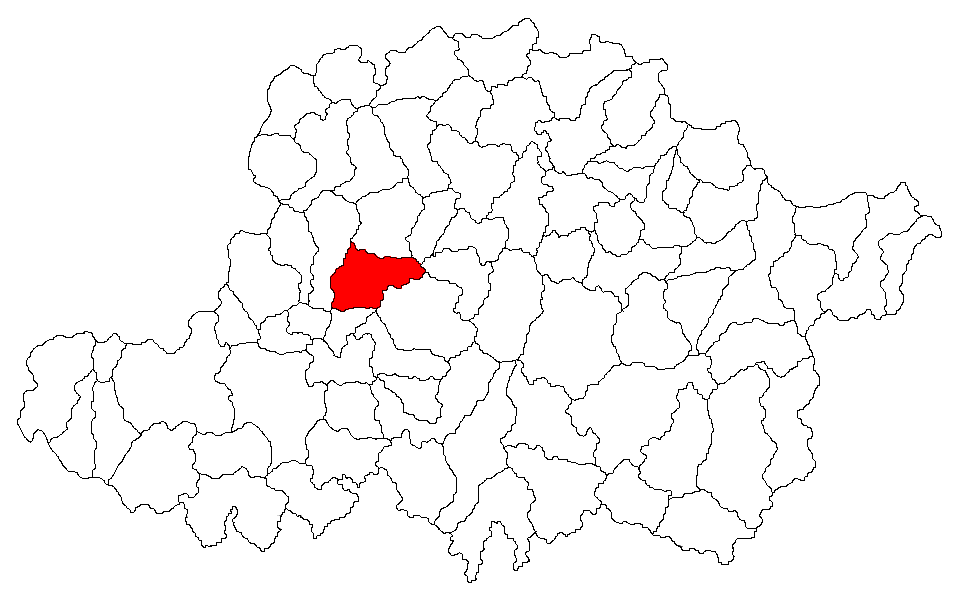
- Location of Sântana

- Location in Romania
- Coordinates: 46°21′N 21°30′E
- Country: Romania
- County: Arad

Government
  - Mayor (2024–2028): Daniel-Sorin Tomuța (PNL)
- Area: 107.14 km^{2} (41.37 sq mi)
- Elevation: 99 m (325 ft)
- Population (2021-12-01): 12,460
  - Density: 116.3/km^{2} (301.2/sq mi)
- Time zone: UTC+02:00 (EET)
  - Summer (DST): UTC+03:00 (EEST)
- Postal code: 317280
- Vehicle reg.: AR
- Website: www.primariasantana.ro

Sântana (Romanian pronunciation: [sɨnˈtana]; German: Neusanktanna; Hungarian: Újszentanna) is a town in north-western Romania, in the county of Arad. Declared a town in 2003, it administers one village, Caporal Alexa (Erdőskerek).

== Geography ==
The town is situated in the northern part of the Arad Plateau, at a 29 km (18 mi) distance from the county seat, Arad. It is traversed by county roads DJ791 and DJ792C.

== Population ==
Historical population
Year	Pop.	±%
2002	12,936	—
2011	10,725	−17.1%
2021	12,460	+16.2%
Source: Census data

At the 2021 census, Sântana had a population of 12,460. At the census from 2011, the town had 10,725 inhabitants; of those, 84.89% were Romanians, 9.57% Roma, 3.14% Germans, 2.07% Hungarians, and 0.4% of other or undeclared nationalities. Furthermore, 79.6% were Romanian Orthodox, 11.5% Pentecostal, 5.5% Roman Catholic, and 1.2% Baptist.

== History ==
The first documentary record of the locality under the name Sântana goes back to the year 1828. The settlement is the result of the continuous development of Comlăuș, a locality mentioned already in 1334. Caporal Alexa was mentioned in 1334 when it was called Kerecton. Until 1926, it was called Cherechiu, which is still its colloquial name.

== Natives ==
- Ștefan Augustin Doinaș
- Adrian Drida
- Oskar Kaufmann

== Economy ==
Although the economy of the town is prevalent agricultural, the secondary and tertiary economic sectors have also developed recently. Sântana is an important centre of vineyards.

== Tourism ==
Its status as a significant road and railway junction can be used also for the promotion and improvement of the tourism. The specific architecture, the historical and architectural monuments as the "Convictului" building, the copyhold house and the fortifications called "Cetatea veche" are only a few of the locality's touristic sights.

== Gallery ==
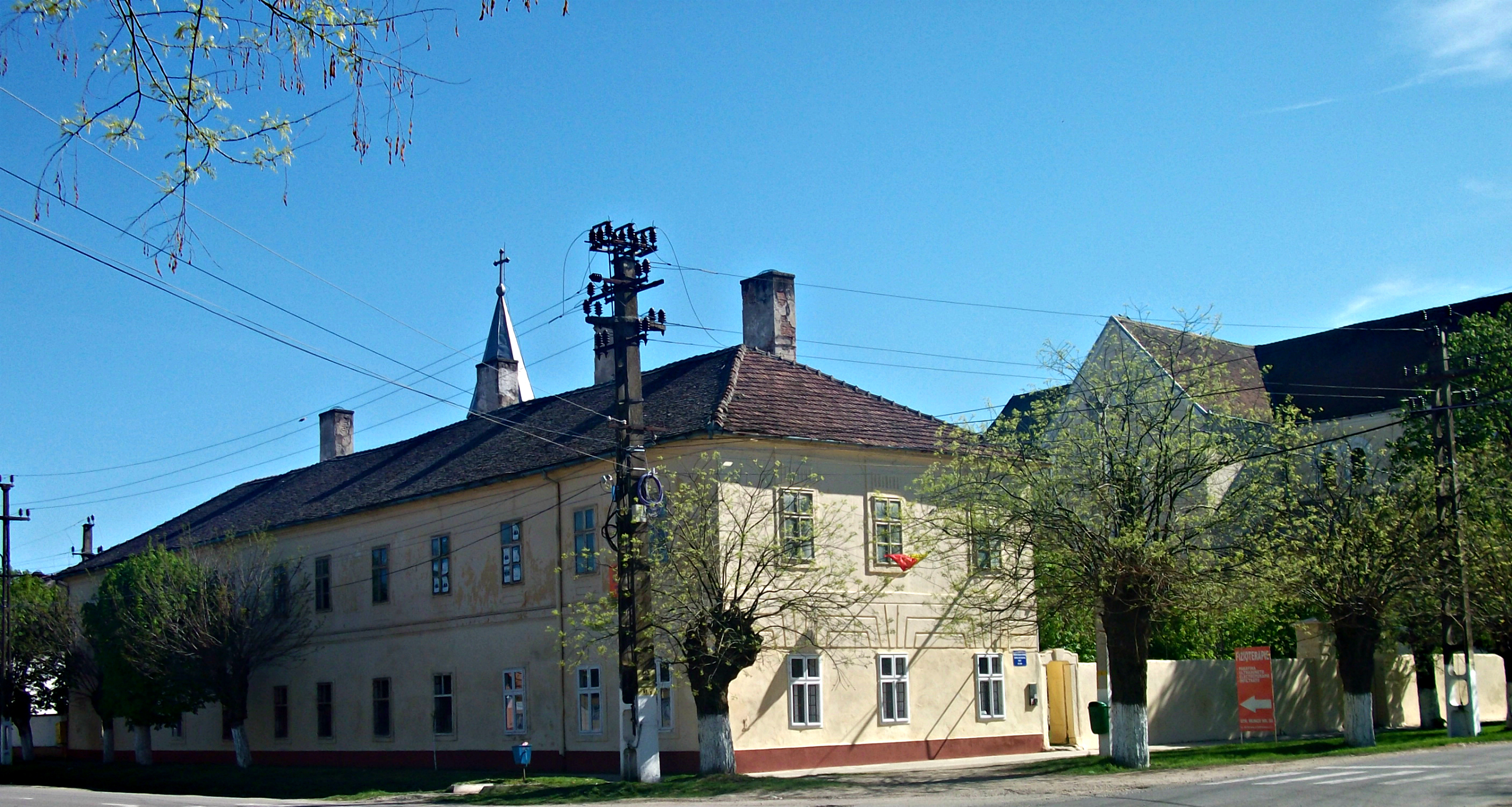
Urbarialhaus, 1749

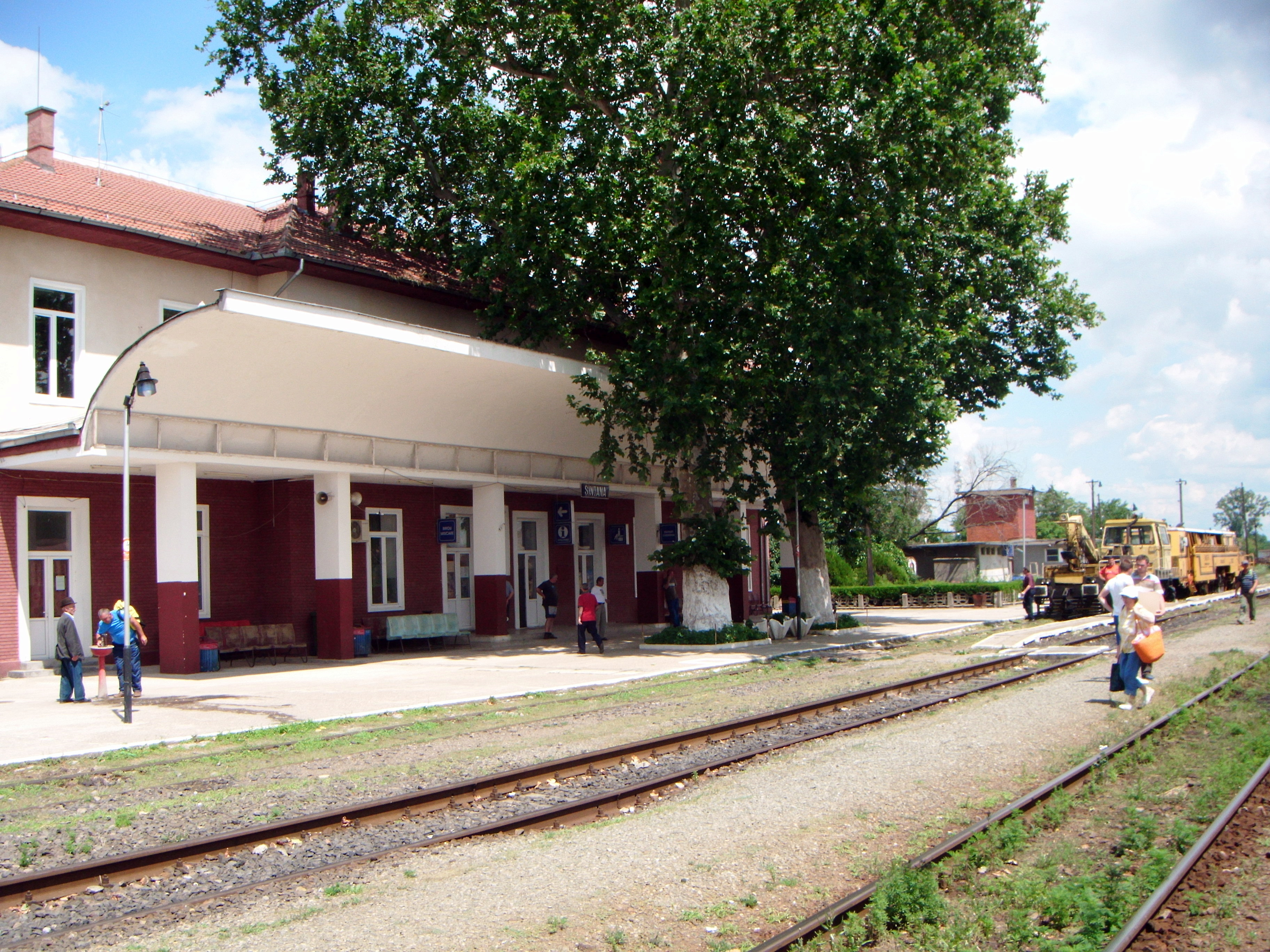
Sântana train station
