= Felix Milleker =

Serbian pedagogue and historiographer

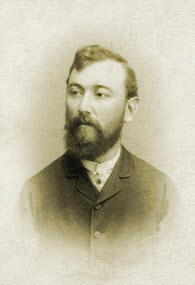

Felix Milleker (Serbian-Cyrillic: Феликс Милекер, Serbian-Latin: Feliks Mileker, Hungarian: Mileker Félix; pronounced Mileker Fehliksz; 14 January 1858 – 25 April 1942) was a Serbian pedagogue and historiographer of local history of Banat, who spent the most time of his life in his native region, named as Temes county, Torontalsko-Tamiške županja, Podunavske oblast and Danube banovina during several decades.

== Life and work ==
Felix Milleker was the son of a German smith's family in Vršac. He attended the primary school as well as the secondary school in his birth place and then he studied at pedagogical school of education in Szeged. In 1876, he graduated the qualification examination for teaching at primary schools and gained first professional experience at a school there. In 1878, he began teaching at a school in Bela Crkva, and then he changed to a school of Vršac, where he worked from 1883 to 1925 until retirement.

Milleker was interested in local history and culture and during leisure time that intellectual hobby became main emphasis of his social life. In 1894, he became appointed curator and first director of the City Museum of Vršac and Milleker sought and collected historical artifacts of regional history for creating a permanent exhibition at museum and he wrote numerous monographs on regional history in more than fifty years, many of it were published by him as editor-in-chief of the Banater Bücherei (German: Banat's Library).

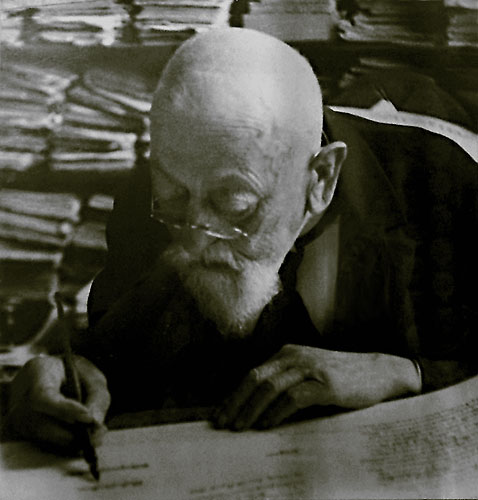
Milleker at work

Milleker's publications contain ideological attitudes of his time reflecting a shaken and uncertain identity of a contemporary German influenced by fundamental political changes of his present. An example is the matter of fact which can be found in his monograph on the history of the City of Pančevo from 1925. It includes a genesis of the oldest Catholic sacral building in town with incomplete architectural history and distorted chronology. In the work he made the drop of hint about an antijudaistic event in town which happened a few decades later in the same century. But the non-rational base of that event was already brief mentioned in his inaccurate history of sacral building. The motivation of that event was the disappearance of a female teenager and some Christian residents accused Jewish community being responsible. Among some prejudices against Hebrews was the allusion that they trying to defile Christian women (rape, human sacrifice) and Milleker used consciously or unconsciously a psychological metaphor in the history of the building – a not mentioned column with a statue of Abraham and Isaac (built in 1722) became the great mentioned steeple only (built in 1768) in his history. That historiographical work documents fateful opinions of German minority, based on Christianism and its Anti-Judaism, German and Hungarian nationalism (Austria-Hungary) and points of view of fundamental superiority of German culture.

In the same year of publishing the history of this city, he published a commemorative scripture which was commissioned, supported and funded by George Weifert . Content of publication is threatening Weifert's family history on occasion of his golden wedding, a happy marriage, unfortunately childless. That scripture is also clearly influenced by traditional German nationalism and most probably overseen in substantive focus by Weifert's nephew Adolf Gramberg, who was owner of Panĉevo brewery since 1911, and Milleker's financer. Weifert's political, economic and social merits in the Kingdom of Serbia are hardly mentioned, although he even was citizen of that state since 1872. Nevertheless, the City Museum of Vršac is an important and recognized institution of cultural heritage in southern part of Vojvodina in Serbia.

== Bibliography (selection) ==
- Die Besiedlung der Banater Militärgrenze (The Settlement of Banat Military Frontier), Bela Crkva 1926.
- Das Banat und die serbische Kultur (The Banat and Serbian Culture), Vršac 1938.
- Der Anfang der Einwanderung der Deutschen ins Banat, 1716-1722 (Starting of German Immigration into the Banat, 1716–1722), Vršac 1939.
- Das Hakenkreuz im Banat in den ältesten Zeiten (German: Hooks Cross in Banat in the Oldest Times), Vršac 1941.
