= István Mudin =

Hungarian athlete

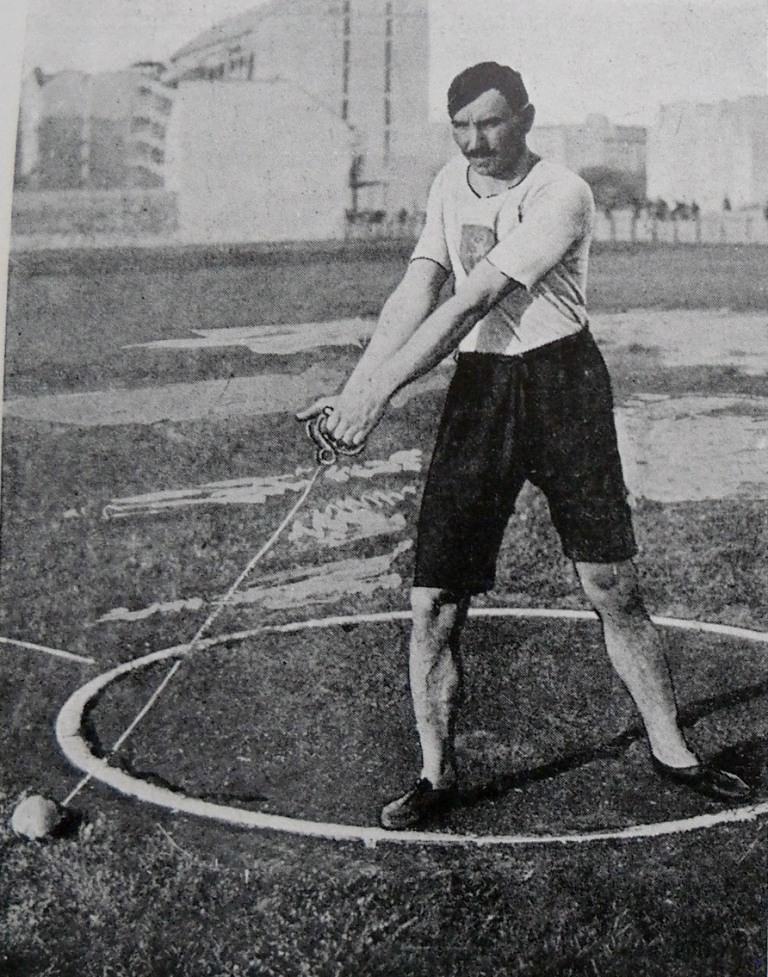
- Mudin c. 1911

Personal information
- Born: 16 October 1881 Kétegyháza, Kingdom of Hungary, Austria-Hungary
- Died: 22 July 1918 (aged 36) Kingdom of Italy

Sport
- Sport: Athletics
- Club: MAC, Budapest

Achievements and titles
- Personal best(s): SP – 13.97 m (1912); DT – 41.46 m (1910); HT – 39.70 m (1912); JT – 59.12 m (1913)
Medal record
Representing Hungary
Intercalated Games
Silver medal – second place	1906 Athens	Pentathlon
Bronze medal – third place	1906 Athens	Discus throw, Greek style

István Mudin (16 October 1881 – 22 July 1918) was a Hungarian athlete who competed at the 1906 Intercalated Games and the 1908 Summer Olympics. He competed in various throwing events and the pentathlon at the 1906 Intercalated Games and 1908 Summer Olympics and won two medals in 1906, in pentathlon and discus throw.

He was killed in action in Italy during World War I.

== See also ==
- List of Olympians killed in World War I
