= Vălcani =

- Commune
- Location in Timiș County

- Location in Romania
- Coordinates: 46°1′N 20°24′E
- Country: Romania
- County: Timiș

Government
  - Mayor (2008–): Dragoș-Ioan Buicu (Ind.)
- Area: 62.43 km^{2} (24.10 sq mi)
- Population (2021-12-01): 1,225
  - Density: 19.62/km^{2} (50.82/sq mi)
- Time zone: EET/EEST (UTC+2/+3)
- Postal code: 307153
- Vehicle reg.: TM
- Website: www.valcani.ro

Vălcani (often spelled Valcani; Hungarian: Valkány; German: Walkan; Serbian: Валкањ, romanized: Valkanj) is a commune in Timiș County, Romania. It is composed of a single village, Vălcani. An independent commune from 1877 to 1968, it was a village of Dudeștii Vechi commune from that year until 2005, when it again became independent.

== Geography ==
Vălcani is located in the west of Timiș County, in the Aranca Plain, on the border with Serbia. It is comprised between Dudeștii Vechi commune in the east and north and Teremia Mare commune in the south. It is located 82 km (51 mi) from Timișoara and about 20 km (12 mi) from Sânnicolau Mare, the nearest town.

The surface hydrographic network is represented by the Aranca River and the older branches of the Mureș River, Mureșan and Țiganca streams.

== History ==
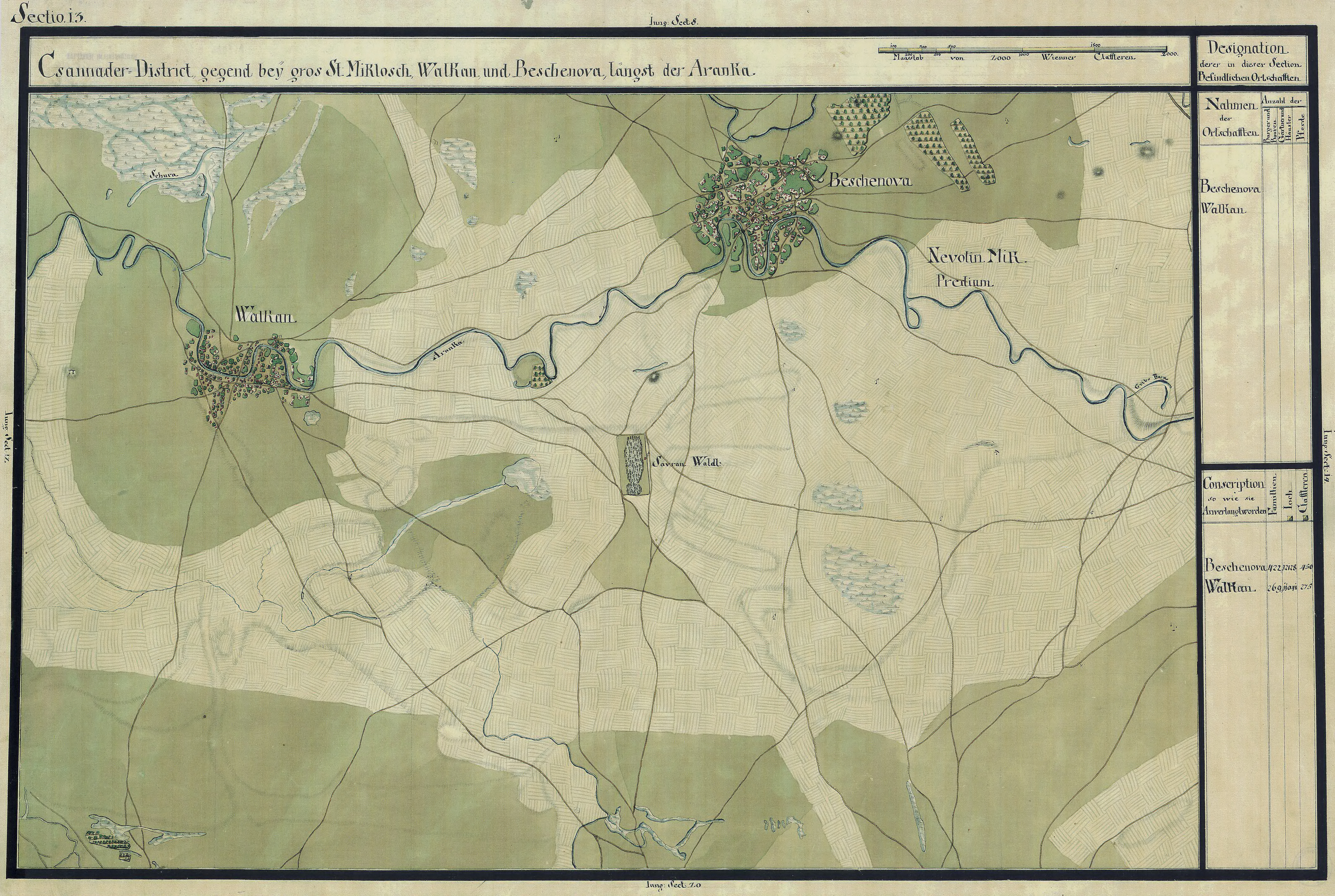
Vălcani (Walkan) on the Josephinische Landesaufnahme of 1769–1772

The first data about Valcani appear in documents from 1256, when it was called Kyuolkan, being inhabited by blaci (Romanians) and biseni (probably Pechenegs). It was first owned by the Csanád clan, in 1647 it was donated to János Horváth-Kissevics, and in 1717 it became the property of the Habsburg emperor. After the annexation of Banat by Hungary, the estate was sold to the Batthyány family, and in 1850 Simon Sinas became the owner. He later sold the property to several owners.

The first inhabitants settled in the part of the village known as Grădini ("Gardens"), about 300–400 m (980–1,310 ft) from the Aranca River, between Dudeștii Vechi and the current hearth of the village, being called Vălcaniul de Sus ("Upper Vălcani"). Later, as a result of the increase in the number of inhabitants, the population expanded downstream on Aranca, in the area known today as Șuștreni, being called Vălcaniul de Jos ("Lower Vălcani"). During the Ottoman rule, other neighborhoods appeared, such as Carafala.

The main occupation of the inhabitants was sheep breeding, but over time they began to cultivate the land. In 1736 the locality is divided in two, a part is ceded in order to colonize with Romanian population from Transylvania, Caraș and Severin, and a part is leased. At the beginning of the 20th century, the locality had 720 houses and 4,829 inhabitants, respectively.

Vălcani commune was first established in 1877 and functioned as an administrative unit until 1968, when it was abolished, being attached to Dudeștii Vechi commune. Following a local referendum held in 2004, Vălcani commune was re-established, consisting of a single village.

== Demographics ==
Ethnic composition (2021)
1. Romanians (93.9%)
2. Unknown (5.14%)
3. Others (0.99%)
Religious composition (2021)
1. Orthodox (90.4%)
2. Roman Catholics (1.87%)
3. Unknown (5.38%)
4. Others (2.39%)

Vălcani had a population of 1,225 inhabitants at the 2021 census, down 9.26% from the 2011 census. Most inhabitants are Romanians (93.87%). For 5.14% of the population, ethnicity is unknown. By religion, most inhabitants are Orthodox (90.36%), with a minority of Roman Catholics (1.87%). For 5.38% of the population, religious affiliation is unknown.

Census		Ethnic composition
Year	Population	Romanians	Hungarians	Germans	Serbs	Slovaks	Bulgarians
1880	3,549	2,635	766	128	4	7	–
1890	4,260	2,800	1,250	141	41	2	–
1900	4,829	3,105	1,532	135	50	6	–
1910	4,809	3,007	1,509	136	21	59	77
1920	3,276 (Note: Part of its territory was annexed to Yugoslavia.)	2,869	280	85	–	–	–
1930	3,429	2,643	591	81	49	8	25
1941	3,108	2,393	478	79	–	–	–
1956	2,205	–	–	–	–	–	–
1966	1,989	1,738	195	11	–	3	32
1977	1,731	1,539	149	10	1	–	11
1992	1,279	1,164	83	5	2	–	10
2002	1,308	1,217	56	3	7	–	19
2011	1,350	1,264	34	–	–	–	4
2021	1,225	1,150	6	–	–	–	4

== Politics and administration ==
The commune of Vălcani is administered by a mayor and a local council composed of 9 councilors. The mayor, Dragoș-Ioan Buicu, independent politician, has been in office since 2008. As from the 2024 local elections, the local council has the following composition by political parties:

Party	Seats	Composition
Social Democratic Party–National Liberal Party	5	
Alliance for the Union of Romanians	3	
Social Liberal Humanist Party	1	

== Infrastructure ==
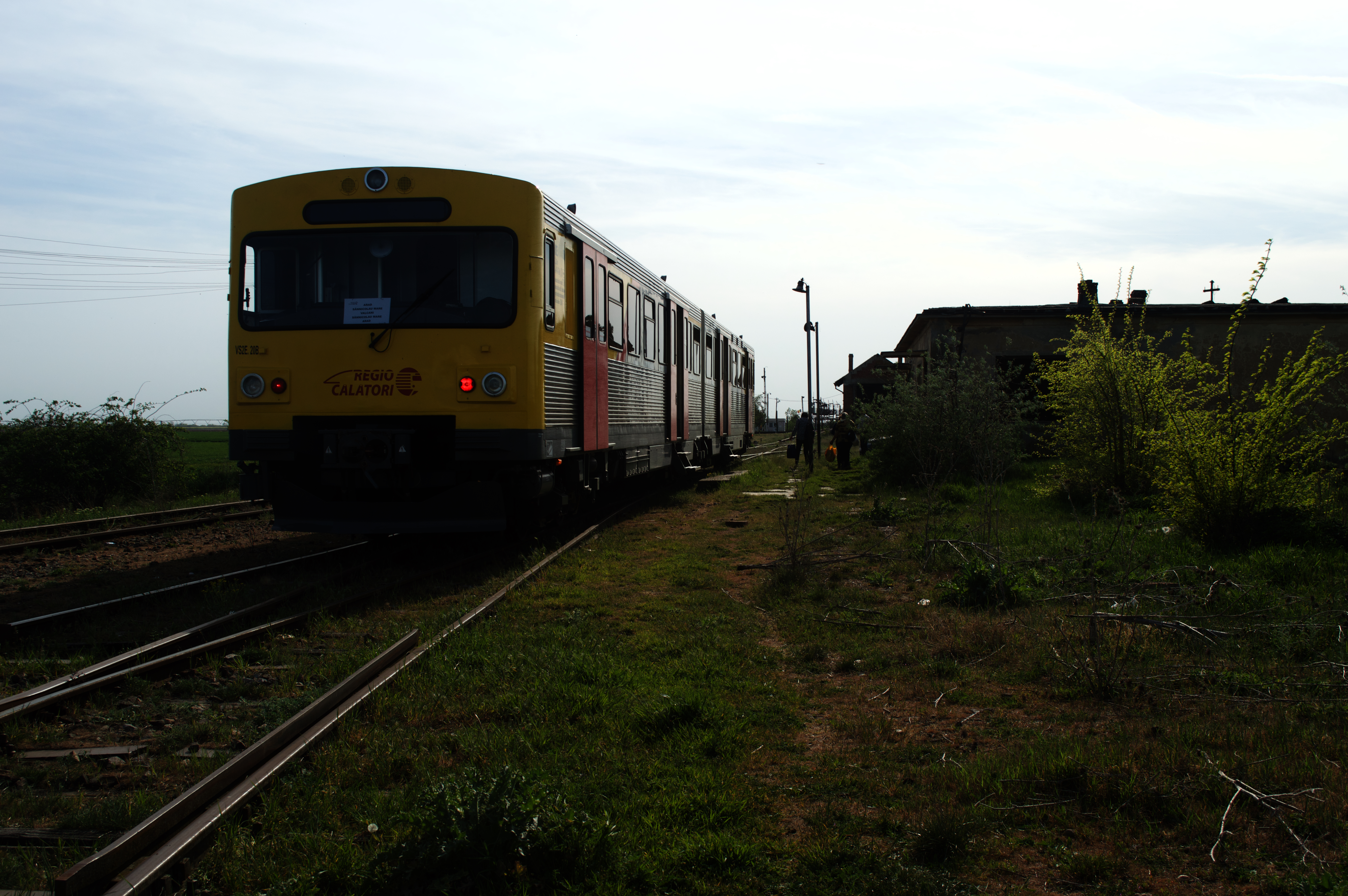
Former German, privately owned two-car DMU 609020 at Vălcani

Vălcani serves as the terminus of the Sânnicolau Mare–Vălcani railway line, which was inaugurated on 16 September 1870. Historically, this line connected to the main Szeged–Kikinda–Jimbolia–Timișoara route. Today, the railway is in a state of significant disrepair, with strict speed restrictions imposed. Despite this, two train pairs operate daily between Arad and Vălcani.

== Notable people ==
- Grațian Sepi (1910–1977), footballer
