= Căile Ferate Române Line 1000 =

Overview
- Locale: Prahova, Ilfov
- Stations: 7

Service
- Operator(s): Căile Ferate Române

Technical
- Line length: 59 km (37 mi)
- Number of tracks: 1
- Track gauge: 1,435 mm (4 ft 8 1/2 in) standard gauge
Route map

Line 1000 is one of CFR's main lines in Romania having a total of 59 km and passing through important cities like Bucharest, Buftea and Ploieşti.

== Secondary lines ==
- 1000 Bucharest (north) - Basarab - Buftea - Periș - Brazi - Ploieşti South - Ploieşti North (59 km).
