= Lőkösháza =

Village in Békés, Hungary

Coordinates: 46°26′N 21°14′E

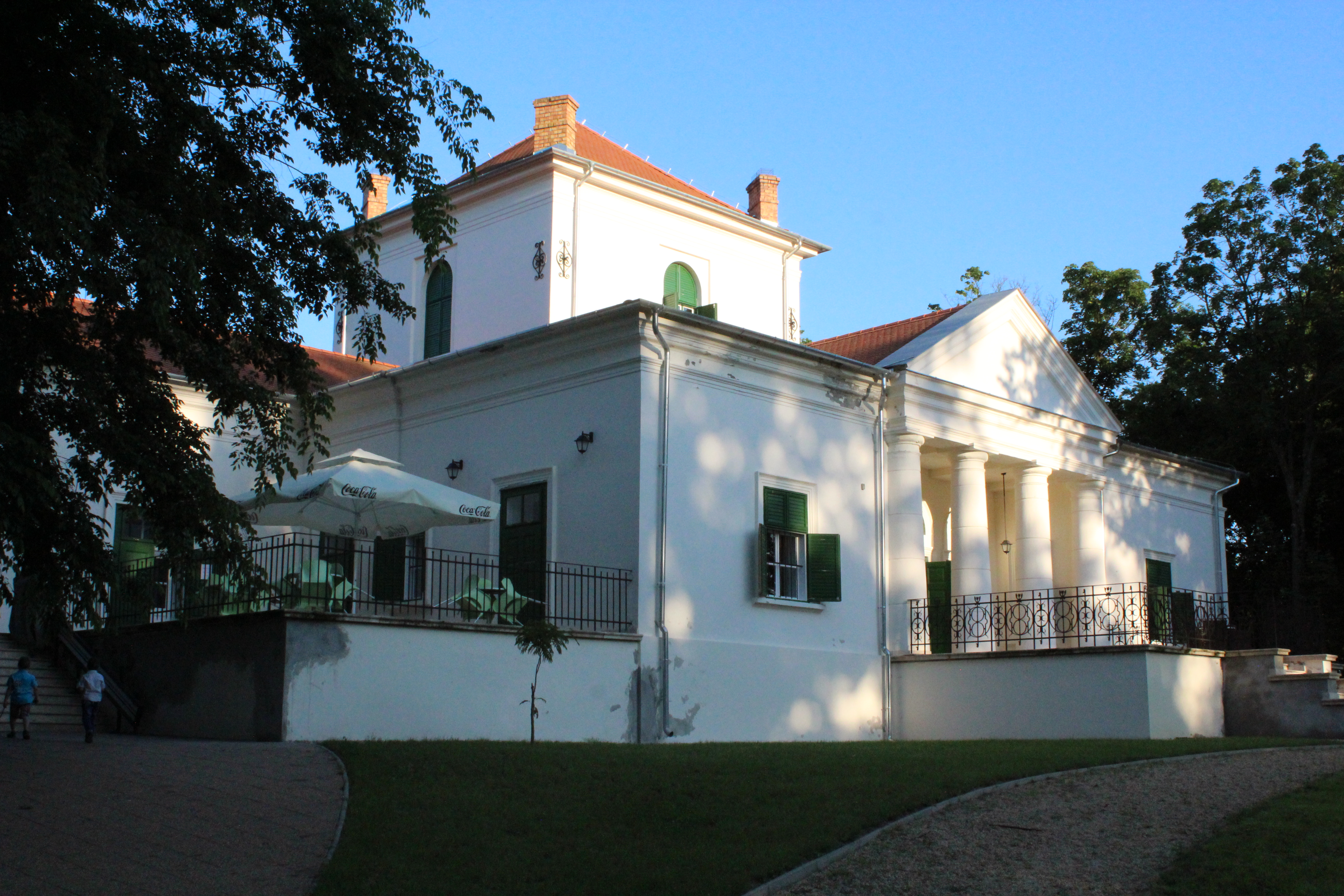
- The Vásárhelyi-Bréda Castle
- Interactive map of Lőkösháza
- Country: Hungary
- County: Békés

Area
  - Total: 52.05 km^{2} (20.10 sq mi)

Population (2015)
  - Total: 1,804
  - Density: 35/km^{2} (91/sq mi)
- Time zone: UTC+1 (CET)
  - Summer (DST): UTC+2 (CEST)
- Postal code: 5743
- Area code: 66

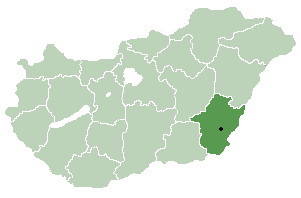
Location of Békés County in Hungary

Lőkösháza (Romanian: Leucușhaz, Lăcușhaz) is a village in Békés County, in the Southern Great Plain region of southeast Hungary.

== Geography ==
It covers an area of 52.05 km^{2} (20 sq mi) and has a population of 1804 (2015).

An important railway line crosses the Hungarian-Romanian border here (the Budapest–Szolnok–Békéscsaba–Lőkösháza–Arad–Bucharest–Sofia–Istanbul line).
