= Battle of Temesvár =

1849 battle during the Hungarian Revolution

Coordinates: 45°49′51.8″N 21°09′29.6″E

- Part of the Hungarian Revolution of 1848
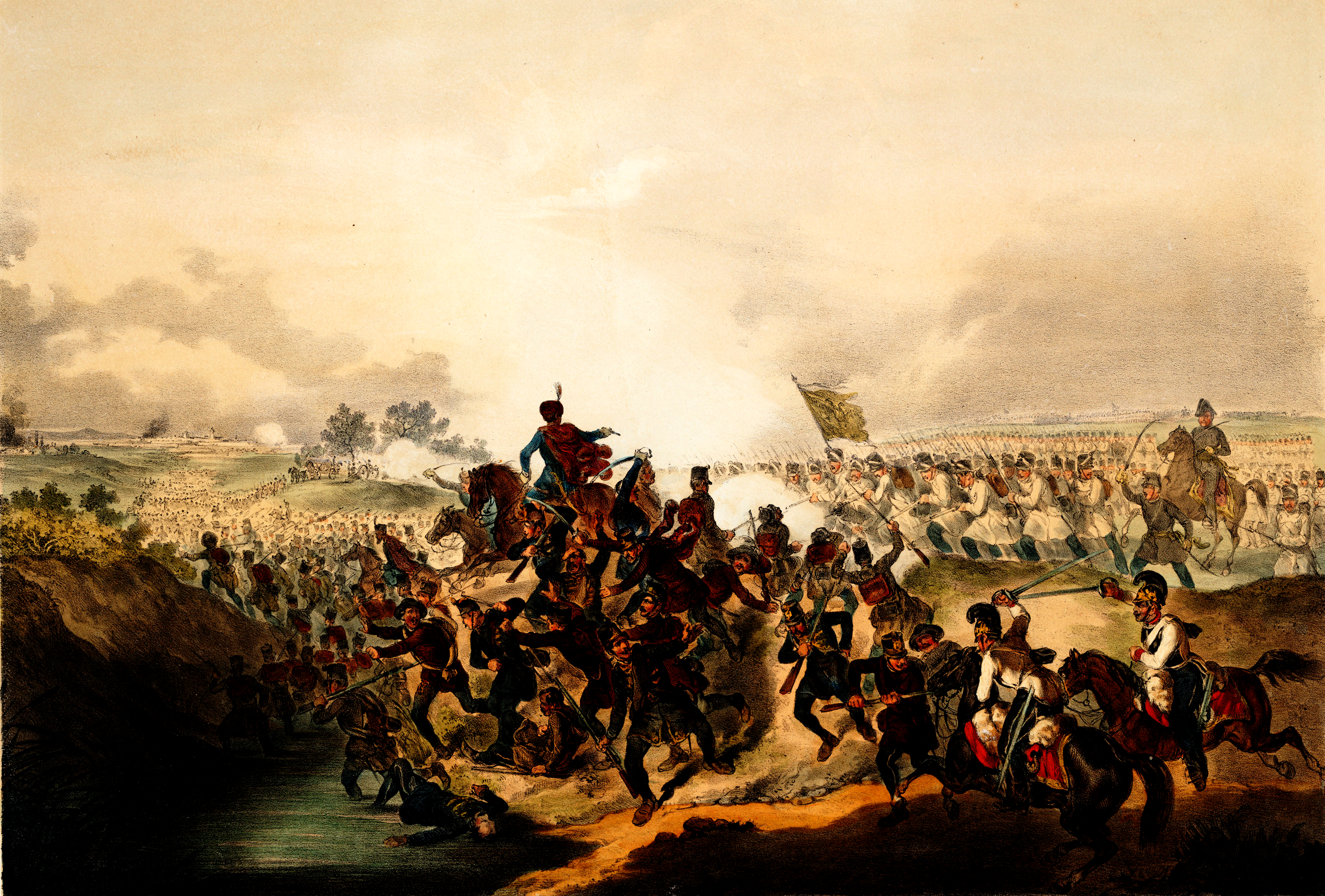
- Battle of Temesvar by Josef Lanzedelly
Date	9 August 1849
Location	around Temesvár, Kingdom of Hungary (today Timișoara, Romania)
Result	Austro-Russian victory

Belligerents
Hungarian Revolutionary Army: Polish Legion; Italian volunteers	Austrian Empire; Russian Empire

Commanders and leaders
Józef Bem (WIA); Mór Perczel; György Kmety; Arisztid Dessewffy; Charles de Schwartzenberg (POW)	Julius Jacob von Haynau; Prince Franz de Paula of Liechtenstein; Feodor Sergeyevich Panyutyin

Strength
Total: 42,692 men: IV. corps: 12,708; IX. corps: 6,690; X. corps: 12,241; Cavalry: 1,850; Polish legion: 1,200; Kmety corps: 8,003; 187 cannons Did not participate: - V. corps: 10,101; 30 cannons	Total: 34,000: III. corps: 8,600; Reserve corps: 9,600; 9. combined Russian division of Fyodor Panyutyin; Cavalry division: 2,800; 192 cannons Did not participate: I. corps: 9,000; garrison of Temesvár: 3,900; 261 cannons

Casualties and losses
6,300–15,500 men: 300–500 dead; 6,000 – 15,000 missing or captured	208 men: 36 dead; 153 wounded

The Battle of Temesvár (now Timișoara, Romania) was a key battle in the Hungarian Revolution of 1848, fought on 9 August 1849 between the Austrian Empire, led by Field Marshal Julius Jacob von Haynau, and the Hungarian Revolutionary Army (supplemented by Polish volunteers), led by Lieutenant General Józef Bem. Hungarian forces under Bem, together with siege corps led by Major General Károly Vécsey, totalled 55,000 soldiers. Austrian forces under Haynau totalled 38,000 soldiers, although their numerical disadvantage was mitigated by superior artillery. The battle resulted in an Austrian victory and was the decisive engagement of the war, which ended in defeat for the Hungarians.

After the Hungarian defeat at the Battle of Szőreg, Lieutenant General Henryk Dembiński led his Hungarian troops to Temesvár and was about to give the order to retreat toward Lugos when Lieutenant General Józef Bem arrived at the camp with an order from Governor Lajos Kossuth to replace Dembiński. Bem wanted to march toward Arad, but changed his mind on hearing that the Austrian army led by Haynau was nearby. He gave an order to attack, hoping to boost the morale of his demoralized army with a victory.

The battle started well for the Hungarians, with Bem repulsing Haynau's initial attack. However, Vécsey's siege corps ran out of artillery ammunition early on, as Dembiński had previously sent it ahead to Lugos and failed to inform Bem. The Polish general still hoped to win the battle and rode with the first line of his troops, but suffered a serious injury when he fell from his horse, resulting in his removal from the battlefield and further demoralization of the Hungarian troops. During a retreat, panic broke out among the Hungarian rookies and spread to the whole army, causing a rout. The Austrians took 6,000–7,000 prisoners and only about 20,000–30,000 men from the Hungarian army could be regathered at Lugos.

The defeat prevented the Hungarian main army from joining together with the Army of the Upper Danube (under General Artúr Görgei), which had been the last hope of Kossuth and Görgei for continuing the resistance. When he heard about the defeat, Kossuth resigned. In order to avoid further bloodshed, the Hungarian council of war decided on 11 August to surrender to Russian troops (which had entered the conflict on the side of the Austrians). On 13 August, Görgei signed official terms of surrender at Világos (now Șiria, Romania), ending the revolution.

== Background ==
After his defeat at the Battle of Szőreg on 5 August 1849, the Hungarian government ordered Lieutenant General Henryk Dembiński to march toward Arad to join his troops with the Army of the Upper Danube led by General Artúr Görgei, after which they would be able to fight a decisive battle against the army of Field Marshal Julius Jacob von Haynau. However, Dembiński, on the basis that he wished to join together with Major General Vécsey's siege corps and a division under the command of General György Kmety, instead marched from Óbesenyő toward Temesvár.

Haynau realised that Dembiński was cutting himself from Görgei's troops and started to pursue him, preventing the two Hungarian armies from joining together. He hoped to defeat Dembiński decisively before the Russian main army arrived, enabling him to claim victory over the Hungarians solely for the Austrian army; there was a degree of shame felt by the Austrians that they had been forced to ask for outside help in order to put down an insurrection in their own state. To be sure of victory, he deposed Lieutenant General Philipp von Bechtold, whom he accused of lack of determination in the third battle of Komárom and the Battle of Szőreg, from the leadership of the cavalry division, replacing him with Lieutenant Field Marshal Karl von Wallmoden-Gimborn.

On 6 August, the Austrian Reserve Corps advanced to Zombor, establishing a connection with the I. corps at Makó. The Russian Panyutyin division advanced to Klárafalva, the Wallmoden division to Keresztúr and Porgány, and the III. corps marched to Óbesenyő, where they entered in battle with the Hungarian cavalry of Dembiński's army led by Major General Arisztid Dessewffy. Dessewffy attacked in order to give time for Dembiński's army to retreat. After the commander of the Austrian III. corps Lieutenant General Georg von Ramberg repulsed him, he joined the retreating Hungarian army at Bánátkomlós. During the retreat, Dessewffy stopped and tried again to hold back Ramberg's troops, but he was defeated at Kisteremia, leading to the capture of 700 soldiers by the Austrians.

On 6 August, Dembiński ordered Kmety to march with his division to Zsombolya. He believed that the Austrian troops were advancing toward Csatád, and the intention was that Kmety would engage them with a flanking maneuver during the following night. Although he received a letter from Minister of War Lajos Aulich and Governor Kossuth ordering him to march toward Arad, he ignored it; on 8 August, he continued to march toward Temesvár through Kisbecskerek. He was hoping to rendezvous with the siege corps of Vécsey, after which they would continue to retreat to Transylvania and join together with Görgei.

On 7 August, the bulk of the Austrian I. corps, led by General Franz Schlik, crossed the Maros river and advanced to Ráccsanád and Németcsanád. The Reserve corps advanced from Zombor to Nagyszentmiklós, the Wallmoden cavalry division to Valkány and Mokrin, the Panyutyin division to Óbesenyő, while the III. corps remained at Kisteremia. On the same day, Haynau learned about the defeat of Austrian siege corps at Komárom by Hungarian forces under the command of General György Klapka, which endangered his supply and communication lines with Vienna. Although displeased by this news, he decided to continue his operations against Dembiński, hoping that the Austrian corps chased away from Komárom could count on the II. reserve corps stationed at Székesfehérvár (although these troops were bogged down by the successful revolt of the city from 10 August) and other reserve corps from the valley of the Morava river, led by Lieutenant General Johann Nobili. In order to help them, he sent the Jablonowski brigade from Szeged to Pest.

On 8 August, the I. corps advanced to Rácszentpéter, the Sartori brigade through Nagylak to Sajtény, the Reserve corps to Pészak, the III. corps to Grabác and Zsombolya, the Panyutyin division to Lovrin, while the Wallmoden cavalry division had to push forward toward Grabác and Csatád. Here, the Simbschen and Lederer brigades of Wallmoden's division entered in battle with the Hungarian cavalry, and after a long and heavy fight they chased them to Nagyjécsa, the Austrians suffering losses of sixteen men and twenty-five horses, in addition to sixteen wounded, while the Hungarians suffered sixty-seventy total casualties, as well as the capture of a cannon and ammunition wagon. On the same day, the Hungarian army retreated to Kisbecskerek, where they joined with the Kmety division.

== Prelude ==
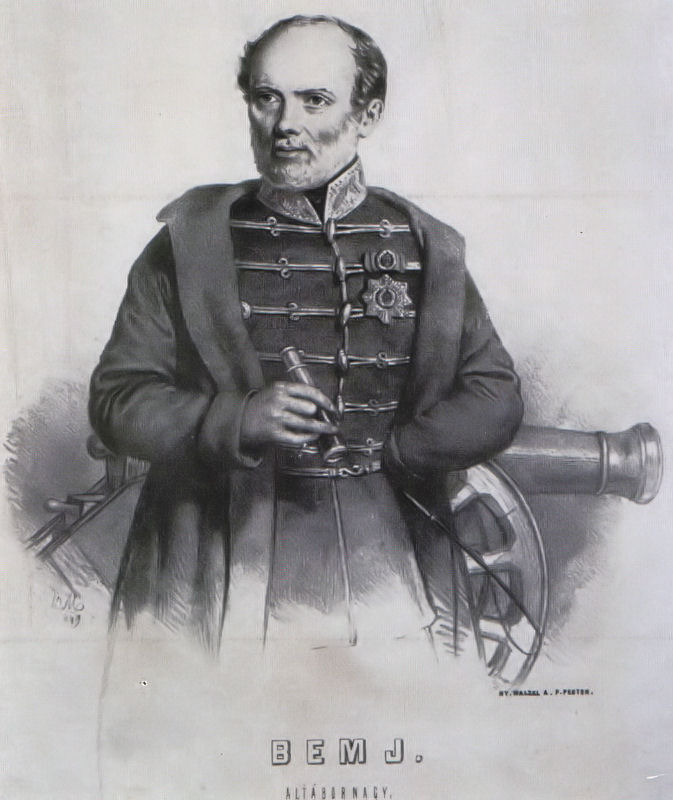
József Bem, Hungarian supreme commander

Because Dembiński ignored his orders to march north to Arad, Kossuth relieved him from command and named another Polish general, Lieutenant General Józef Bem, as supreme commander. He had been the leader of Hungarian troops from Transylvania, and had earned a strong reputation through multiple victories against both Austrian and Russian troops.

On 8 August, while heading toward Temesvár, Bem met with the officers of the retreating Hungarian army at Rékás, who told him that their troops were demoralized due to their continuous retreat. General Mór Perczel stated that he considered it very important for the army to enter in battle with the Austrians. On the morning of 9 August, at Temesvár, Dembiński was about to give the order to retreat toward Lugos when Bem arrived at the camp and took over command. Bem wanted to lead the Hungarian army to Arad, but before that he hoped to successfully engage the Austrians in order to boost the morale of the Hungarians, although he was hoping for a small skirmish rather than a full scale battle. Despite Dembiński's objections, he ordered his troops to prepare for battle.

The deployment of the Hungarian army was not very good. At Kisbecskerek, where the probability of a major Austrian attack was high, only a couple of companies and four cannons were positioned. The newly joined Kmety division was on the left flank at Szakállháza, northeast from them was positioned the X. corps led by Colonel László Gál. Next to them, the center was occupied by the IV. corps led by Richard Guyon. The right flank was represented by the IX. corps led by Major General Arisztid Dessewffy. Part of the center and right wing were stationed in the Csóka and Vadász forests. The fortress of Temesvár was surrounded by the V. corps, led by Major General Károly Vécsey, from which Bem had transferred a couple of infantry battalions to Guyon's IV. corps.

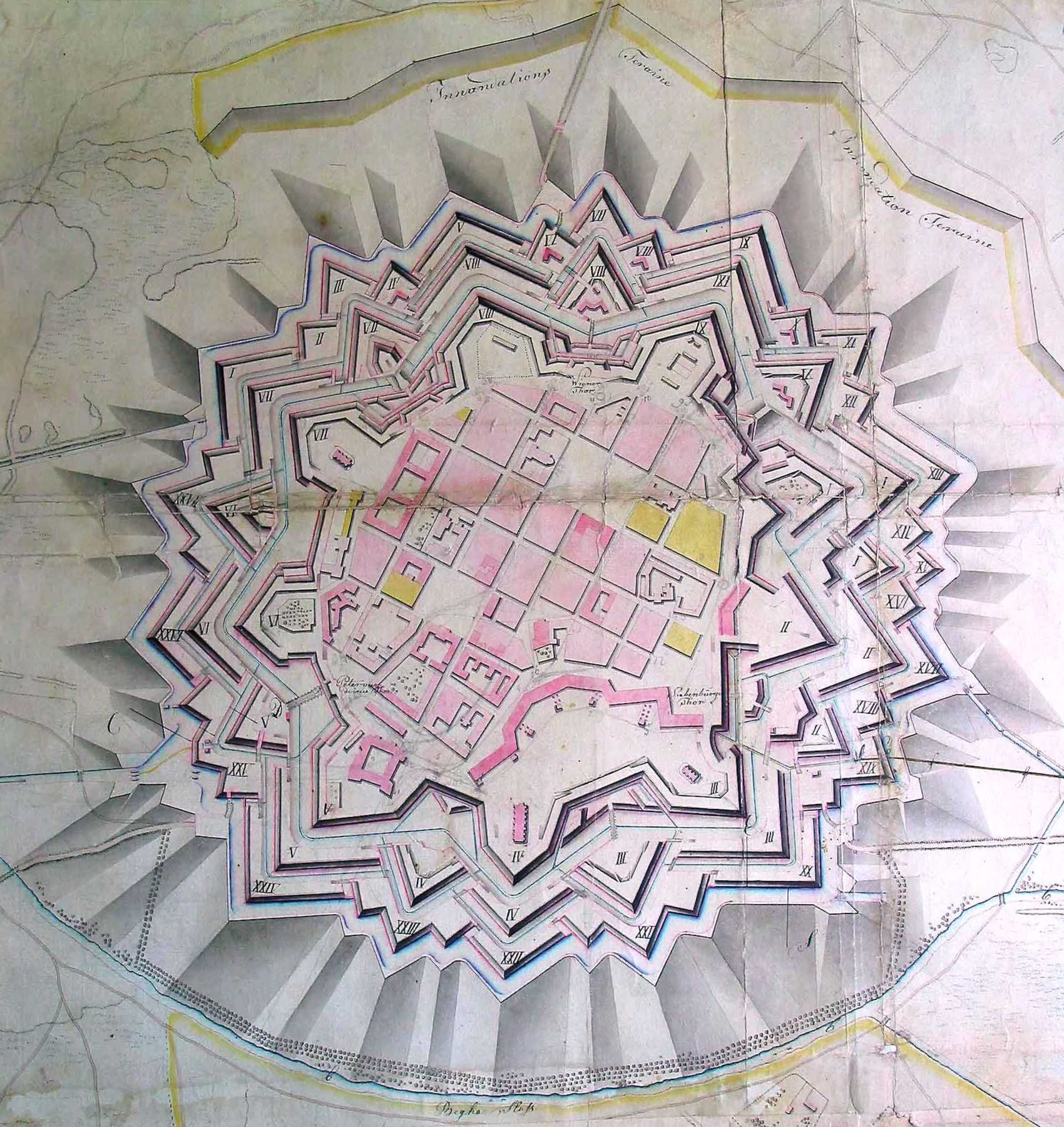
A map of Temesvár fortress from 1808

Bem noticed that a retreat of the Hungarian army would be impossible in the case of defeat, due to the fact that all the retreat roads toward Lugos led to the fortress of Temesvár, which was held by an Austrian garrison. In order to resolve this problem, Bem ordered the troops in this region to advance across the Beregszó creek, which flowed east–west between Szakállháza and the Csóka and Vadász-forests, and to take position on the line of the Nyárád creek which flowed from Szakállháza into the Beregszó. His plan was to hold the line of the Nyárád creek, repulsing an eventual Austrian attack with cannons, while the Kmety division positioned at Szakállháza attacked the Austrian right flank. Relying on scout reports, Bem thought that the Austrians were unprepared for a full scale battle, so he hoped that he would be able to retreat his troops toward Arad, while Kmety's division and his artillery held back the Austrian troops.

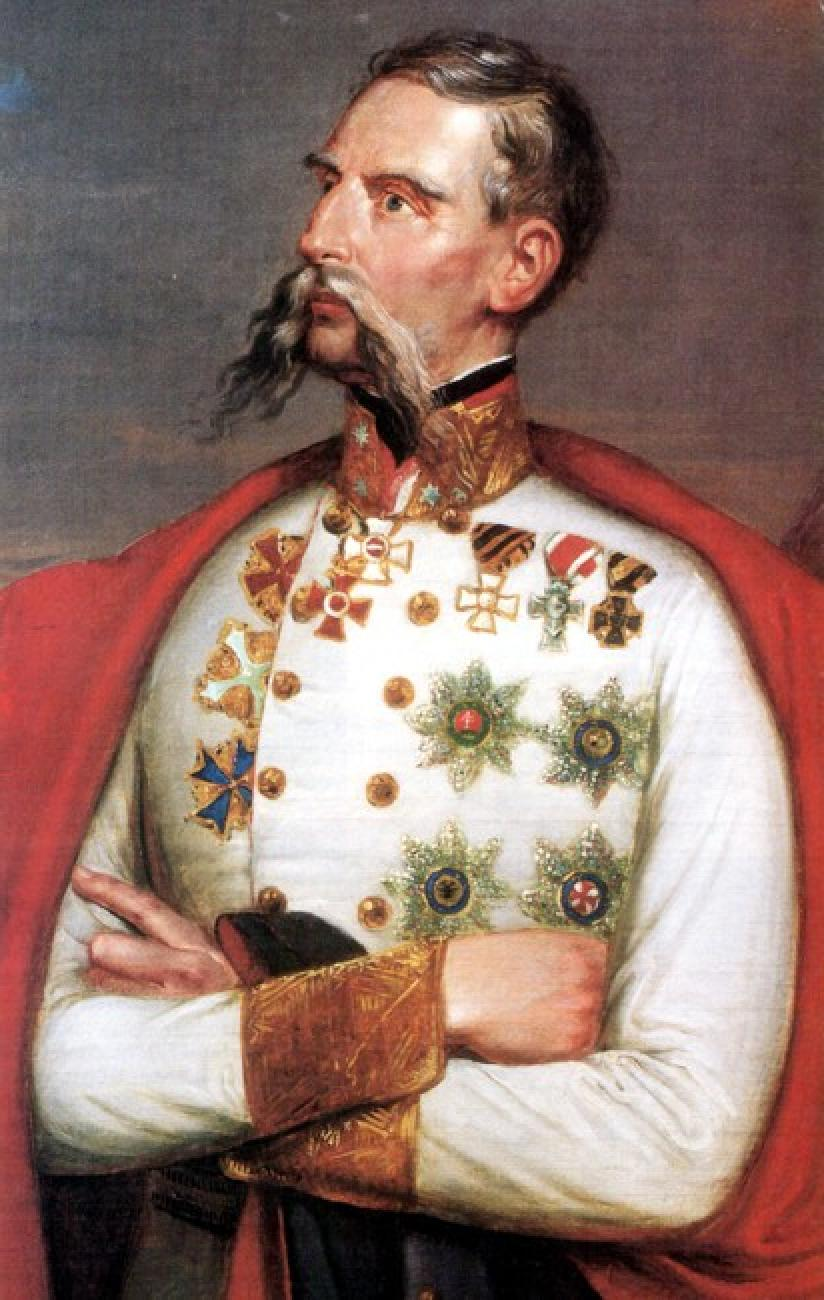
Field Marshall Julius Jacob von Haynau, commander of the Austrian forces

Haynau did not expected a battle on this day, and wanted to concentrate his troops at Kisbecskerek, expecting to meet resistance and engage his enemy on 10 August. He ordered the I. corps (fourteen infantry battalions, eleven cavalry companies, forty-eight cannons) to march from Rácszentpéter to Vinga in order to cut-off access via the Arad–Temesvár road, and to isolate the fortress of Arad from the left bank of the Maros. Simultaneously, he ordered a brigade led by Colonel Sartori to march along the right bank of the river to Magyarfalva, then to Pécska to keep an eye on the Arad fortress and Görgei's troops. The Reserve Corps (eleven infantry battalions, eight cavalry companies, fifty-four cannons) led by Franz Liechtenstein were ordered to occupy Hodony and send a vanguard to Mercifalva.

Panyutyin's Russian division (sixteen infantry battalions, two cavalry companies, forty-eight cannons) took position at Kisbecskerek, the bulk of the III. corps (ten infantry battalions, 6 cavalry companies, 36 cannons) led by Ramberg took position between Kisbecskere and the Nyárád creek, while the right wing of the same corps had to march from Zsombolya through Gyertyámos to Szakállháza. The cavalry division led by Wallmoden (twenty-eight cavalry companies, eighteen cannons), the vanguard of the III. corps, was ordered to do a reconnaissance-in-force toward Temesvár.

=== Opposing forces ===
The Hungarian army
Commander in chief: Lieutenant General Józef Bem;
- IV. corps (commander General Richard Guyon): 12,000 soldiers, 51 cannons;
- IX. corps (commander General Arisztid Dessewffy): 16,000 soldiers, 38 cannons;
- X. corps (commander Colonel László Gaál): 12,000 soldiers, 27 cannons;
- 15. division (commander General György Kmety): 6600 soldiers, 16 cannons;
Total: 46,600 soldiers, 132 cannons
Did not participate:
- V. corps (commander General Károly Vécsey): 10,500 soldiers, 30 cannons.

The Austrian army
Commander in chief: Field Marshal Julius Jacob von Haynau;
- III. corps (commander Lieutenant General Georg von Ramberg): 8600 soldiers, 36 cannons;
- IV. (Reserve) corps (commander Lieutenant General Franz von Liechtenstein): 8600 soldiers, 36 cannons;
- 9. Russian Combined Infantry Division (Lieutenant General Fyodor Sergeyevich Panyutyin): 13,000 soldiers, 48 cannons;
- Cavalry division (Lieutenant General Ludwig Wallmoden-Gimborn): 2800 soldiers, 18 cannons;
- Artillery reserve: 36 cannons;
Total: 34,000 soldiers, 192 cannons
Did not participate:
- I. corps (commander Lieutenant General Franz Schlik): 9000 soldiers, 48 cannons;
- Temesvár garrison (Lieutenant General Georg Rukawina): 3900 soldiers, 213 cannons.

== Battle ==
At 4 a.m., the Wallmoden cavalry division departed from Nagyjécsa, and around 8:30 a.m., stumbled upon the Hungarian rearguard (six–eight cavalry companies and four cannons) north of Kisbecskerek. Wallmoden organized two lines, placing his hussars (a type of light cavalry) on the front and his heavy cavalry on the second line, and sent his batteries forward toward Kisbecskerek. After the Austrian batteries opened fire, the Hungarian cannons and hussars retreated to Kisbecskerek, the latter preparing to attack the Austrian cavalry should they attempt to cross the creek. Seeing this, Wallmoden sent the Simschen brigade with the Emperor Ferdinand Uhlan Regiment (another type of light cavalry), along with two other cavalry regiments and a Congreve rocket battery, to cross the Aranka river and head north through Újbesenyő to Kisbecskerek. At the same time, he ordered the remaining part of the Lederer brigade to attack Kisbecskerek from the front. The Hungarians noticed Wallmoden's flanking maneuver, and retreated behind the Nyárád creek.

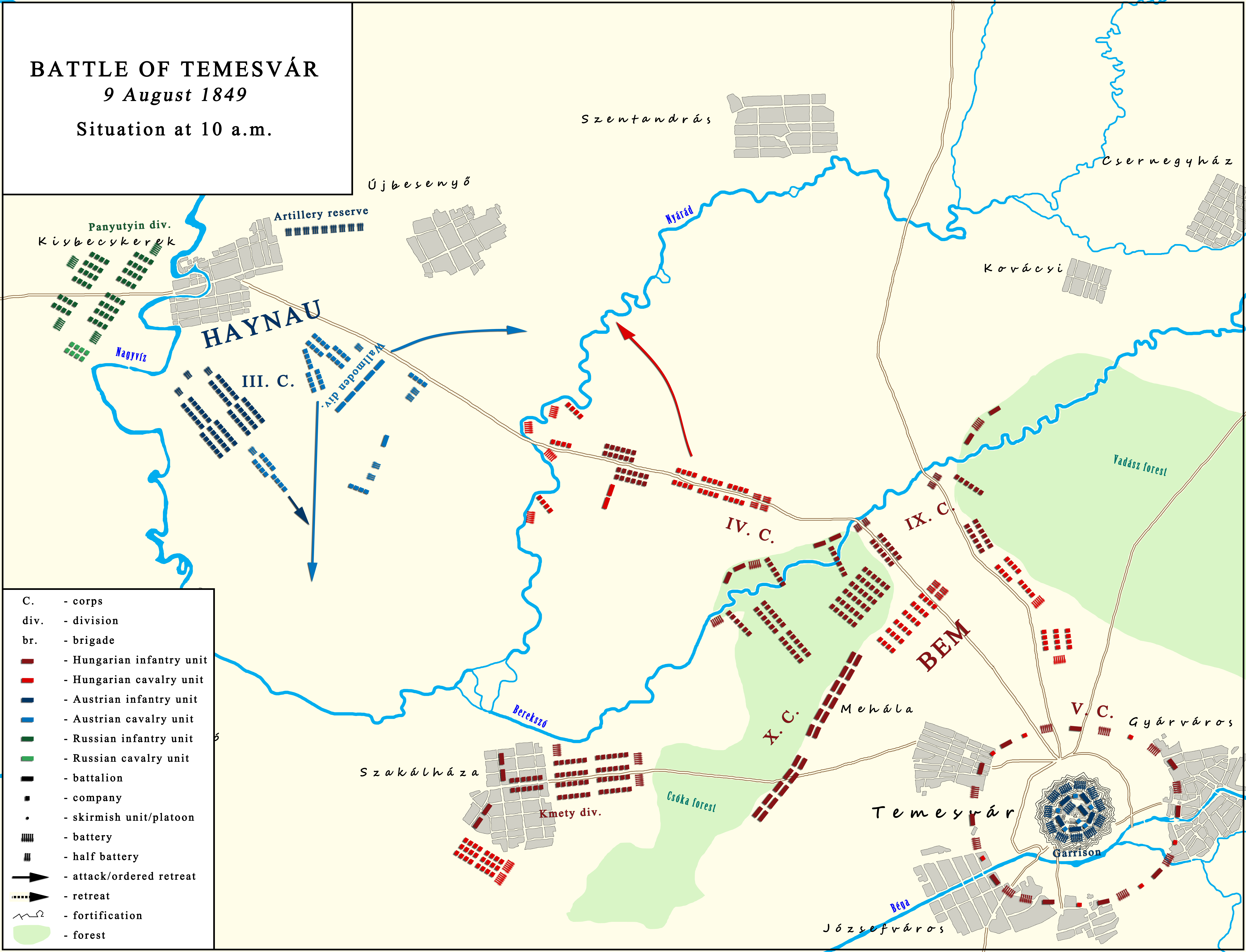
The battle of Temesvár (9 August 1849). The situation around 10 am

The III. corps, which departed from Nagyjécsa at 5 a.m., now arrived at the battlefield and started its deployment. Ramberg sent the Fiquelmont Dragoon Regiment to support Wallmoden's right wing, and ordered his infantry to cross the Aranka river and take position on the far side. The Wolf brigade was stationed on the right wing and the Dossen brigade on the left, while the Weigl cavalry brigade deployed to the right of them. When the Hungarian troops around Kisbecskerek retreated behind the Nyárád, around 10 a.m., it seemed that the battle had ended for that day, and Simbschen was ordered to move from Újbesenyő to the road heading to Temesvár, in order to keep an eye on the siege troops which had encircled the fortress.

When Haynau, together with the Panyutyin division and the ammunition reserve, arrived at 10 a.m. at Kisbecskerek, he ordered the cavalry division and to the III. corps to advance further. When a Hungarian battery from the other bank of the Nyárád prevented this, Haynau sent two batteries along the Temesvár road and another two batteries 2700 paces to the right of the Nyárád creek in echelon formation, hoping to unleash a crossfire against his enemy.

Bem, unlike the defensive Dembiński, was an offensive general, and instead of retreating, responded to Haynau's movements by sending more batteries to support his artillery and a couple of cavalry units to defend them. He sent either two or three battalions of infantry to a tavern, which was situated along the main road, and ordered the rest of his army to advance from the Csóka and Vadász forests and deploy along the main road. Bem positioned the X. corps (led by Colonel László Gál) along the main road, to the right of the IV. corps (led by General Guyon). These were reinforced by a couple of battalions and batteries borrowed from Vécsey's siege corps. Vécsey himself remained close to Temesvár in order to keep an eye on the defenders. The newly formed recruit battalions, which had no firearms, were sent toward Arad.

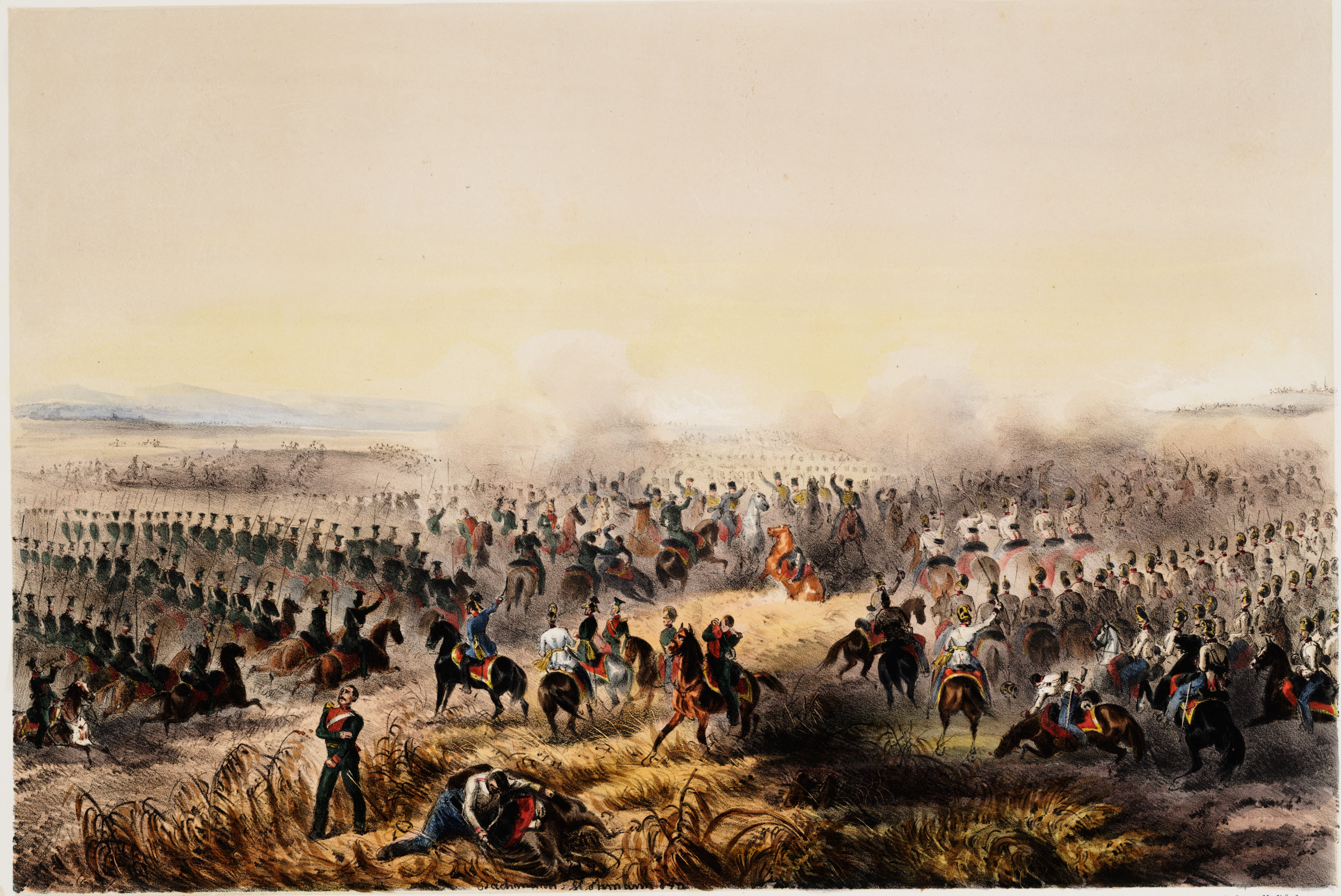
B. Bachmann-Hohmannː Die Schlacht bei Temesvár (The battle of Temesvár)

Haynau saw that the Hungarians were bringing more and more batteries to the Nyárád line, which he interpreted as an invitation to fight. He ordered his troops to advance, sending two twelve pounder batteries east along the main road to Temesvár, which placed them forward of the earlier installed batteries along the riverbank. He also ordered the Panyutyin division and the Simbschen brigade to advance toward Újbesenyő. As a response to this, Bem sent six Hussar companies and a battery to attack the batteries on the Austrian left flank, which caused them to retreat and put the advancing Russian infantry into disarray. In order to resolve this problem, Haynau sent the Simbschen brigade (of ten cavalry companies) and a battery, reinforced by four cuirassier (heavy cavalry) companies of the Emperor Ferdinand regiment, to repulse the numerically inferior Hussars. At the same time, Haynau ordered Lieutenant General Franz von Liechtenstein to march with the reserve corps to Szentandrás and attack the Hungarian right flank.

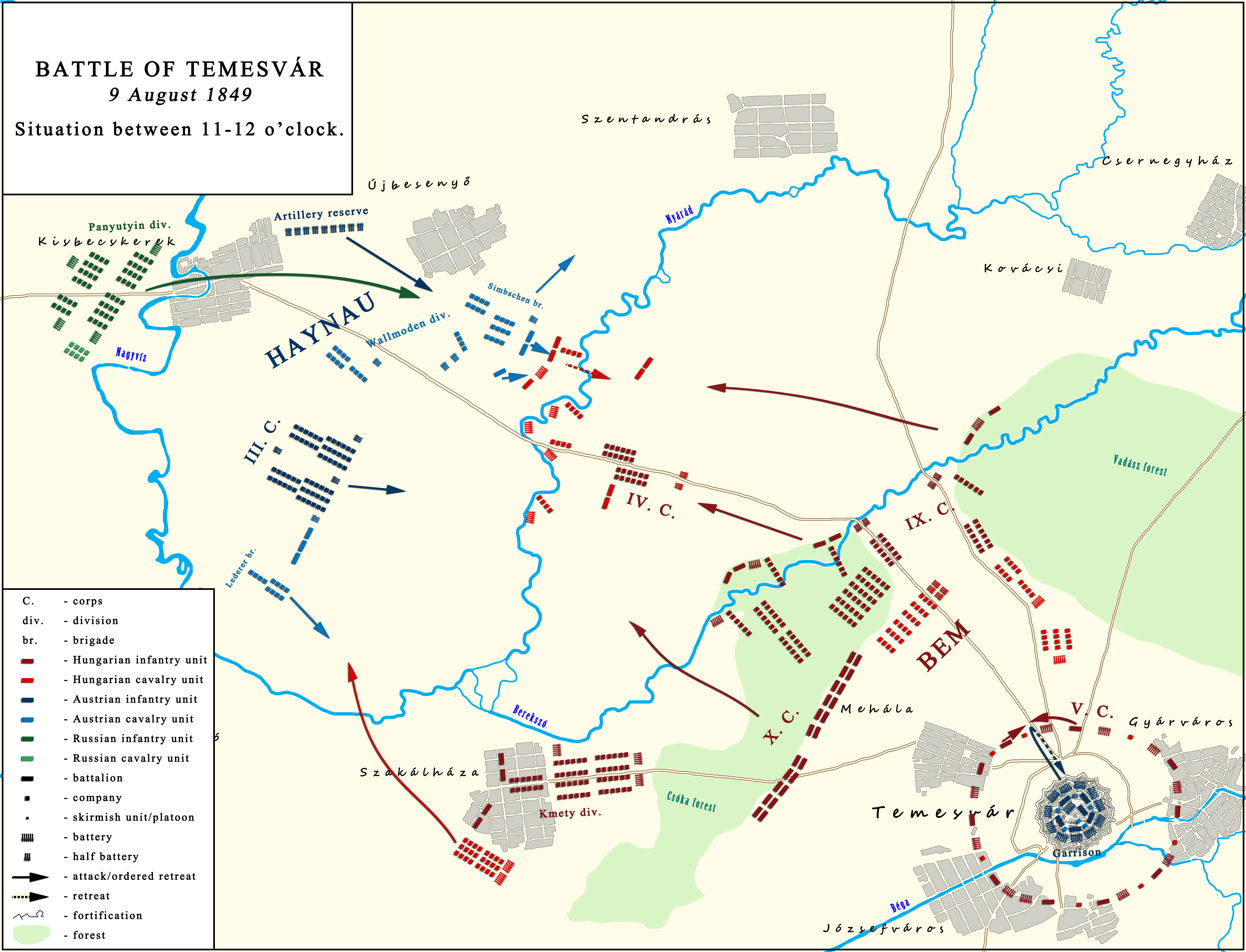
The battle of Temesvár (9 August 1849). The situation between 11-12 o'clock

In the meantime, at approximately 3 p.m., the garrison at Temesvár heard the cannonade from the northwest. Believing the Austrian relief army to be near, the commander of the fortress, Lieutenant General Baron Juraj Rukavina Vidovgradski ordered Colonel Blomberg to make a sortie through the Vienna gate against the besieging forces, with six companies of Schwarzenberg uhlans, two companies of Sivkovics, two companies of Rukavina infantry, one rifle squad, and a six pounder battery. Initially, Blomberg managed to break the defense line of the besiegers, but Vécsey quickly sent reinforcements, which pushed his troops back into the fortress.

Around 4 p.m., Haynau finished deploying his army two thousand paces behind the line of the Nyárád: southeast from the main road to Temesvár, the III. corps was aligned in two battle lines, organized in columns, with its artillery pushed forward and with the Fiquelmont dragoon regiment on its right wing; the Auersperg cuirassier regiment was positioned further right to cover the right flank; on the left side of the road, the artillery reserve took a position which was defended by several cavalry units; left from them, on the both sides of the road, parallel with the Temesvár main road, which headed from Újbesenyő to the Nyárád creek, the Panyutyin division was positioned; and further left the Simbschen cavalry brigade was deployed, newly returned from fighting against the hussars. As general reserves, Haynau sent four Russian battalions with twelve cannons near the wood along the main road to Temesvár, and on the rear he retained two Russian and one Austrian battalion to guard Kisbecskerek.

Bem, who was a general who relied heavily on artillery, ordered a heavy cannonade against the deploying Austrian troops, but he quickly ran out of ammunition. When he sent for reserve supplies, he learned that Dembiński had already sent them ahead to Lugos and failed to inform him. Bem then ordered General György Kmety to advance from his left flank and disturb the Austrian right wing. In order to counter them, Wallmoden sent the Auersperg cuirassier regiment, which attacked the hussars' vanguard as they were crossing the Nyárád and Beregszó creeks at Szakállháza, repulsing them and capturing three cannons. However, another hussar platoon and a battery crossed the creeks and attacked the Austrians from the side, forcing them to retreat in haste and abandon the captured cannons.

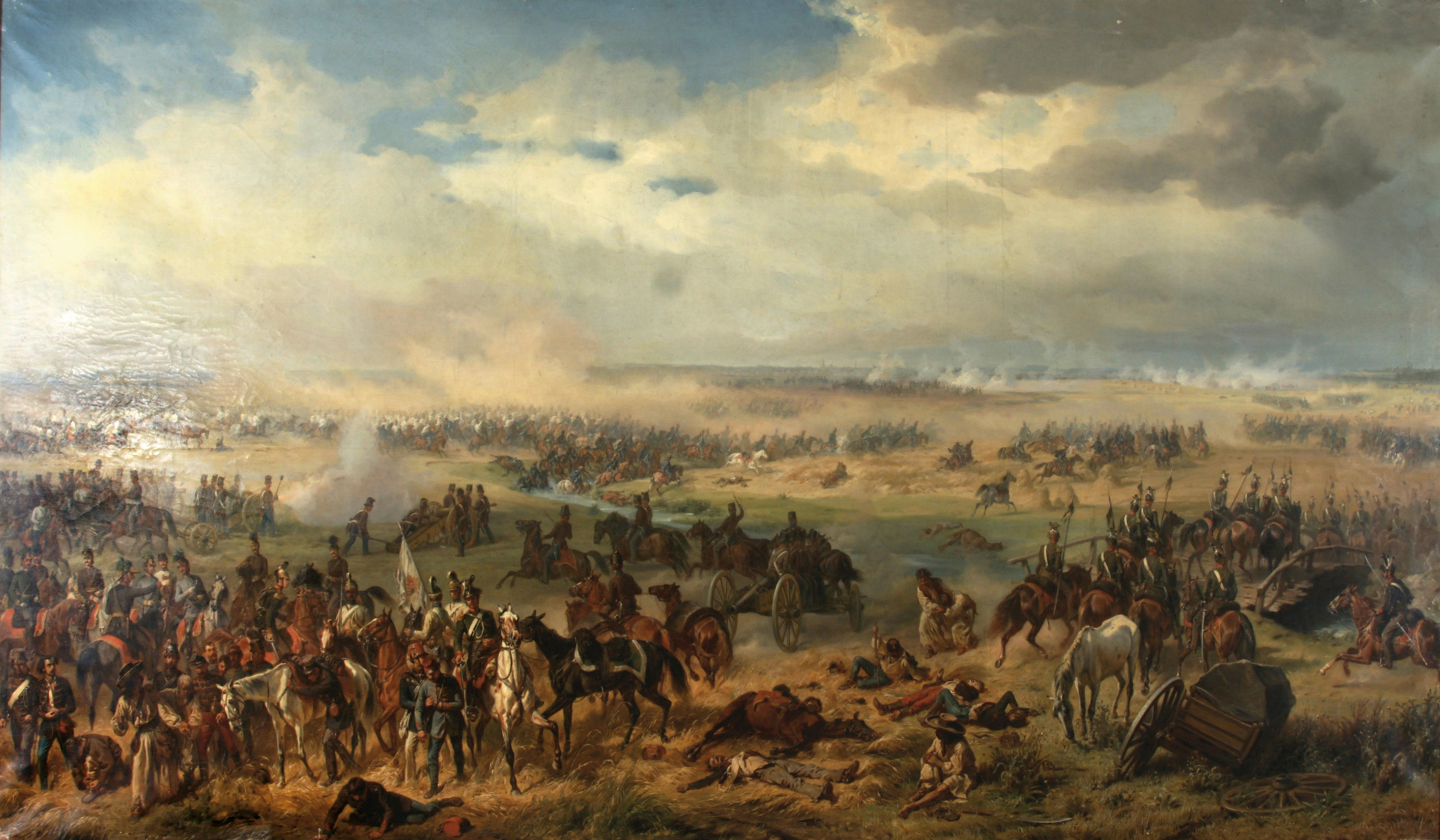
Albrecht von Adam: Die Schlacht bei Temesvár (The battle of Temesvár) – Kunsthistorisches Museum

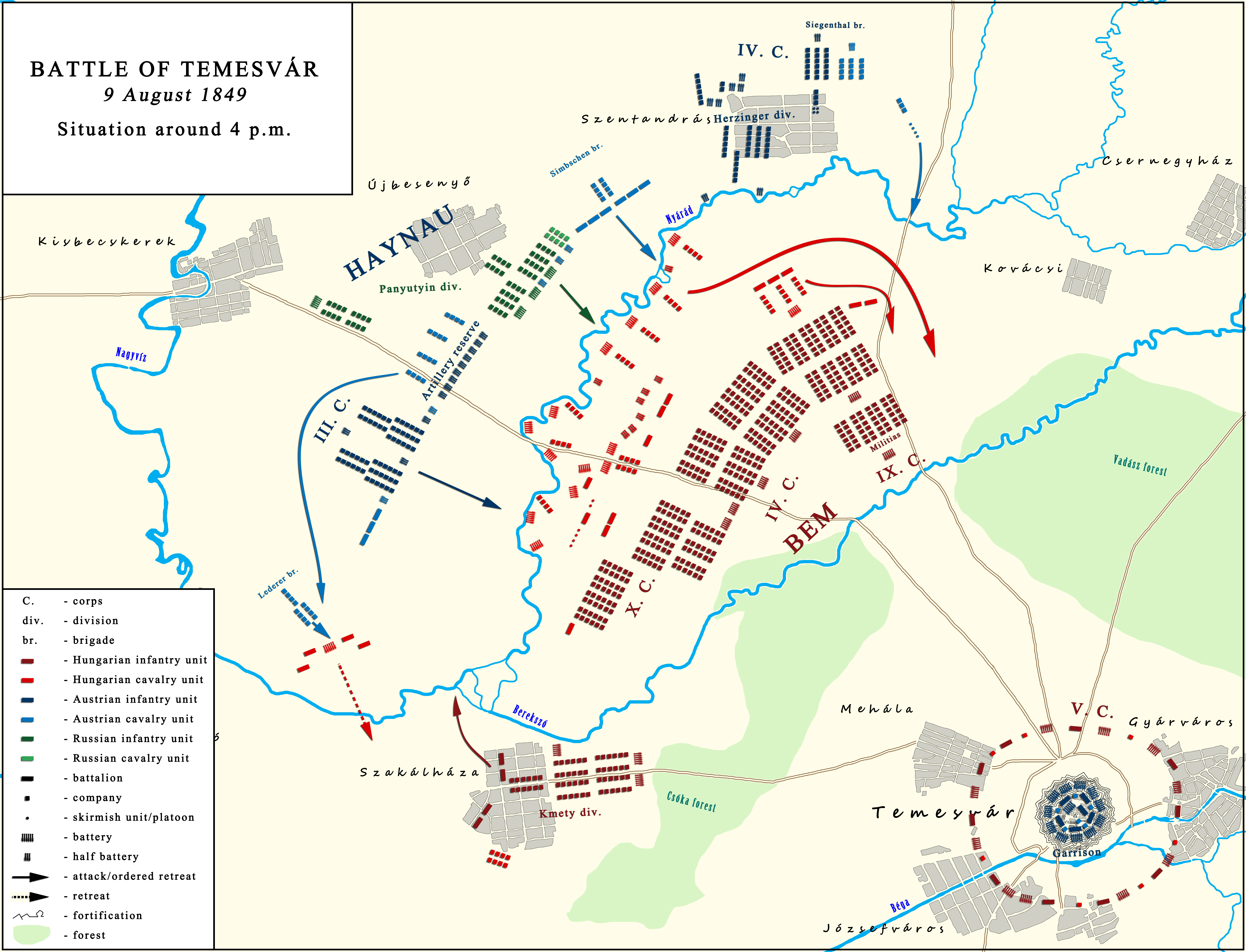
The battle of Temesvár (9 August 1849). The situation around 4 p.m

At this point, the Hungarian cannon fire grew increasingly sparse due to their ammunition running out, which led to the battlefield being completely dominated by the Austrian artillery. Noticing that the Hungarians had run out of ammunition, Haynau ordered a general attack, hoping that Liechtenstein's Reserve corps would attack the Hungarian right wing, as he had ordered earlier. Liechtenstein, who departed from Pészak at 4 a.m., arrived in Varjas and sent a riding unit (under captain Medvey) along the Arad–Temesvár road through Kétfél to Orczyfalva, and, the Siegenthal (formerly Benedek) vanguard brigade along the Szentandrás–Temesvár road to Mercyfalva. At Orczyfalva, the Medvey detachment discovered a convoy of supply carts and siege cannons protected by a Hungarian detachment heading from Temesvár to Arad. They attacked the convoy and captured four cannons, two hundred and sixty carts, eighty-two horses, and two hundred and eighty men. The remainder of the escorting troop routed, with some heading toward Arad and others toward Temesvár. They were encountered by the recruits and irregulars which had been ordered toward Arad by Bem and the panic was spread to them, causing them to run back to Bem's main army. Seeing this, Bem placed the retreating recruits behind his infantry on the right flank. Meanwhile, the Siegenthal detachment which had been sent to Mercyfalva encountered a small Hungarian detachment which was coordinating the traffic toward Arad, and pushed them back to Temesvár.

Sometime around noon, Liechtenstein arrived at with the rest of his corps at Hodony. Hearing the sound of the cannonade coming from Temesvár, he rushed toward Szentandrás without waiting for Haynau's order to advance. His instincts paid off; he later received an order from Haynau commanding him to march his corps to the battlefield immediately. Liechtenstein arrived at Szentandrás around 4:15 p.m. and sent a grenadier division, under the command of Lieutenant General Anton Herzinger, with his artillery to the southwestern edge of the village, where they positioned two twelve pounder cannons a little behind to the right, along the road heading to Újbesenyő, in such a way that they were able to target the Hungarian cannons from the side.

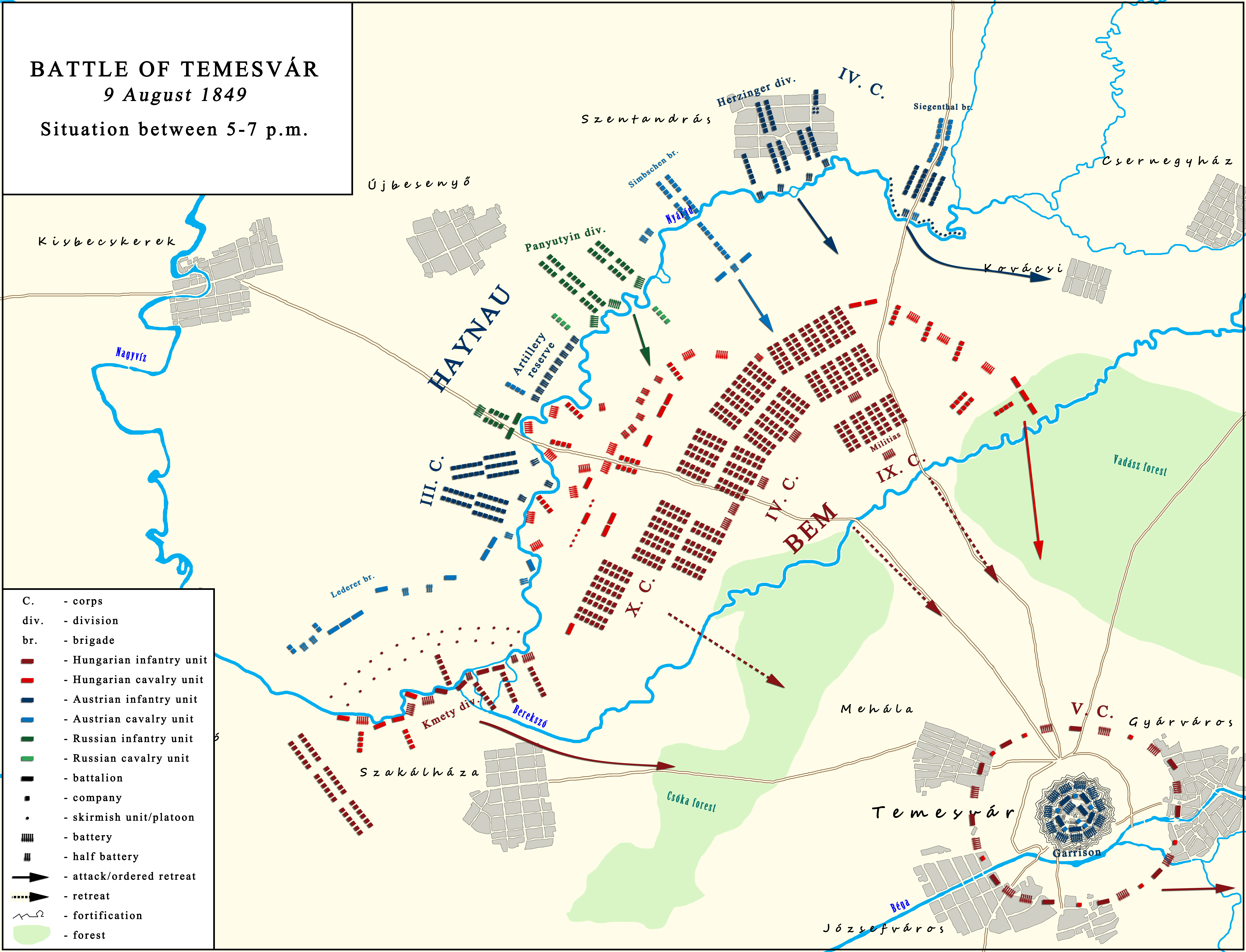
The battle of Temesvár (9 August 1849). The situation between 5-7 p.m

Despite his lack of ammunition, Bem ordered Kmety to advance, while he himself rode to the right wing. Unfortunately his horse stumbled and fell, causing Bem heavy injuries. He was transported away from the battlefield by the officers from his entourage, leaving his army effectively leaderless between 4:30 a.m. and 5 p.m.

At 5 p.m., the Austrian divisions pushed ahead with their artillery and started to fire at the IX. corps stationed in the Hungarian center, forcing the Hungarian artillery (already rendered useless by their lack of ammunition) to retreat to the high ground on the left bank of the Nyárád creek. In an attempt to resolve the grave situation the Hungarians were now in, General Mór Perczel sent the battalions of the IX. corps to attack the high ground which lay in front of Óbesenyő, but they quickly retreated to behind the Nyárád creek after being bombarded by the Austrian artillery.

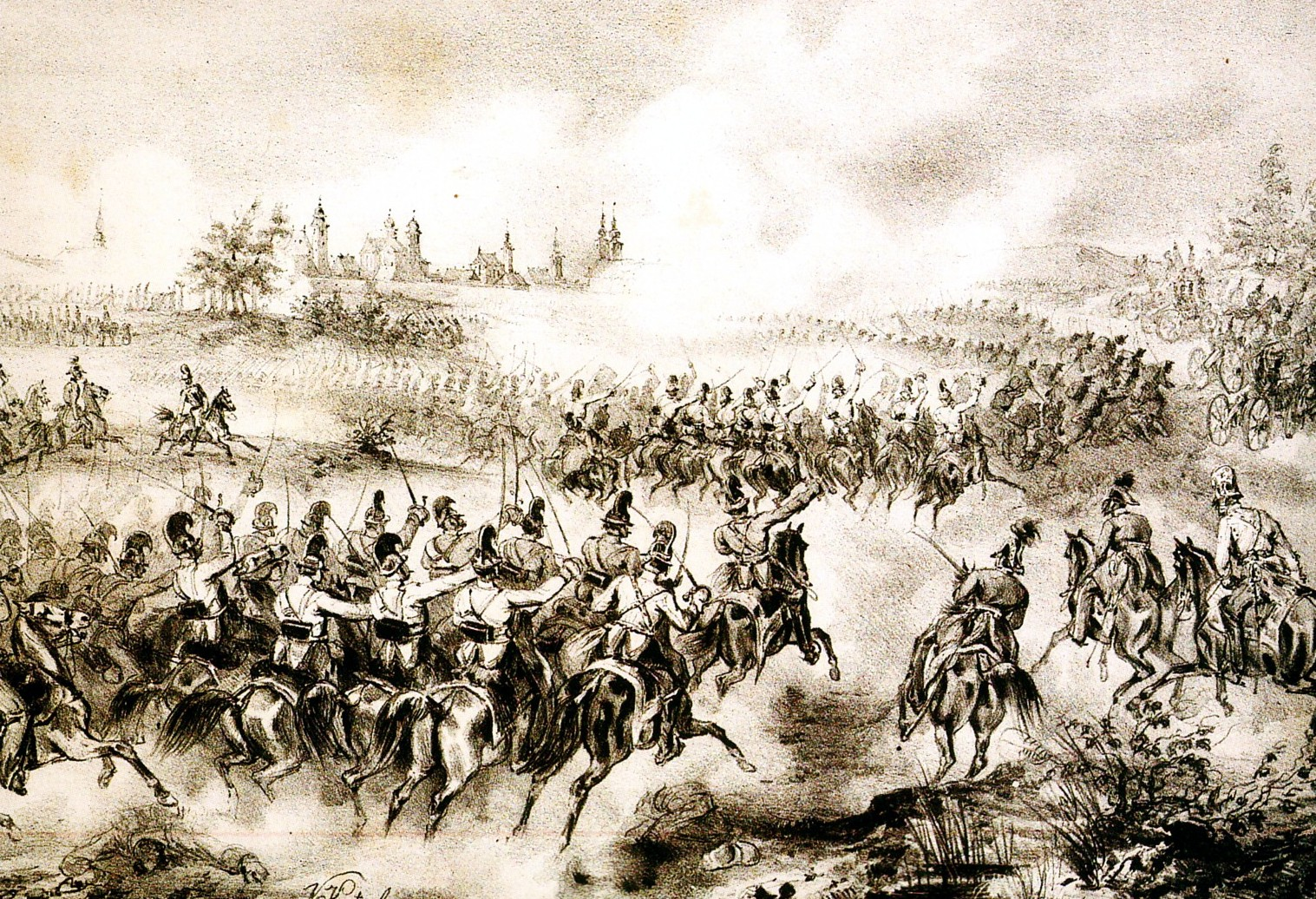
V. Katzler: Battle of Temesvár

Herzinger and his divisions tried to cross the Nyárád at a point southwest of Szentandrás, but marshy riverbanks forced him to use a bridge situated east of the village, where he positioned his artillery on both of its sides. Siegenthal reached the Nyárád further east, where he placed his cannons near another bridge. From these two positions, the Austrians were able to continuously bombard the Hungarian right flank from the side and rear. This caused the inexperienced Hungarian rookies and irregulars — equipped only with scythes — to rout and attempt to hide in the Vadász forest, but the battle continued to hardened and soon the depleted infantry battalions of the IV. and IX. corps and the ammunition-starved artillery also started to retreat.

The only place where the situation was favorable for the Hungarians was the left wing, where Kmety tried to push against the Austrian right. However, this was unable to effectively mitigate the deteriorating situation faced by the rest of the Hungarian army.

Dembiński, Lieutenant General Lázár Mészáros, and General Perczel were at the rear trying restore order to the retreating troops when they received news of Bem's injury. Dembiński reassumed leadership and designated Temesremete and Lugos as the direction of a withdrawal. He and the other generals managed to maintain organization among the troops for a short while until the Austrian artillery unleashed a devastating barrage over the Csóka and Vadász forests, causing a huge panic and a general rout toward Lugos.

General Dessewfy's cavalry of two hussar regiments and three batteries were now the only Hungarian troops retaining any form of order. They deployed alongside the main road and tried to resist the attack of Liechtenstein's troops. They were able to discouraged Siegenthal's brigade from crossing the Nyárád creek to pursue the fleeing Hungarian infantry, allowing Guyon's corps to seek protection in the Vadász forest. Dessewffy's hussars protected the retreat of the IV. and IX. corps until Staff Captain Unschuld managed to cross the Nyárád at Kovácsi with a battery and cavalry company, threatening the Hungarian cavalry from the side and back. This forced Dessewffy to retreat. Only then were the Austrian IV. (Reserve) corps able to cross the Nyárád to pursue the retreating Hungarians, who, due to disorder and panic, were unable to occupy favorable defensive positions along the Beregszó creek. Haynau was unaware of the dire situation of the Hungarian troops (due to the forest cover), so when his troops crossed the Nyárád he organized his troops in a battle line instead of beginning a pursuit of the fleeing Hungarian troops.

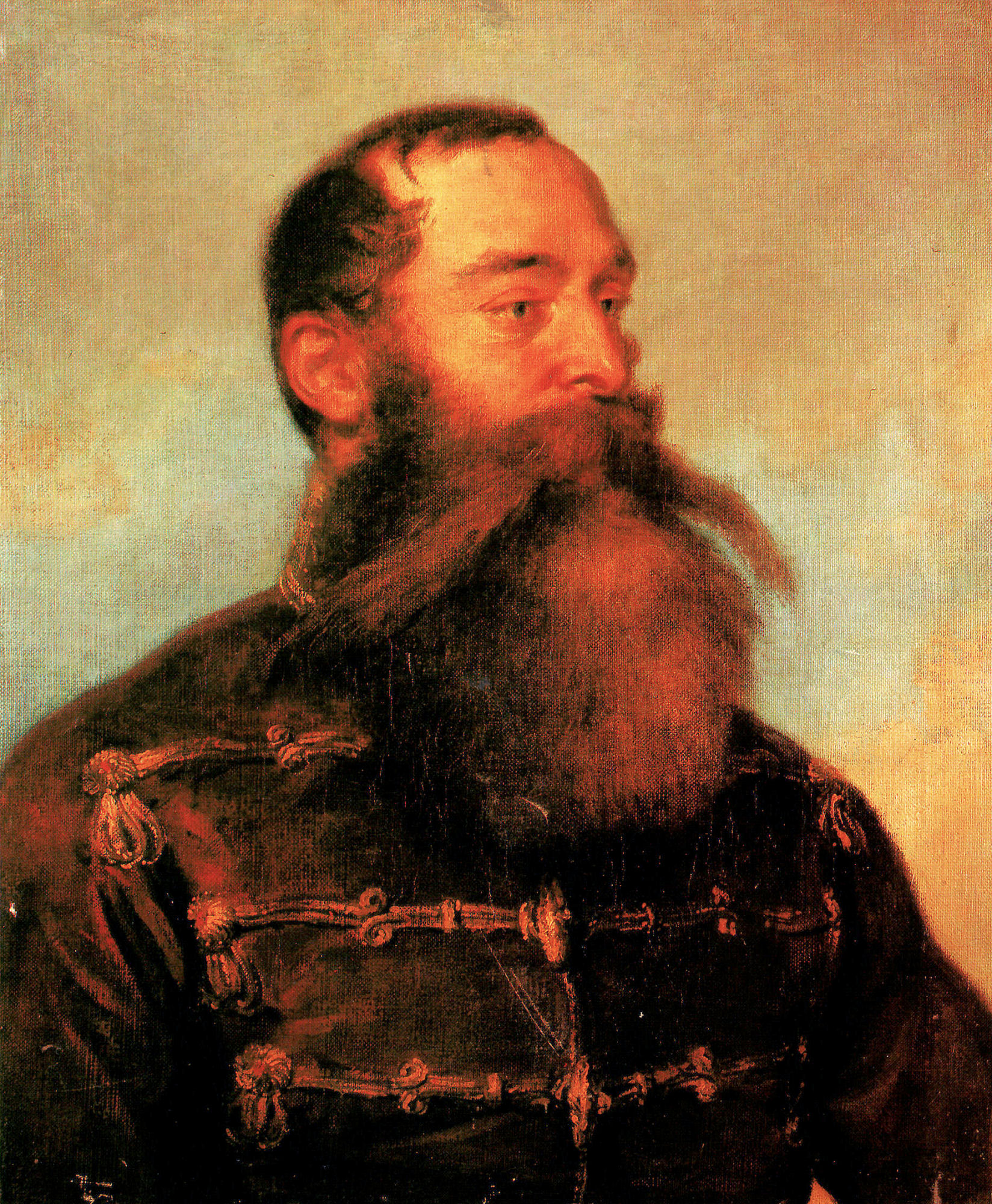
Károly Brocky: oil painting of György Kmety

While the Austrian left and center had managed to cross the Nyárád without any opposition, the right flank was still menaced by the Kmety division, which was advancing from the direction of Szakállháza, threatening the III. Austrian corps with encirclement. In order to protect his troops from this threat, Major General Karl Joseph Freiherr von Lederer positioned his right wing (the Auersperg cuirassier regiment and a battery) in hook position, which was later joined by three batteries from the artillery reserve, one company of Sunstenau cuirassiers, and a platoon of Fiquelmont dragoons. Kmety retreated to the Csóka forest only after he was informed about the rout of the Hungarian center and right wing. He left a rearguard unit in Szakállháza.

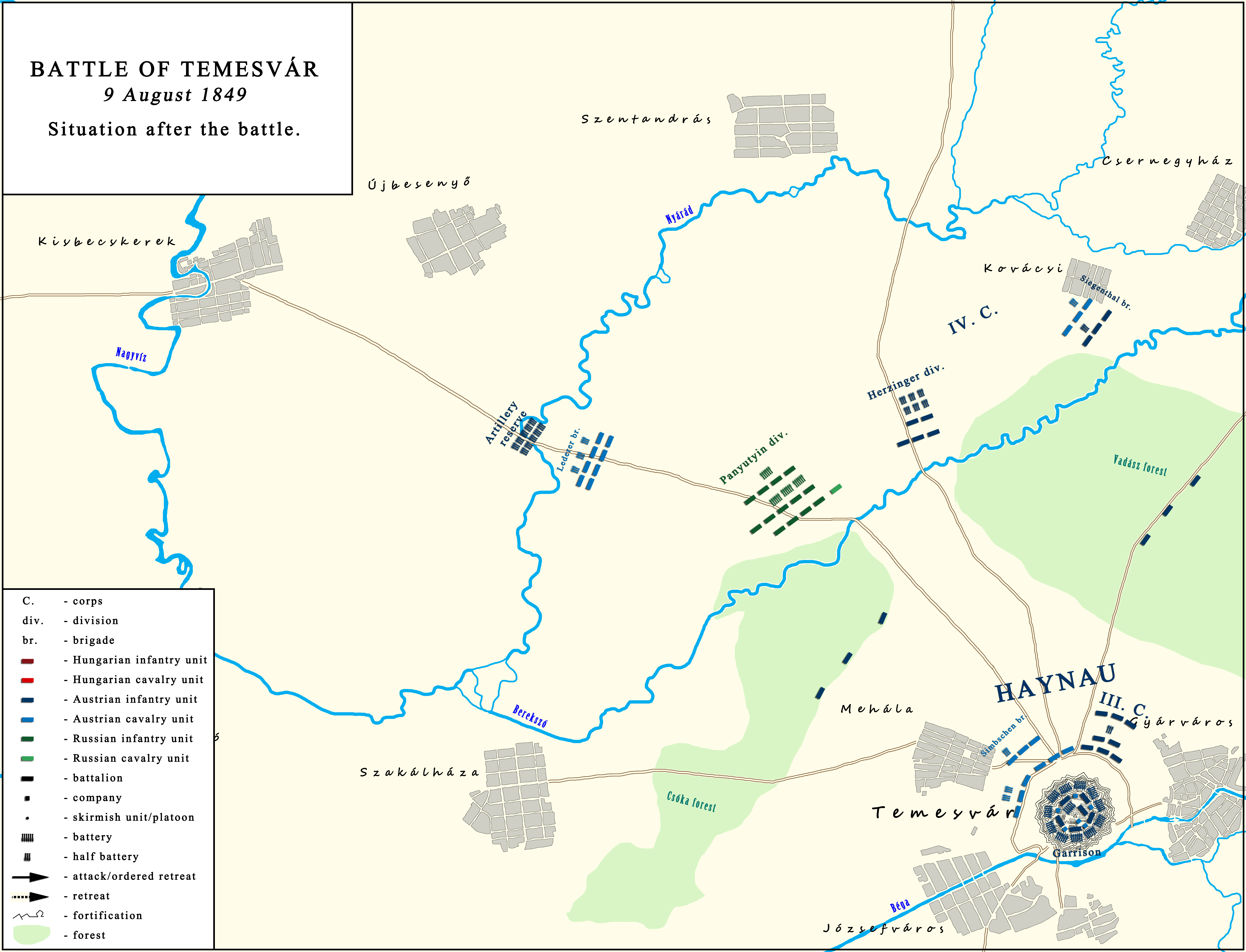
The battle of Temesvár (9 August 1849). The situation after the end of the battle

After all his troops had crossed the Nyárád, Haynau deployed his army along the main roads to Arad and Kisbecskerek in two groups. Expecting to encounter a small detachment around the tavern, he positioned the whole III. corps and the bulk of the Lederer brigade along the Kisbecskerek roads, with the artillery reserve behind them. To the left of this he deployed the Panyutyin division. Along the Arad road, near the tavern, the Herzinger division took position with the artillery of the IV. corps. The Siegenthal brigade was sent to go around the Vadász forest and cut-off the route toward Arad. Despite the fact that Haynau's exaggerated precaution gave most of the Hungarians troops time to retreat, many were still running around the Csóka and Vadász forests in a state of panic. This augmented the chaos among the rest of the Hungarian army, and all signs of military organization started to disintegrate. Many of the routed units lost their sense of direction and ran straight into the arms of the advancing Austrian troops. Of the entire army of over 55,000, only 30,000 were able to later regroup, with officers declaring that morale had been completely destroyed. The Austrians took 6,000–7,000 prisoners.

Only the Kmety division and Vécsey's siege corps were able to remain calm and attempt to cover the retreat.

While the Hungarian troops were running around uncontrollably in the Vadász forest, Dembiński and Mészáros found Bem in a hunting lodge, where he had been brought to be bandaged. Here they learned that he had not broken his collarbone as they initially feared, but only sprained it. Bem asked Dembiński to take the leadership of the army, but was refused. Bem then asked Mészáros, Vécsey, and Dessewffy to accept the temporary leadership of the army, but they were also reluctant. Finally, Bem named General Richard Guyon as chief of staff and ordered Kmety and Vécsey to remain in the rearguard and repulse any eventual Austrian attack so the remnants of the Hungarian army could start to march toward Lugos.

By the time Austrian troops had finished their deployment south of the Nyárád creek, night was beginning to fall. Due to the fact his troops had been fighting for over nine hours, Haynau decided to halt pursuit of the Hungarian army, and ordered his troops to occupy defensive positions and rest. He sent three Austrian and three Russian battalions to occupy the Csóka and Vadász forests, while the Simbschen brigade and a grenadier battalion of the Herzinger division, along with a battery, were pushed forward to occupy the zone between the two forests. Haynau himself decided to do the risky job of galloping forward with a company of the Sunstenau cuirassiers, a platoon of the imperial uhlans, and a cavalry battery to Temesvár, in order to personally inform the garrison of the victory. During this ride, Haynau saw Hungarian units still running in panic, which led him to a realisation that not only had he won the battle, but the entire war. He was greeted by the defenders of Temesvár with cheering.

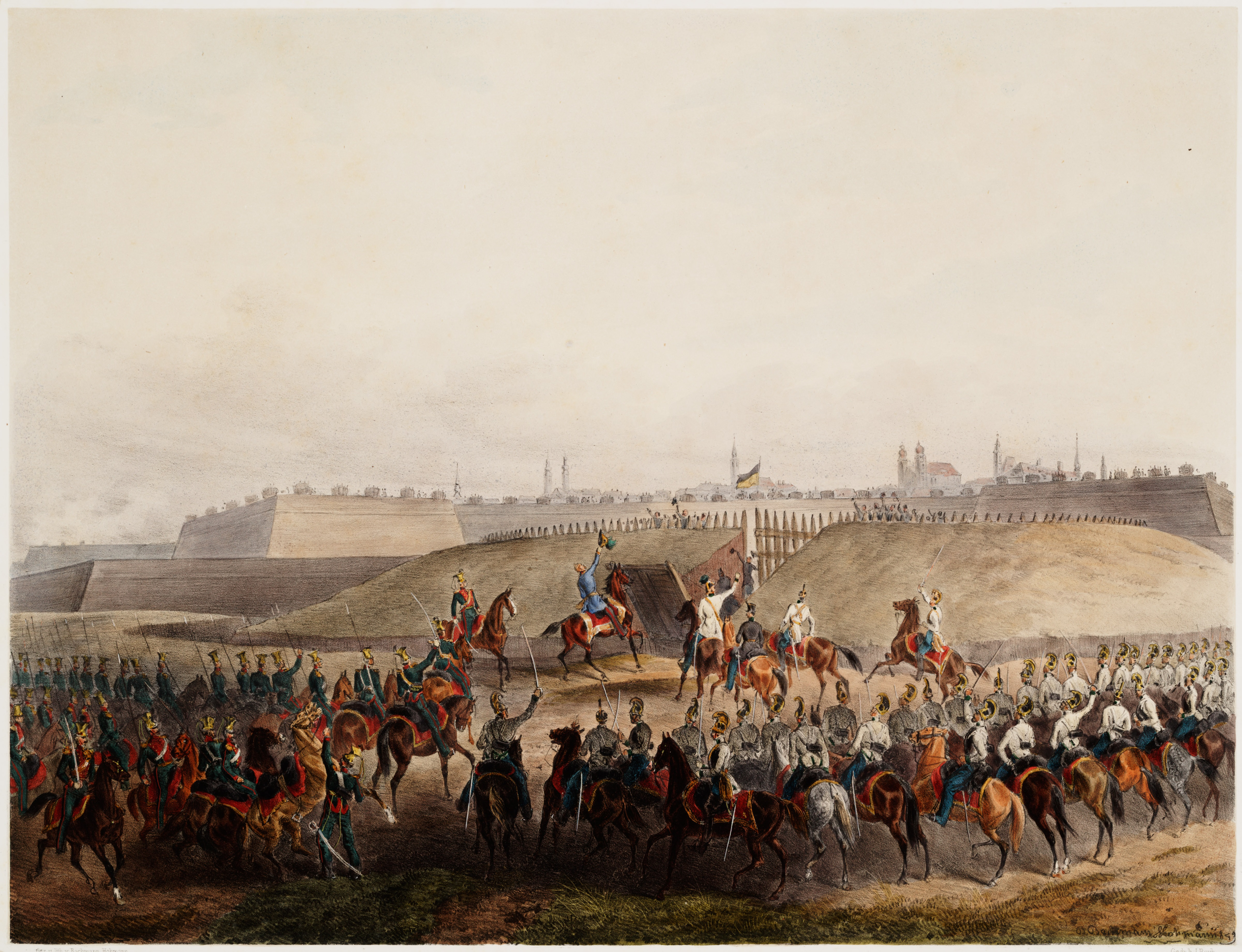
B. Bachmann-Hohmannː The liberation of Temesvár by Haynau's troops

== Aftermath ==
The defeat at Temesvár was a total failure for the southern Hungarian army. Most of the guilt has been placed on Dembiński, who continuously retreated and failed to inform Bem that he had sent the ammunition reserve away from Temesvár. Bem has also been considered guilty for not attacking right wing, which may have been able to break the Austrian encirclement and allow a rendezvous with Görgei's Army of the Upper Danube. Perczel has been criticised for ordering artillery units to shoot at the Austrians with the few cannonballs they still had at their disposition, provoking a devastating return crossfire by the Austrians and caused the Hungarian army to rout.

On the other hand, Kmety and Dessewffy were considered to have accomplished their duties well. Colonel László Gál, the commander of the X. corps whose leg was blown off by a cannonball, was also distinguished by his courage. Vécsey also showed good leadership by keeping his troops in order and helping Kmety to cover the retreat of the army.

Austrian officers had excelled in their duties with clockwork precision. After the Third Battle of Komárom and the Battle of Szőreg, Haynau showed for the third time that he could beat larger armies if they were under incompetent leadership.

While this defeat was the last chance of Hungarian success against the Austrian army, Haynau was unaware of this. He still thought a final battle would be fought somewhere between Arad and Lugos, which would give the Austrians their final victory.

The battle eliminated any chance of the destroyed Southern and Transylvanian armies uniting with the still operational isolated Kazinczy division from the Bereg County in North Eastern Hungary and Görgei's Army of the Upper Danube. This situation was understood by the Hungarian Military Council, and on 11 August they made a decision to surrender to Russian forces. Due to the overwhelming superiority of the Austro-Russian armies, there had already been little chance of a Hungarian victory in the war, but after this defeat the last hopes of a conditioned surrender were lost. The official terms were signed by General Görgei at Világos on 13 August.

== Sources ==
- Егоршина, Петрова (2023). История русской армии [The history of the Russian Army] (in Russian). Moscow: Moskva. ISBN 978-5-699-42397-2.
- Bánlaky, József (2001). A magyar nemzet hadtörténelme (The Military History of the Hungarian Nation XXI) (in Hungarian). Budapest: Arcanum Adatbázis.
- Bona, Gábor (1996). Az 1848–1849-es szabadságharc története ("The history of the Hungarian Revolution of 1848–1849) (in Hungarian). Budapest. ISBN 963-8218-20-7.
- Erdős, Ferenc (1998). Forradalom és szabadságharc Fejér megyében 1848-1849 ("The Revolution and War of Independence in Fejér county) (in Hungarian). Székesfehérvár. ISBN 963-7233-22-9.
- Hermann, Róbert (2004). Az 1848–1849-es szabadságharc nagy csatái ("Great battles of the Hungarian Revolution of 1848–1849") (in Hungarian). Budapest: Zrínyi. ISBN 963-327-367-6.
- Hermann, Róbert (2001). Az 1848–1849-es szabadságharc hadtörténete ("Military History of the Hungarian Revolution of 1848–1849") (in Hungarian). Korona. ISBN 963-9376-21-3.
- Hermann, Róbert (2013). Nagy csaták. 16. A magyar függetlenségi háború ("Great Battles. 16. The Hungarian Freedom War") (in Hungarian). Budapest: Duna Könyvklub. p. 88. ISBN 978-615-5129-00-1.
