= Cărpiniș =

- Commune
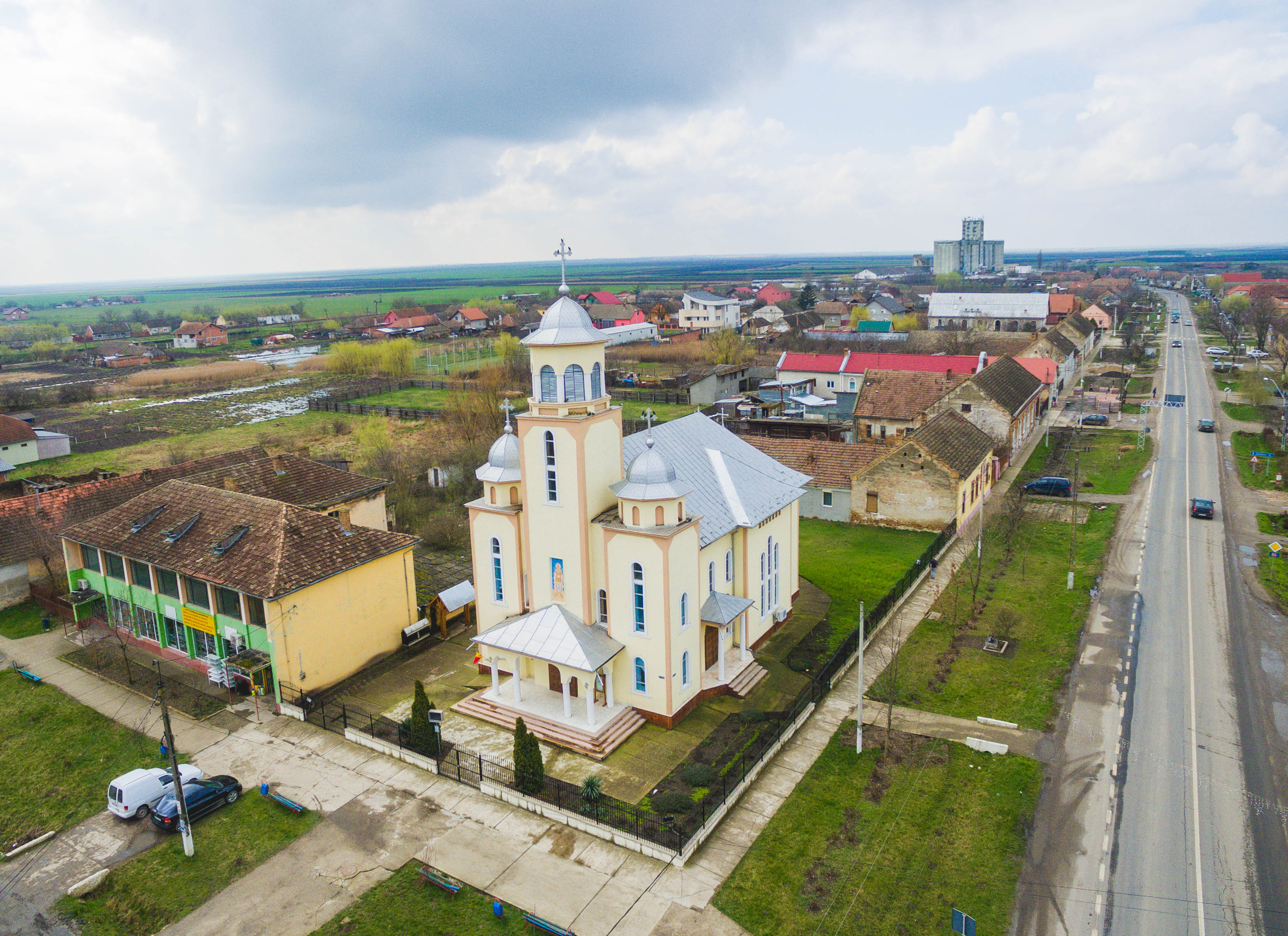
- The Orthodox church in Cărpiniș

- Location in Timiș County

- Location in Romania
- Coordinates: 45.7872°N 20.9044°E
- Country: Romania
- County: Timiș

Government
  - Mayor (2020–): Dumitru Marcel Popa (PSD)
- Area: 45.88 km^{2} (17.71 sq mi)
- Population (2021-12-01): 4,278
  - Density: 93.24/km^{2} (241.5/sq mi)
- Time zone: UTC+02:00 (EET)
  - Summer (DST): UTC+03:00 (EEST)
- Postal code: 307090–307092
- Vehicle reg.: TM
- Website: primariacarpinis.ro

Cărpiniș (German: Weißbuchenau or Gertianosch; Hungarian: Gyertyámos; Serbian: Грћанош, romanized: Grćanoš; formerly Gertiamoș) is a commune in Timiș County, Romania. It is composed of two villages, Cărpiniș (commune seat) and Iecea Mică. It also included Iecea Mare until that village was split off to form a separate commune in 2004.

== Geography ==
The commune is located in the west of Timiș County, 28.6 km (17.8 mi) from Timișoara and 15.2 km (9.4 mi) from Jimbolia – the nearest town – and covers an area of 4.15 km^{2} (1.60 mi^{2}), of which 3.31 km^{2} (1.28 mi^{2}) is Cărpiniș and 0.84 km^{2} (0.32 mi^{2}) is Iecea Mică. In terms of relief, the commune lies within some natural valleys that are part of an old swamp that over time has been drained. On a relatively small area, the relief includes a fertile plain area that is part of the southeast of the Tisa Plain. The relatively smooth surface of the plain imprinted wandering courses with numerous arms and swampy areas on the flowing and retreating waters.

=== Climate ===
Cărpiniș's climate is classified as temperate and continental, characteristic of the southeastern part of the Pannonian Basin, with some sub-Mediterranean and oceanic influences. The average temperatures range from −0.6 °C (30.9 °F) during winter to 21.8 °C (71.2 °F) during summer. Being predominantly under the influence of maritime air masses from the northwest, Cărpiniș receives a higher amount of precipitation than those registered in the Wallachian Plain. The annual average rainfall, 580 mm (23 in), close to the national average, is achieved mainly due to the rich rainfall in May, June, July (34.4% of the annual total) and those in November and December, when a secondary maximum is recorded, a reflection of the sub-Mediterranean climatic influences. However, the precipitation regime has an irregular character, wet years alternating with dry years.

=== Flora and fauna ===
On the expanse of the commune, the forests are missing, but there are plants characteristic of the steppe:

- flowering, herbaceous plants;
- trees and shrubs: elms, locusts, mulberries, sumacs, blackthorns;
- grassy vegetation: amaranth, wild spinach, thorn apple, danewort, cock's-foot, white clover, black medick;
- crop weeds: dog's tooth grass, pricklegrass, field thistle, foxtail, cockspur, wild thyme, hoary alyssum, hawkweed oxtongue, mouse-ear hawkweed.

As fauna, representative of this area are rodents, many of them harmful to crops (susliks, hamsters, voles, mole rats, hares), animals of prey (polecats, foxes, badgers), large mammals (deers) and ground-nesting birds (larks, buntings, bustards, quails, partridges). The pounds around Cărpiniș are populated by reptiles such as pond frogs, toads, tree frogs and salamanders and various species of fish: common carp, Prussian carp, common bleak, northern pike, catfish. Insects are represented by crickets, grasshoppers, mole crickets, locusts, ground beetles, potato bugs.

== History ==
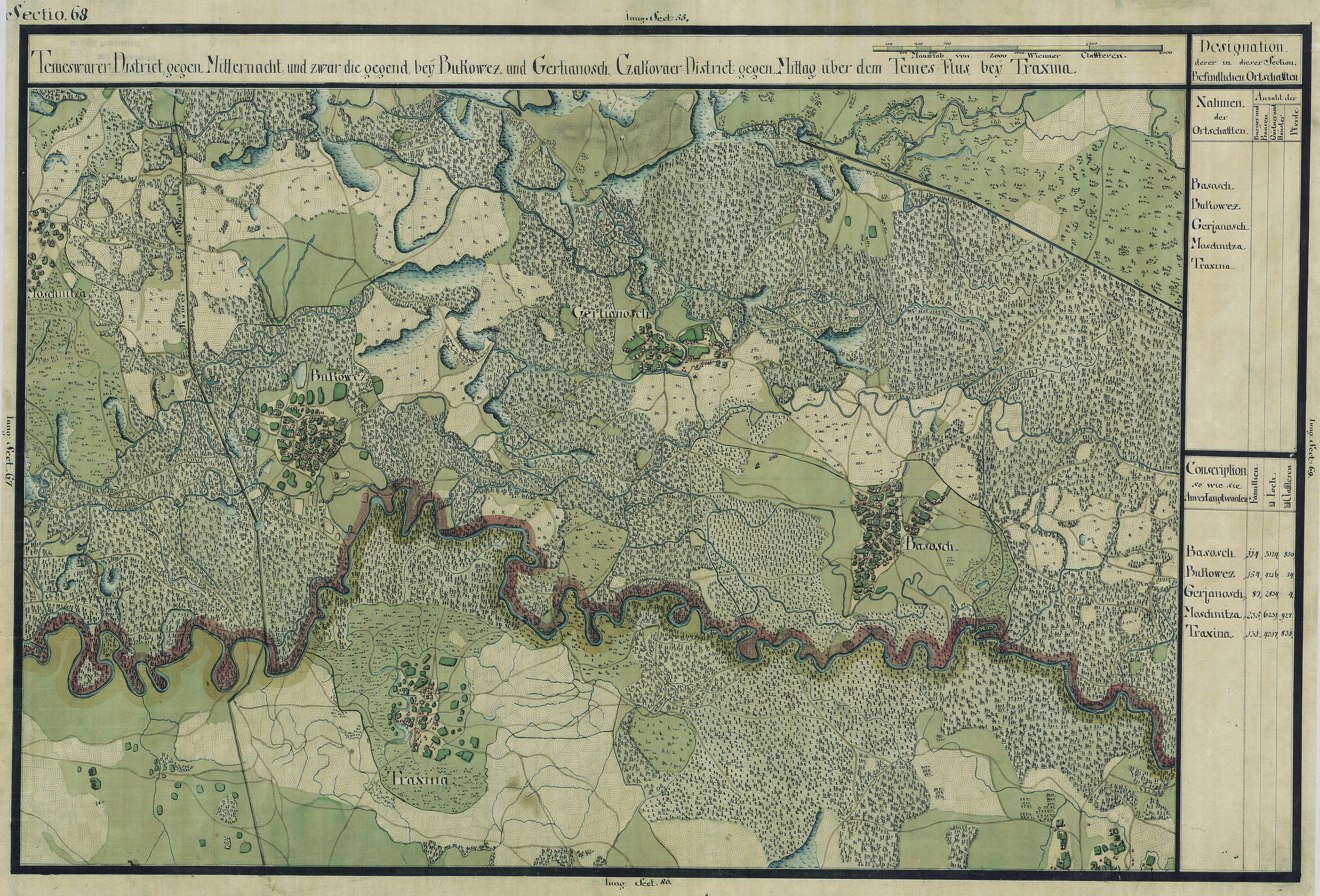
Cărpiniș (Gertianosch) in the Josephinische Landesaufnahme of 1769–1772

Cărpiniș first appears in written history as Gyertyamus in 1377. The village is destroyed in 1552 by the Ottoman troops led by Kara Ahmed Pasha; in the next two centuries, it appears as uninhabited place in local chronicles and on medieval maps. However, during the Ottoman occupation, there was a hamlet inhabited by Serbs and Romanians called Mali Tovin (Serbian Cyrillic: Мали Товин; Romanian: Micul Dovin). The hearth of the old village was not on its current location, being somewhere 1.5 km to the west. Fallen under Austrian rule in 1718, the village was re-established with a number of 73 houses, the Romanian inhabitants engaging in animal husbandry and wood processing, given that there were hornbeam forests in the area, hence the name of the village (in Romanian cărpiniș means "groves or thickets of hornbeams"). The pastures and part of the forests were owned by Dobrin Mali, land that belonged to a count from Bobda. According to Slovene philologist Franz Miklosich, the village was called Grdonovo, then Grdonova and later Gertzonosch. In 1766, according to an ordinance of the Austrian state administration, the commune was abolished and relocated on its current location. This ordinance was due to the fact that Empress Maria Theresa organized the two great colonizations in this area in 1740–1780; they were coordinated by the administration councilor Johann Wilhelm von Hildebrand. Between 1776 and 1778, 56 German (Swabian) families were colonized here. The authorities relocated Romanians and Serbs from Cărpiniș to Bazoș, in order to make room for the settlers, who also came from the neighboring villages of Iecea Mare and Lenauheim, but also from Luxembourg and Schwarzwald. It then became one of the largest rural settlements in Banat, with an active and wealthy German community.

Iecea Mică is first mentioned in 1467 as Ewcze, although it is much older. In 1987, archaeologists of the Museum of Banat in Timișoara discovered here a large Daco-Roman settlement dating back to the 3rd–4th centuries. The present-day village was founded in 1769–1770, by colonizing with Germans, within the second wave of colonizations of Banat, the so-called "Theresian colonization" (German: Theresianische Ansiedlung). The person in charge of founding the new colony was councilor Neumann from Timișoara. He facilitated the settlement of 150 German families here, farmers and craftsmen from Pfalz, Alsace, Lorraine and Württemberg. The settlers built 100 houses and a school. The colony was named Kleinjetscha. The Roman Catholic church was built in 1813. In 1865, a large fire burned half the village.

== Demographics ==
Ethnic composition (2021)
1. Romanians (80.0%)
2. Roma (3.17%)
3. Hungarians (1.12%)
4. Unknown (14.7%)
5. Others (0.98%)
Religious composition (2021)
1. Orthodox (61.5%)
2. Pentecostals (13.4%)
3. Roman Catholics (4.20%)
4. Baptists (2.01%)
5. Greek Catholics (1.72%)
6. Unknown (15.6%)
7. Others (1.12%)
8. Irreligious, atheists and agnostics (0.46%)

Cărpiniș had a population of 4,278 inhabitants at the 2021 census, down 4.44% from the 2011 census. Most inhabitants are Romanians (80.01%), larger minorities being represented by Roma (3.17%) and Hungarians (1.12%). For 14.72% of the population, ethnicity is unknown. By religion, most inhabitants are Orthodox (61.52%), but there are also minorities of Pentecostals (13.41%), Roman Catholics (4.2%), Baptists (2.01%) and Greek Catholics (1.72%). For 15.56% of the population, religious affiliation is unknown.

| Census | | Ethnic composition |
| Year | Population | Romanians | Hungarians | Germans | Roma |
|---|---|---|---|---|---|
| 1880 | 4,900 | 34 | 57 | 4,767 | – |
| 1890 | 4,695 | 20 | 64 | 4,556 | – |
| 1900 | 4,286 | 28 | 81 | 4,111 | – |
| 1910 | 4,138 | 78 | 213 | 3,773 | – |
| 1920 | 3,928 | 30 | – | 3,839 | – |
| 1930 | 4,075 | 128 | 320 | 3,533 | 64 |
| 1941 | 4,319 | 202 | 362 | 3,573 | – |
| 1956 | 4,537 | – | – | – | – |
| 1966 | 5,062 | 2,791 | 411 | 1,631 | 200 |
| 1977 | 5,560 | 3,608 | 407 | 1,300 | 220 |
| 1992 | 4,792 | 4,027 | 306 | 217 | 226 |
| 2002 | 4,851 | 4,188 | 259 | 87 | 301 |
| 2011 | 4,477 | 3,688 | 148 | 44 | 242 |
| 2021 | 4,278 | 3,423 | 48 | 26 | 136 |

== Politics and administration ==
The commune of Cărpiniș is administered by a mayor and a local council composed of 15 councilors. The mayor, Dumitru Marcel Popa, from the Social Democratic Party, has been in office since 2020. As from the 2024 local elections, the local council has the following composition by political parties:

| Party | Seats | Composition |
|---|---|---|
| Social Democratic Party–National Liberal Party | 11 | |
| Save Romania Union–People's Movement Party–Force of the Right | 3 | |
| Alliance for the Union of Romanians | 1 | |

== Notable people ==
- Ion Rizea (b. 1971), actor
