= Iecea Mare =

- Commune
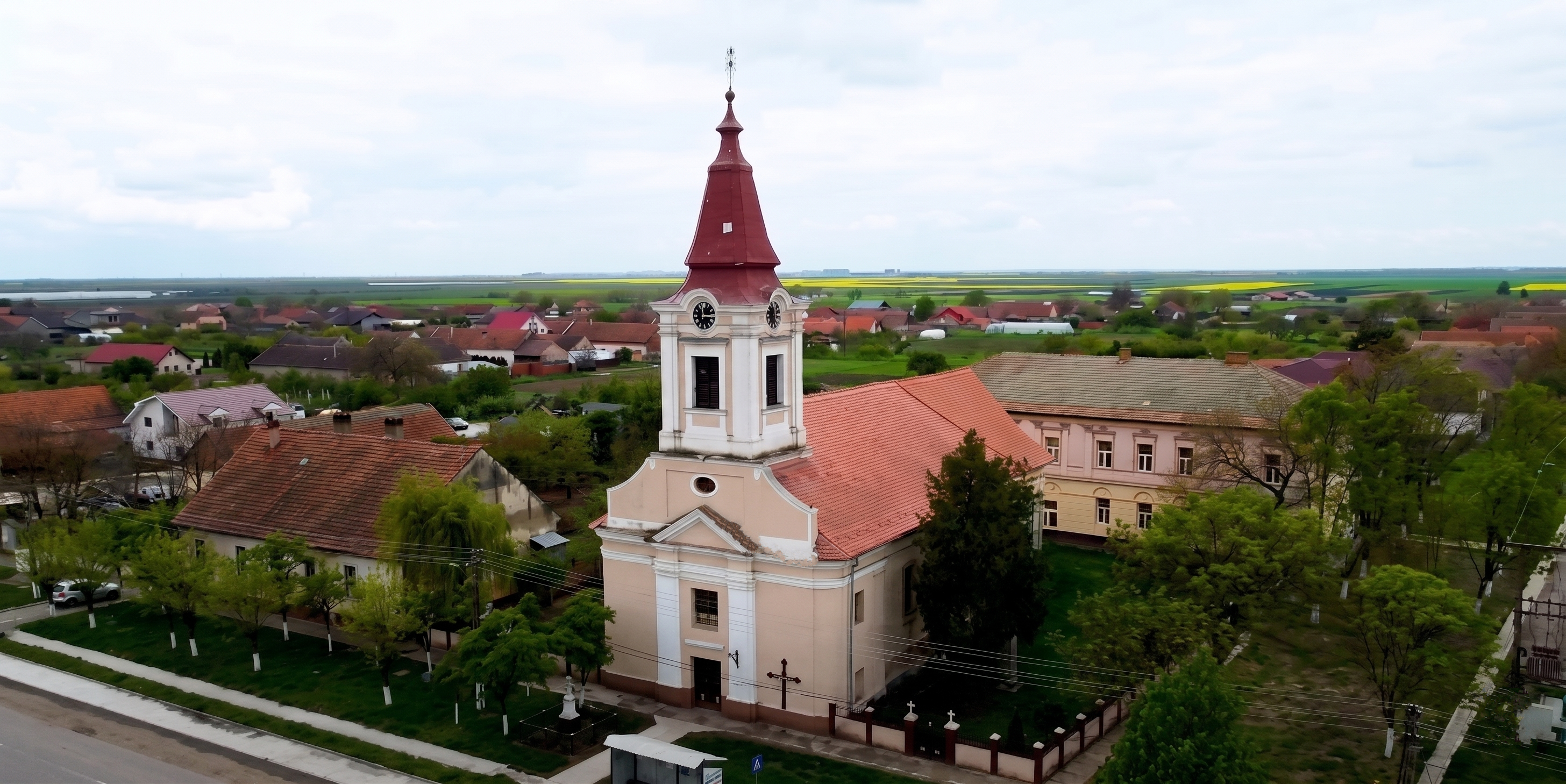
- The Roman Catholic church in 2026

- Location in Timiș County

- Location in Romania
- Coordinates: 45°51′N 20°53′E
- Country: Romania
- County: Timiș

Government
  - Mayor (2012–): Liviu-Ștefan Tomulea (PSD)
- Area: 35.31 km^{2} (13.63 sq mi)
- Population (2021-12-01): 3,111
  - Density: 88.11/km^{2} (228.2/sq mi)
- Time zone: UTC+02:00 (EET)
  - Summer (DST): UTC+03:00 (EEST)
- Postal code: 307091
- Vehicle reg.: TM
- Website: www.primariaieceamare.ro

Iecea Mare (Hungarian: Nagyjécsa; German: Großjetscha; Serbian: Велика Јеча, romanized: Velika Ječa) is a commune in Timiș County, Romania. It is composed of a single village, Iecea Mare, and was part of the commune of Cărpiniș until 2004, when it was split off.

== History ==
The first recorded mention of a settlement named Uche dates from 1317. This settlement existed throughout the Middle Ages, as shown by numerous medieval documents reminiscent of Wche (1417), Ewcze (1467), Eqche (1479). After the expulsion of the Turks from Banat, one cannot speak of a settlement, but there was the Jetsa estate, as shown by Count Mercy's map of 1723.

The present-day village was founded in 1767 by Councilor Johann Wilhelm Edler von Hildebrand, who brought German settlers from Lorraine, Luxembourg, Trier, Bavaria, etc., for whom he built 202 houses. The Germans named some areas of the village and the streets after their origin. Thus, there were Österreich ("Austria") and Haszrundel areas and Luxembourg, Trier, Bakowa, Kirchen, Nei, Periam, Lefelstadt, Yeger, Schwarzwald ("Black Forest") and Letzte ("last arrived") streets. In 1779 the name Gross Jetscha ("Great Iecea") also appears, and the locality is assigned to Torontál County. In 1836, there was a cholera epidemic that killed about 100 locals.

== Demographics ==
Ethnic composition (2021)
1. Romanians (83.4%)
2. Roma (10.5%)
3. Unknown (4.69%)
4. Others (1.33%)
Religious composition (2021)
1. Orthodox (78.3%)
2. Pentecostals (7.52%)
3. Roman Catholics (4.88%)
4. Greek Catholics (1.54%)
5. Adventists (1.15%)
6. Unknown (5.23%)
7. Others (1.41%)

Iecea Mare had a population of 3,111 inhabitants at the 2021 census, up 39.44% from the 2011 census. Most inhabitants are Romanians (83.44%), with a minority of Roma (10.54%). For 4.69% of the population, ethnicity is unknown. By religion, most inhabitants are Orthodox (78.27%), but there are also minorities of Pentecostals (7.52%), Roman Catholics (4.88%), Greek Catholics (1.54%) and Adventists (1.15%). For 5.23% of the population, religious affiliation is unknown.

Census		Ethnic composition
Year	Population	Romanians	Hungarians	Germans	Roma
1880	3,297	24	21	3,193	–
1890	3,431	30	20	3,329	–
1900	3,099	38	68	2,923	68
1910	2,535	34	48	2,360	81
1920	2,549	47	5	2,412	–
1930	2,289	38	11	2,107	130
1941	2,355	59	69	2,051	–
1956	3,056	–	–	–	–
1966	3,173	1,573	21	1,411	161
1977	2,986	1,610	23	1,162	187
1992	2,297	1,907	25	115	243
2002	2,315	2,008	24	37	239
2011	2,231	1,878	9	8	117
2021	3,111	2,596	7	14	328

== Politics and administration ==
The commune of Iecea Mare is administered by a mayor and a local council composed of 11 councilors. The mayor, Liviu-Ștefan Tomulea, from the Social Democratic Party, has been in office since 2012. As from the 2024 local elections, the local council has the following composition by political parties:

Party	Seats	Composition
Social Democratic Party	6	
National Liberal Party	5	
