= Wild spinach =

Wild spinach is a common name for several plants with edible leaves and may refer to:

Species in the genus Chenopodium:

- Chenopodium album, a common weed with global distribution
- Chenopodium bonus-henricus

Species in the genus Cleome:

- Cleome foliosa, native to Africa
- Cleome gynandra, native to Africa
- Cleome serrulata, native to western North America

Species in the genus Beta:

- Beta vulgaris subsp. maritima
