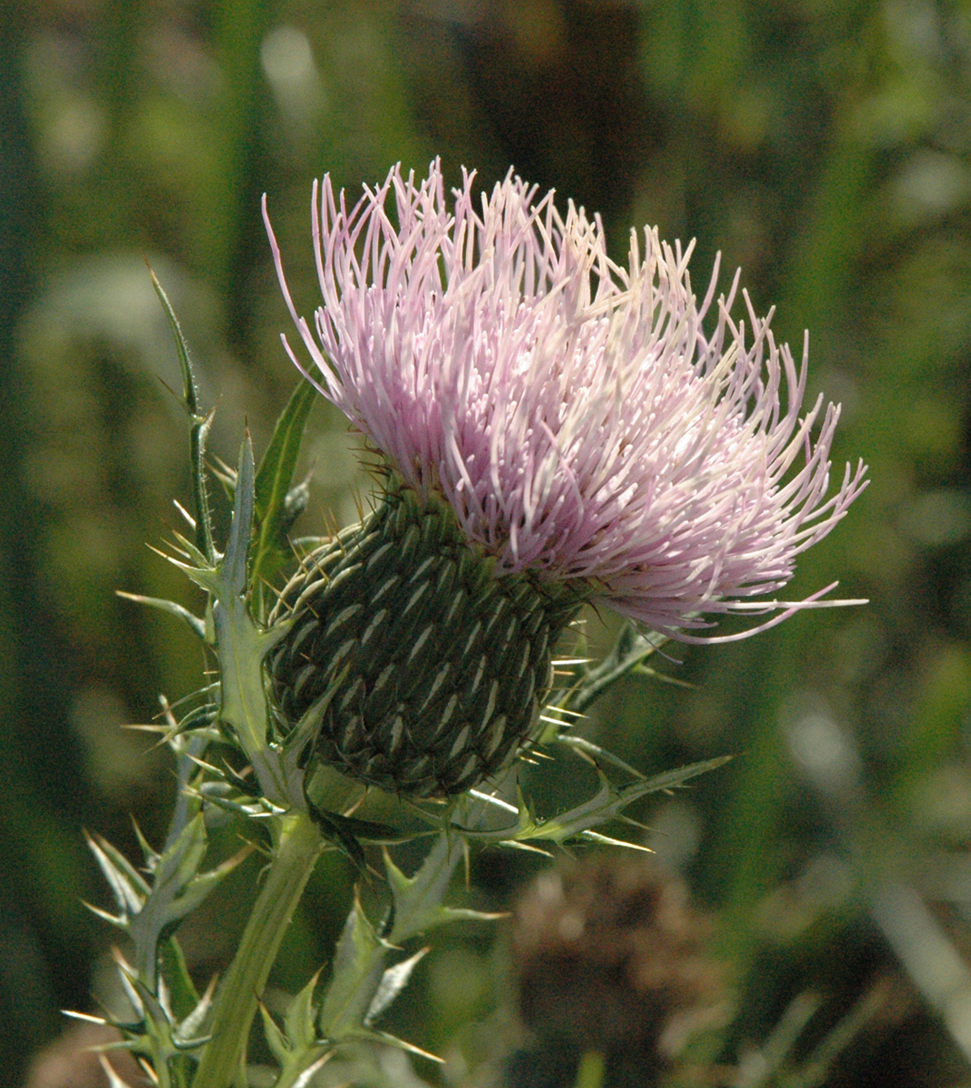

Scientific classification
- Kingdom: Plantae
- Clade: Tracheophytes
- Clade: Angiosperms
- Clade: Eudicots
- Clade: Asterids
- Order: Asterales
- Family: Asteraceae
- Genus: Cirsium
- Species: C. discolor

Binomial name
- Cirsium discolor (Muhl. ex Willd.) Spreng.

Synonyms
- Carduus discolor (Muhl. ex Willd.) Nutt.; Cnicus altissimus f. albiflora Britton; Cnicus altissimus var. discolor (Muhl. ex Willd.) A.Gray; Cnicus discolor Muhl. ex Willd.

= Cirsium discolor =

Species of thistle

Cirsium discolor, the field thistle, is a North American species of plants in the tribe Cardueae within the family Asteraceae. It is native to thirty-three states in the United States as well four Canadian provinces. It occurs across much of eastern and central Canada as well as eastern and central United States. It has been found from New Brunswick west to Saskatchewan and south as far as Texas and Georgia.

Field thistle is a biennial or perennial herb up to 200 cm (78.5 in) tall, producing a large taproot. There is usually only one stem with numerous spiny leaves that are green on the upper side but white and woolly underneath. The plant's flower heads are large and showy and have the pale to medium value purplish magenta coloration (lilac, lavender, pinkish purple, purplish pink) that is especially attractive to butterflies. The same color can be seen in the flowers of the genus Liatris, among many others. Heads have many disc florets but no ray florets. The species grows primarily in damp areas in forest openings, prairies, and disturbed sites.

It is used as a component of some North American prairie and wildflower meadow restoration mixes that focus on the use of native species. Like most other thistles, it is a food plant for the caterpillars of the Painted Lady butterfly. Most thistles produce a large quantity of nectar and pollen. The large flower heads make them attractive to large butterflies like migrating monarchs. Bumblebees also make use of thistles, gathering the pollen. Hummingbirds sometimes gather nectar from them. This species is of similar size, height, and appearance to the Bull Thistle, but it is less spiny, has whitish leaf undersides, and, unlike Bull Thistle, often has quite pale flowers. Many thistle species are monocarpic. This means that the plant will flower once and then die. Reproduction of this flower is dependent on seed distribution. This includes interaction with insects, habitat, and weather conditions.

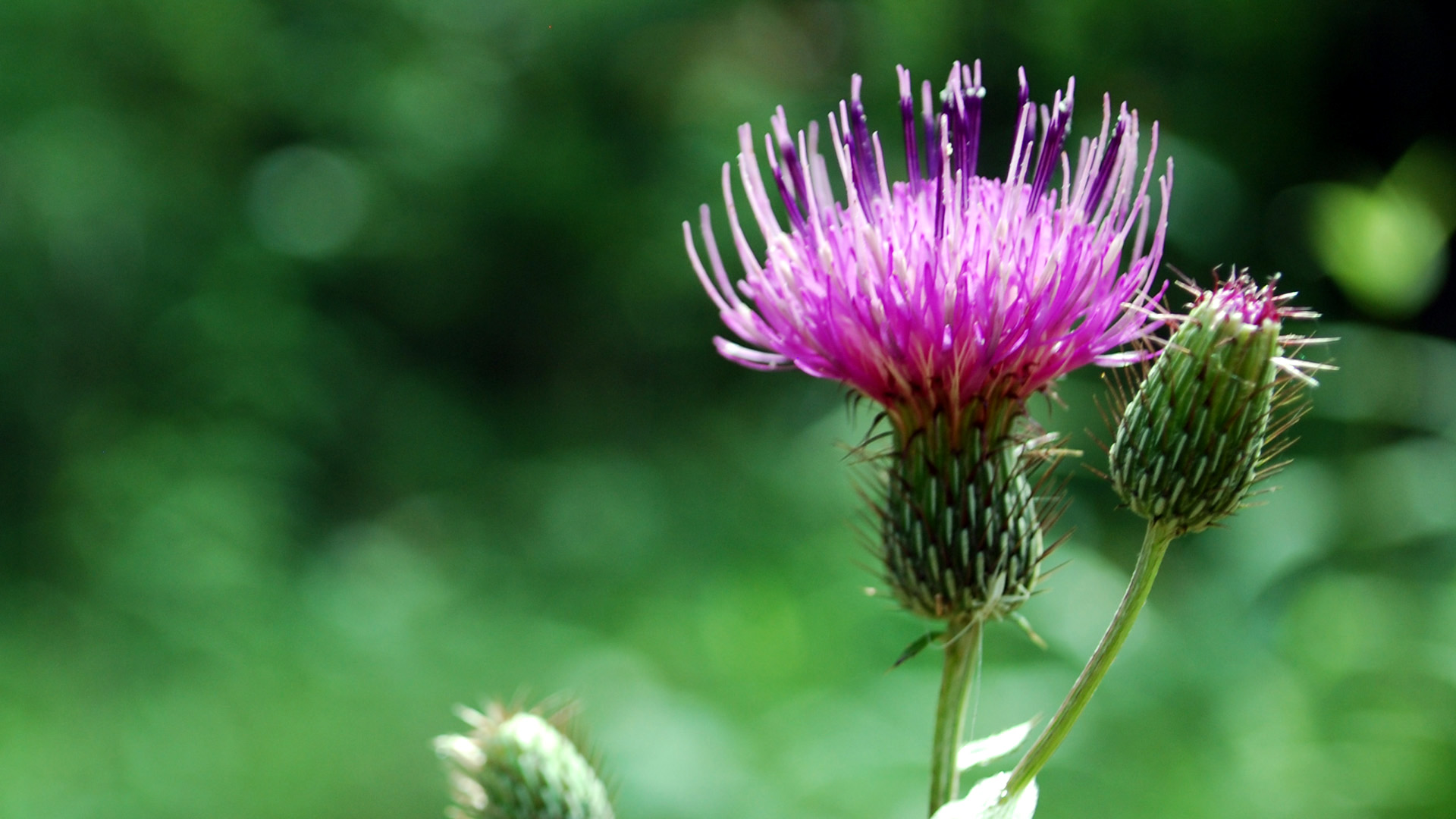
A field thistle (Cirsium discolor) in summer

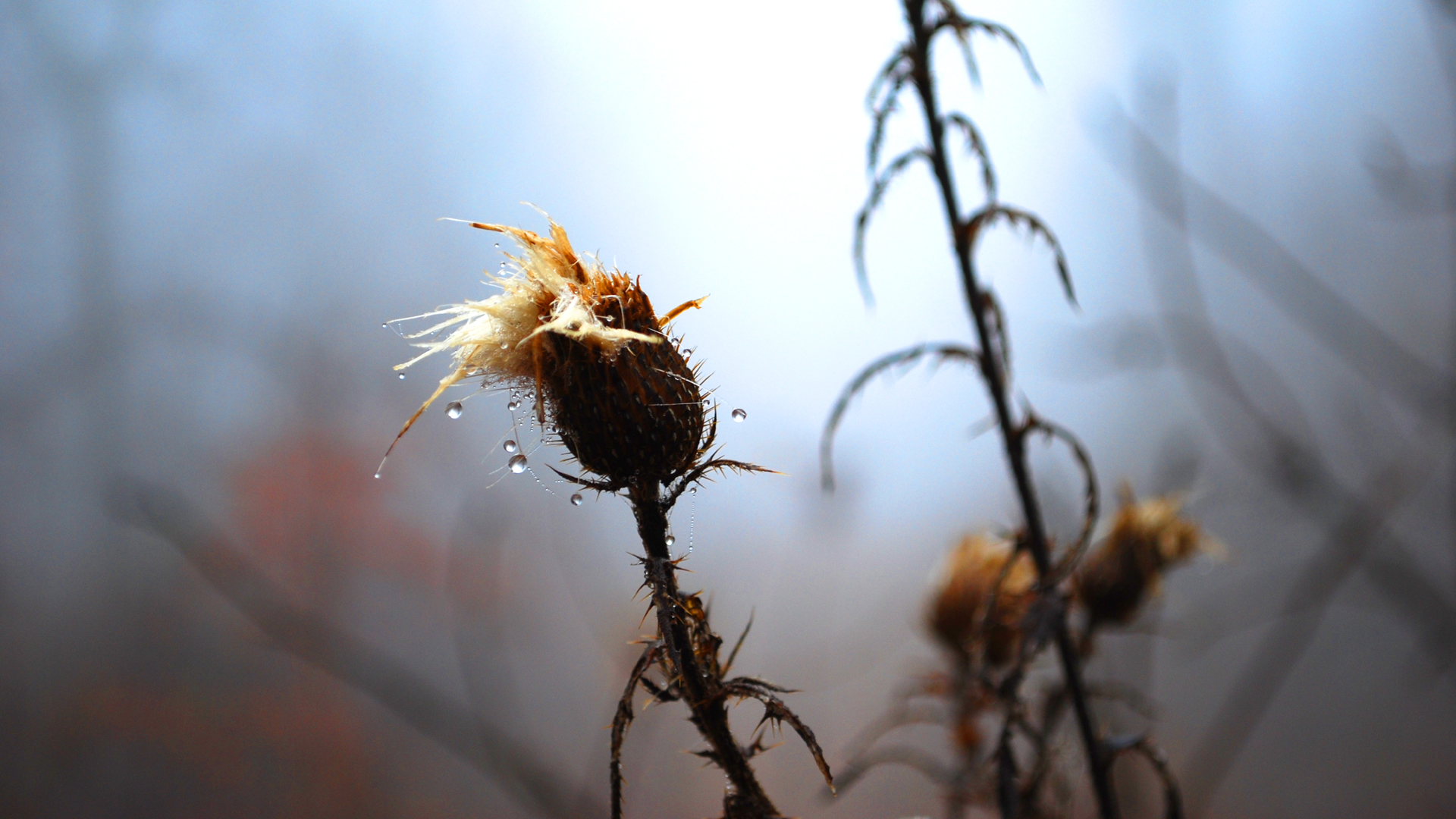
A field thistle (Cirsium discolor) in autumn

== Uses ==
The flower heads, when mashed, have been reported to release a substance that acts similarly to rennin and can curdle milk to aid in the production of cheese.
