= Șandra =

- Commune
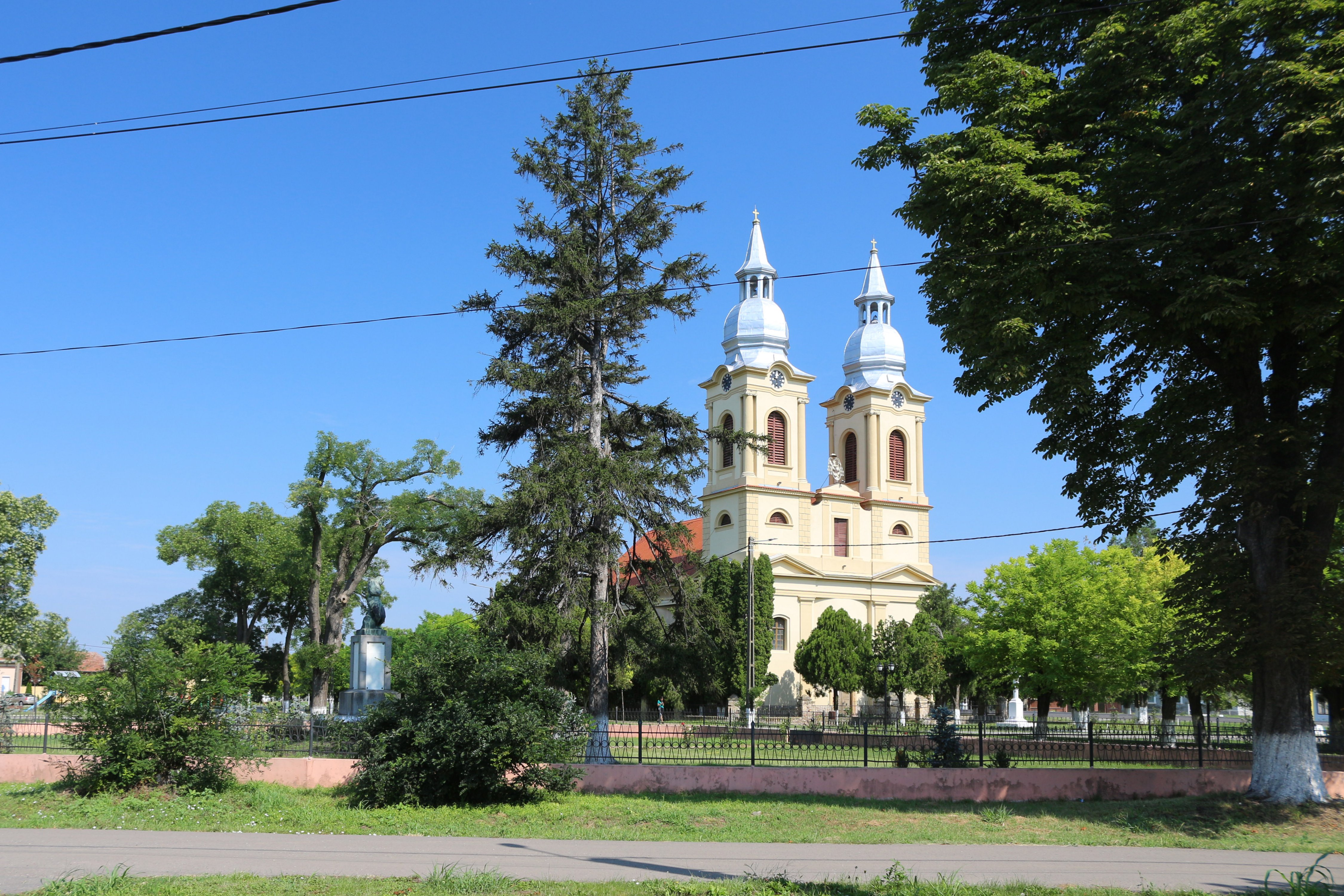
- The Roman Catholic church in the center of Șandra

- Location in Timiș County

- Location in Romania
- Coordinates: 45.925°N 20.8903°E
- Country: Romania
- County: Timiș
- Established: 1833 (Alexandria)

Government
  - Mayor (2024–): Natanael Savu (PSD)
- Area: 54.86 km^{2} (21.18 sq mi)
- Population (2021-12-01): 2,931
  - Density: 53.43/km^{2} (138.4/sq mi)
- Time zone: UTC+02:00 (EET)
  - Summer (DST): UTC+03:00 (EEST)
- Postal code: 307061–307065
- Vehicle reg.: TM
- Website: primariasandra.ro

Șandra (until 1882 Alexandria; German: Alexanderhausen; Banat Swabian: Schanderhaas; Hungarian: Sándorháza) is a commune in Timiș County, Romania. It is composed of two villages, Șandra (commune seat) and Uihei. These were part of Biled commune until 2004, when they were split off.

== Geography ==
The total area of Șandra commune is about 5,486 ha (13,560 acres), of which 492.23 ha (1,216.3 acres) represents the built-up area. Local natural resources are oil, natural gas and hot springs. The neighboring localities of the commune are Variaș, Biled, Iecea Mare, Satchinez, Bulgăruș and Lovrin.

=== Climate ===
The climate is continental with weak Mediterranean influences. It has a temperate character (the annual average being 10.5 °C or 50.9 °F), with warm summers, not-too-cold winters, quite early springs and sometimes very long autumns. The average annual rainfall is 520 mm (20 in), with variations from 366 to 732 mm (14.4 to 28.8 in). Most of the precipitation falls in the spring–summer period, in the months of May–August. The prevailing wind is the austru, which blows almost all year round, felt acutely by both residents and crops, especially due to the lack of a forested area of protection.

=== Flora and fauna ===
The plain area is used for various crops: wheat, corn, barley, oat, rye, legumes, textiles, oilseeds and other industrial plants, vegetables and fodder plants, orchards with fruit trees and vines.

The dominant vegetation is grassy. The tree vegetation is characterized by the presence of black locust, mulberry and poplar, and that of shrubs by blackthorn and hawthorn. The most common and harmful to crops weeds are: field thistle, blackberry, cornflower, poppies, orache, and lately sorghum has spread.

In terms of fauna, this area is suitable for ground squirrel, hamster, steppe polecat, hare, and among the bird species can be mentioned: skylark, quail, partridge, pheasant, starling and roller.

== History ==
=== Șandra ===
In 1801 the territory of today's Șandra was mentioned in Austrian documents as an abandoned village, praedium, under the control of the Roman Catholic Diocese of Zagreb. The colonization of the praedium began in 1833; it was initially called Alexandria, after the Roman Catholic bishop of Zagreb, Alexander Alagovics, who had a property of almost 7,000 jugers there. On 1 January, the bishop signed a contract allowing the 140 families of German settlers from neighboring localities to settle on his estate and establish the locality that would bear his name. Shortly afterwards, work began on the construction of the settlement, following the canons of the German settlements with straight and perpendicular streets. Of the 146 allocated house plots there were 101 farmhouses built, two houses for the bishop's administration, 38 cottages without fields, one presbytery, one school, one pub and two mills. The 140 families represented a total of about 700 settlers and came from Biled, Bulgăruș, Carani, Cenad, Comloșu Mic, Gottlob, Grabaț, Iecea Mare, Iecea Mică, Lenauheim, Lovrin, Nakovo (Serbia), Nerău, Nițchidorf, Sânandrei, Sânnicolau Mare, Tomnatic, Variaș and Vizejdia. Three years later, in 1836, the church was built. In 1842 there were already 1,231 Germans, 16 Serbs and Romanians.

In 1884 the village got a railway connection (Timișoara–Cenad). In 1893 it was granted the right to hold a weekly fair. In 1929, the Volunteer Fire Brigade was established. In 1933, a monument dedicated to those who fell in World War I was inaugurated in the center of the village.

With the retreat of the German army, Șandra was the scene of fighting during World War II. In 1945, 174 people were deported to the Soviet Union; 29 died there. A total of 217 people lost their lives in World War II (i.e., 163 in the German army, 37 in the Romanian army and 17 civilians) and all ethnic Germans were expropriated. Another consequence of the war was the deportation of many inhabitants from the Yugoslavian border area, to which Șandra belonged, to the Bărăgan Steppes. The deportation took place during the night of 17/18 June 1951. The number of deportees was largely dependent on the local authorities. Seventeen families were deported from Șandra. During the second half of 1955 some families were allowed to leave their enforced imprisonment and return home.

Electricity was introduced in 1955, and drinking water in 1974. Crude oil was discovered here in 1968; soon the first drilling rigs and pumpjacks appeared.

=== Uihei ===
Uihei is one of the newest settler villages in Banat. It was founded in 1844, more than a hundred years after the beginning of the colonizations, by the inhabitants of other surrounding villages (Grabaț, Bulgăruș, Lenauheim, Iecea Mare, Șandra), but also from other villages in Banat. Most of the early settlers were tobacco growers.

From the very beginning, the construction plans of the village were very specific, the lots for houses were divided equally, the houses had to be neatly arranged and subject to strict rules, with the typical facades of Swabian houses facing the street. The land areas were quite limited and were leased under fairly strict conditions. These conditions were eliminated with the revolution of 1848, which allowed the development of the settlement. A period of prosperity followed, which remained relatively constant, independent of the political changes in Banat. It was abruptly interrupted by World War II. Deportations to USSR followed, then deportations to Bărăgan and finally collectivization. This dealt a severe blow to locals, mostly Germans, who were successfully engaged in agriculture. Both their houses and their lands became state property. Shortly afterwards, however, the ownership of the houses was again recognized to the rightful owners. A period of relative growth followed, the village was connected to the electricity grid, the roads were repaired, the infrastructure was generally improved. Between 1951–1956, 22 people were deported from Uihei to Bărăgan, relatively few compared to other localities in Banat.

In the 1980s, the situation began to deteriorate again, culminating in the 1989 revolution. Immediately after the revolution, there was a massive emigration of ethnic Germans to Germany. Four years later, in 1994, on the 150th anniversary of its founding, only one ethnic German lived in Uihei. The German population was gradually replaced by the Romanian population, but the evolution of the population remained steadily declining. The 2000s brought a trend reversal. The 2002 census saw the first increase in population in almost 50 years.

== Demographics ==
Ethnic composition (2021)
1. Romanians (92.5%)
2. Unknown (5.62%)
3. Others (1.93%)
Religious composition (2021)
1. Orthodox (81.3%)
2. Pentecostals (11.8%)
3. Unknown (5.93%)
4. Others (0.98%)

Șandra had a population of 2,931 inhabitants at the 2021 census, up 1.7% from the 2011 census. Most inhabitants are Romanians (92.45%). For 5.62% of the population, ethnicity is unknown. By religion, most inhabitants are Orthodox (81.26%), with a minority of Pentecostals (11.83%). For 5.93% of the population, religious affiliation is unknown.

Census		Ethnic composition
Year	Population	Romanians	Hungarians	Germans
1880	2,812	20	64	2,705
1890	2,930	58	76	2,776
1900	2,763	76	108	2,565
1910	2,463	37	183	2,238
1920	2,422	43	26	2,347
1930	2,454	72	62	2,306
1941	2,363	95	60	2,189
1956	2,345	–	–	–
1966	2,709	1,412	54	1,208
1977	2,773	1,778	52	908
1992	2,650	2,504	28	103
2002	2,782	2,690	18	50
2011	2,882	2,729	13	19
2021	2,931	2,710	12	15

== Politics and administration ==
The commune of Șandra is administered by a mayor and a local council composed of 13 councilors. The mayor, Natanael Savu, from the Social Democratic Party, has been in office since 2024. As from the 2024 local elections, the local council has the following composition by political parties:

Party	Seats	Composition
Social Democratic Party–National Liberal Party	6	
Alliance for the Union of Romanians	3	
Force of the Right	2	
Social Liberal Humanist Party	1	
Strong Romania Party	1	
