= William S. Darling =

Hungarian-American art director (1882–1963)

- Born: Vilmos Béla Sándorházi; 14 September 1882; Sándorháza, Transylvania, Kingdom of Hungary, Austro-Hungarian Empire (present-day, since 1920 Șandra, Romania)
- Died: 15 December 1963 (aged 81); Laguna Beach, California, U.S.
- Occupations: Art director, painter
- Years active: 1921–1954

William S. Darling (born Vilmos Béla Sándorházi; 14 September 1882 – 15 December 1963) was a Hungarian-American art director who was prominent in Hollywood during the 1920s and 30s. Darling received six Academy Award nominations, winning three times. He was inducted into the American Art Directors Guild (ADG) Hall of Fame in 2012. According to the ADG, Darling was one of the "most influential designers in the early days of Hollywood's Golden Age."

== Early and education ==
Darling was born Vilmos Béla Sándorházi (also Adalbert Sandorhazi) in Sándorháza, Austria-Hungary. He initially studied architecture because of his father's wishes, but later switched to the Budapest Academy of Fine Arts where he studied painting. He continued his studies on scholarship at the Ecole des Beaux Arts in Paris, France.

== Career ==
In 1910, Darling immigrated to New York City using the name Adalbert Sandorhazi. He successfully pursued a career as a portrait artist. He changed his name from Sándorházi to Darling during World War I when his wife suggested he adopt her maiden name to avoid the foreign sound. Around 1920 he moved to Southern California where he began work as an art designer on films and soon became the head of the art department at 20th Century Fox. Darling worked on 61 films between 1921 and 1954. His notable work includes the John Ford-directed films The Iron Horse (1924), Judge Priest (1934) and The Prisoner of Shark Island (1936); the Academy Award-winning film adaptation of the Noël Coward's play Cavalcade (1933); and The Rains Came (1939) with Tyrone Power and Myrna Loy.

Darling was nominated six times between 1934 and 1947 in the category Best Art Direction. He won the Oscar for Cavalcade, The Song of Bernadette (1943) and Anna and the King of Siam (1946).

Darling was a fellow of the American Academy of the Fine Arts. In 2012, the American Art Director's Guild inducted Darling into its Hall of Fame.

== Personal life ==
Darling was first married in Hungary and had two children, William and Imre. On 2 February 1915, he married Gwendolin Darling in New York City. They remarried on 19 November 1937 in Phoenix, Arizona. Gwendolin died in April 1955 in Palm Springs, California. In 1957, Darling married the portrait artist Marjory Adams. They lived in Laguna Beach, California where he was a noted member of the art community and a life member of the Laguna Beach Art Association. He died on 15 December 1963 at his home in Laguna Beach, California.

== Selected filmography ==
- The Iron Horse (1924)
- Cavalcade (1933) - won Academy Award
- Judge Priest (1934)
- The Prisoner of Shark Island (1936)
- Lloyd's of London (1936) - nominated for Academy Award
- Wee Willie Winkie (1937)
- The Rains Came (1939) - nominated for Academy Award
- The Song of Bernadette (1943) - won for Academy Award
- The Keys of the Kingdom (1944) - nominated for Academy Award
- Anna and the King of Siam (1946) - won Academy Award

== See also ==
- Art Directors Guild Hall of Fame
