= Krauszer's =

American convenience store chain

Krauszer’s
- Company type: Private
- Industry: Retail (Convenience stores)
- Founded: 1960; 66 years ago
- Founder: Jacob Krauszer
- Headquarters: Edison, New Jersey, United States
- Area served: New Jersey, Connecticut, Maryland
- Key people: H. R. “Harry” Shah

Krauszer’s is an American chain of convenience stores based in Edison, New Jersey.

== History ==
John Krauszer, an ethnic German native of then Billed, Austria-Hungary (now in Timiș County, Romania), started a dairy bottling and delivery business in New Brunswick, New Jersey, in 1911 with a capacity of 40 quarts per day. His brother Peter took over in 1917 as production grew to 700 quarts, and after John's death in 1921, capacity reached 4,000 quarts by 1925. That year, Conrad Decker joined as partner, forming the Krauszer-Decker Dairy Company, but the partnership ended in June 1926. George Krauszer took over the firm in 1940. Ice cream manufacturing began in 1947. Around 1956, Jacob Krauszer founded Krauszer Vending Inc., which operated vending machines that dispensed milk in quart and half-gallon containers.

In 1960, Krauszer's inaugurated its first dairy store. By 1967, Krauszer's operated 40 convenience stores across Middlesex Somerset, Monmouth, and Ocean counties, and managed 200 milk vending machines.

The 1960s and 1970s saw continued growth, and in the 1970s and 1980s the company began to acquire smaller companies. Krauszer’s acquired Garden State Farms (with 79 New Jersey stores and 2 New York stores) in 1979, increasing its total to 164 locations. In 1986, Krauszer’s acquired 52 Somerset Farms stores in New Jersey, bringing their store count to 204. The same year, Krauszer’s acquired Hubbard’s Cupboard, Inc., a 36-store chain in New Jersey. All locations were then rebranded as Krauszer’s.

In early 1987, the United States Department of Labor brought suit against Dairy Stores Inc. and its president Jacob Krauszer for failure to comply with minimum wage and overtime compensation requirements. In December 1987, Krauszer’s agreed to pay about $4.4 million in a settlement to roughly 20,000 current and former employees who had worked there between April 1979 and January 1988, without admitting liability.

Dairy Stores Inc. was acquired in 1988 through a leveraged buyout by a group of its executives and a financial corporation based in Delaware. At the time the company operated 229 stores in northern and central New Jersey. In 1989, fifteen outdated locations—including those at Bound Brook, Edison, Manville, Piscataway, South Plainfield, Rocky Hill, and Woodbridge—were closed. Also in 1989, the milk and fruit juice processing plant was closed. Milk was thereafter supplied by Tuscan Dairy and Johanna Farms.

In late 1989, Dairy Stores Inc. transferred ownership to Andrew Kerstein for an undisclosed amount. Krauszer’s began selling milk products under its label again, this time with production handled by Tuscan Dairy.

Krauszer’s filed for Chapter 11 bankruptcy in 1990 and closed 20 of its 158 stores, reporting $36.1 million in assets and $40.5 million in liabilities for Dairy Stores Inc. In 1991, the bankruptcy court approved the sale of 35 out of a total of 135 Krauszer’s stores.

In mid-1991, Andrew Kerstein resigned as president and CEO of Krauszer’s Food Stores to start Andy K’s Dairy and Deli, an 11-store chain—10 of which were former Krauszer’s locations in Middlesex and Monmouth counties. Martin H. Kern succeeded him as president and CEO. Later that year, Business Connections Inc. of Secaucus, New Jersey, led by H. R. “Harry” Shah, acquired Krauszer’s Food Stores’ 82 stores, planned to sell 30, add 40 Shopper’s Express locations, and continue expanding.

Late in 1991, the Bankruptcy Court authorized a Chapter 11 reorganization, with over $18 million distributed to creditors.

In 1996, Krauszer’s acquired all 22 Wawa stores in Connecticut, expanding its presence beyond 32 company-owned and 200 cooperative-owned stores in New Jersey.
