= Variaș oil field =

Oil field in Timiș County, Romania

Variaș
- Country: Romania
- Region: Timiș County
- Offshore/onshore: onshore
- Operator: Petrom

Field history
- Discovery: 1968
- Start of development: 1968
- Start of production: 1970

Production
- Current production of oil: 1,000 barrels per day (~50,000 t/a)
- Estimated oil in place: 5.4 million tonnes (~ 6×10^{6} m^{3} or 40 million bbl)

The Variaș oil field is an oil field located in Variaș, Timiș County. It was discovered in 1968 and developed by Petrom. It began production in 1970 and produces oil. The total proven reserves of the Variaș oil field are around 40 million barrels (5.4 million tonnes), and production is centered on 1,000 barrels per day (160 m^{3}/d).
