= Comloșu Mare =

- Commune
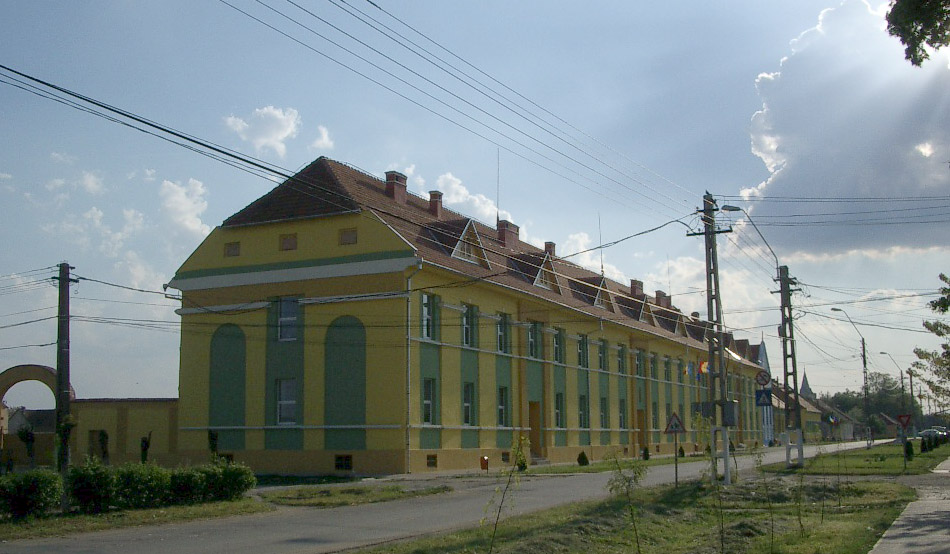
- Main road

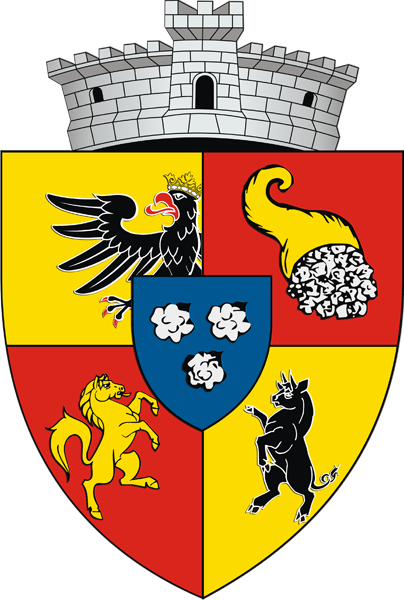
- Coat of arms

- Location in Timiș County

- Location in Romania
- Coordinates: 45°53′N 20°38′E
- Country: Romania
- County: Timiș

Government
  - Mayor (2020–): Ovidiu-Nicolae Ștefănescu (PSD)
- Area: 101.42 km^{2} (39.16 sq mi)
- Elevation: 81 m (266 ft)
- Population (2021-12-01): 4,892
  - Density: 48.24/km^{2} (124.9/sq mi)
- Time zone: UTC+02:00 (EET)
  - Summer (DST): UTC+03:00 (EEST)
- Postal code: 307120–307122
- Vehicle reg.: TM
- Website: www.comlosumare.ro

Comloșu Mare (German: Großkomlosch; Hungarian: Nagykomlós; Serbian: Велики Комлуш, romanized: Veliki Komluš) is a commune in Timiș County, Romania. It is composed of three villages: Comloșu Mare (commune seat), Comloșu Mic and Lunga.

== Name ==
Comloșu Mare has been known throughout history under several names: Conuș, Conaș, Comloșul Bănățean, Comlăușul Mare or Comloș (in Romanian); Nagykomlós and Bánátkomlós (in Hungarian); Велики Комлуш/Veliki Komluš (in Serbian); Großkomlosch, Komlosch or Großhopfendorf (in German).

Comloșu Mic was known as Ostern in German, Osztern and Kiskomlós in Hungarian and Мали Комлуш/Mali Komluš in Serbian. The current form, Comloșu Mic, is retaken after 1918 from the Hungarian toponym Kiskomlós, originally used by the Austro-Hungarian administration.

Lunga was founded in 1824. Originally known as Constanța, the village was named in honor of Constanze Nákó de Nagyszentmiklós, the widow of Joseph Nákó de Nagyszentmiklós. The name Constanța was used until 1888, when Hungarian officials turn it into Kunszőllős. The toponym Constanța was retaken between 1909 and 1921, after which in 1930, it was given the official name Lunga (which means 'long' in Romanian) because the village stretches for a length of 4 km (2.5 mi).

== Geography ==
Comloșu Mare is located on the northwestern border of Romanian Banat and borders the communes of Gottlob, Lenauheim and Teremia Mare and the town of Jimbolia. The territory of the commune forms the state border with Serbia. Comloșu Mare is located in the plain area of Mureș, having some depressions left by the routes of Galatea and Soltur valleys that have dried up.

=== Climate ===
The climate receives Mediterranean influences from the south, having a temperate character (the average annual temperature is 10.5 °C), with warm summers, not too cold winters, quite early springs and sometimes very long autumns. The average annual precipitation is 520 mm (20 in), and ranges from 366 to 732 mm (14.4 to 28.8 in). Most of the precipitation falls between May and August, with torrential rains accompanied by hail. The dominant wind is the austru, which blows almost all year round.

=== Flora and fauna ===
The dominant vegetation is grassy. The arboreal vegetation is characterized by the presence of locusts, mulberries and poplars, and that of shrubs by blackthorns and hawthorns. The most common and harmful to crops weeds are Cirsium arvense (field thistle), Rubus fruticosus (blackberry), Centaurea cyanus (cornflower), Papaver spp. (poppies), Atriplex hortensis (orache), and lately sorghum has spread. The plain area is used for various crops: wheat, maize, barley, oat, rye, legumes, textiles, oilseeds and other industrial plants, vegetables and fodder plants, orchards with fruit trees and vines.

In terms of fauna, this area is suitable for susliks, hamsters, steppe polecats, hares and, among the bird species, larks, quails, partridges, pheasants, starlings and rollers. Locusts, crickets and other insects are found in large numbers.

== History ==
The first recorded mention of Comloșu Mare dates from 1446, when the toponym Komlós is mentioned in a Hungarian diploma. By 1453, John Hunyadi had properties here. After the defeat of the Hungarian army at Mohács in 1526, the Ottomans occupied Hungary and Banat. Following Bey Bali's campaign in 1529, several localities, including Comloșu Mare, were destroyed by the Ottoman troops. Two centuries followed in which the Ottomans devastated the settlement many times, which led to its depopulation. By 1552, Comloșu Mare was part of the Sanjak of Çanad. In the Turkish defter from 1557 to 1558 two villages are mentioned: Comloș with three houses and Comloșu Vechi ("Old Comloș") with nine houses, both inhabited by Romanians and Serbs.

After the victory in Zenta in 1697 of Prince Eugene of Savoy over the Ottoman army, several families of Serbian shepherds settled here, so that the 1717 census recorded 20 dwellings in the village of Comleusch, in the district of Timișoara. Under the Habsburgs, starting with 1716, when the district organization was introduced, Comloșu Mare belonged to Cenad. Between 1734 and 1740, several Oltenian families arrived in the village from Craiova, Slatina and Polovragi, who took refuge here to escape the Turkish incursions from Oltenia. During this period, Bulgarian settlers from Vinga also appeared. In the autumn of 1743, a group of Oltenian refugees arrived in the village, and in 1745 other Romanian families came from Vinga. With the help of the Romanians from Oltenia, the Austrian administrators rebuilt the roads and the canalization and drainage systems of the swamps both in the commune and in the neighboring localities. Starting with 1779, when Banat was incorporated into Hungary and the county organization was introduced, Comloșu Mare was part of the Torontál County, with the seat at Nagybecskerek (present-day Zrenjanin, Serbia).

In 1770–1771, on the outskirts of Comloșu Mare, Comloșu Mic was founded, under the direct guidance of the regional director for colonization, Hildebrand (a native of Timișoara), through the contribution of German and French settlers brought from Alsace, Lorraine and the Black Forest. The German name of the village was Ostern, as it was founded at Easter.

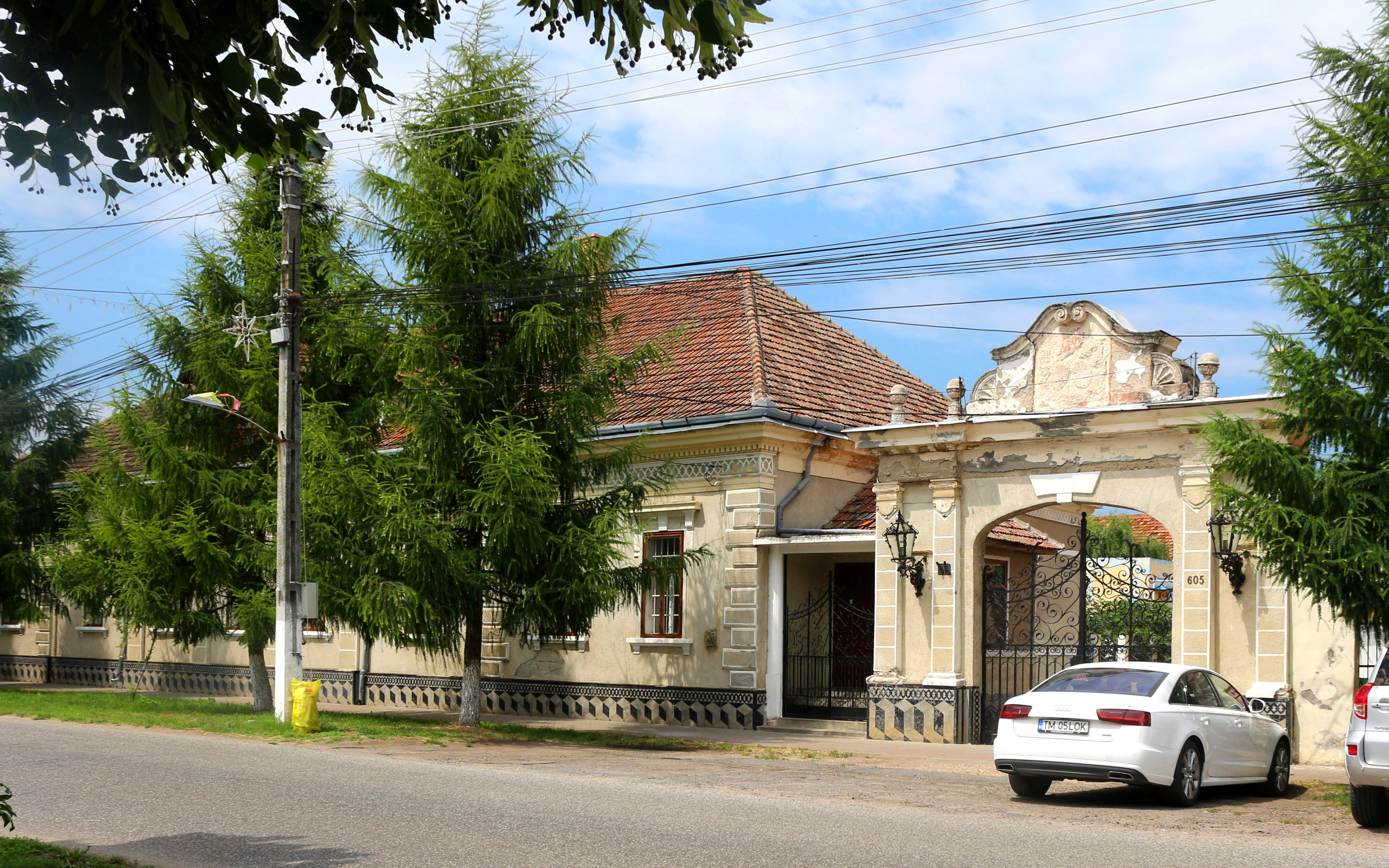
San Marco Mansion in Comloșu Mare

In 1781, Comloșu Mare was bought by two wealthy merchants and entrepreneurs, brothers Christoph and Kyrill Nákó from the Aromanian Nákó family. They begin to colonize other populations here as well. Thus, in 1782, they brought here several families of Lutheran Slovaks from Békés County, who did not stay long and left in 1788 for Stamora. Germans from Upper Hungary and Luxembourg began to settle here in 1771. In 1840, Johann Nákó, Kyrill's grandson, built a mansion in Comloșu Mare, which would later be known as the San Marco Mansion. It was used as a permanent residence and also included a theater with a permanent season (in the summer of 1868 Mihai Eminescu also stopped here) and a Viennese-style park; the park was cleared and turned into a football field and base for agricultural machinery during communism. Johann Nákó's only heiress, daughter Mileva, became Duchess of San Marco by marriage. After the Duke's death in 1888, the Duchess devoted herself to charitable causes. In 1889 she called the Daughters of Charity of Saint Vincent de Paul to Comloșu Mare, for whom she had a monastery built with rooms for a girls' boarding school and an educational wing.

In 1824, the village of Lunga was founded on the estate of Count Johann Nákó. He decided to set up a settlement to stabilize the labor force he needed for his estate. He divided the land into lots of houses, which he gave to 138 Romanian families and 100 German families, all of which were used for agricultural work on Nákó's estate. As in Comoloșu Mare, the Romanians who were colonized here were Oltenians from the Old Kingdom.

== Demographics ==
Ethnic composition (2021)
1. Romanians (79.0%)
2. Roma (11.9%)
3. Germans (1.14%)
4. Unknown (7.05%)
5. Others (0.86%)
Religious composition (2021)
1. Orthodox (71.8%)
2. Pentecostals (7.60%)
3. Greek Catholics (6.31%)
4. Roman Catholics (5.64%)
5. Unknown (7.25%)
6. Others (1.01%)
7. Irreligious, atheists and agnostics (0.38%)

Comloșu Mare had a population of 4,892 inhabitants at the 2021 census, up 3.27% from the 2011 census. Most inhabitants are Romanians (79%), larger minorities being represented by Roma (11.95%) and Germans (1.14%). For 7.05% of the population, ethnicity is unknown. By religion, most inhabitants are Orthodox (71.81%), but there are also minorities of Pentecostals (7.6%), Greek Catholics (6.31%) and Roman Catholics (5.64%). For 7.25% of the population, religious affiliation is unknown.

Census		Ethnic composition
Year	Population	Romanians	Hungarians	Germans	Roma	Serbs	Slovaks
1880	8,157	3,827	111	3,961	–	51	11
1890	8,518	3,940	80	4,160	–	55	6
1900	8,015	3,545	128	4,029	–	35	1
1910	7,620	3,647	199	3,434	–	27	3
1920	5,977 (Note: Data on Comloșu Mic's population missing)	3,957	57	1,598	–	–	–
1930	6,920	3,527	54	2,993	311	15	–
1941	6,483	3,344	51	2,768	–	–	–
1956	5,787	3,439	62	1,899	367	10	1
1966	6,050	4,076	67	1,785	73	13	1
1977	5,906	3,820	62	1,492	493	15	9
1992	4,664	3,432	55	258	813	22	74
2002	4,806	3,564	52	151	949	15	59
2011	4,737	3,444	62	114	860	15	51
2021	4,892	3,865	18	56	585	–	17

== Politics and administration ==
The commune of Comloșu Mare is administered by a mayor and a local council composed of 15 councilors. The mayor, Ovidiu-Nicolae Ștefănescu, from the Social Democratic Party, has been in office since 2020. As from the 2024 local elections, the local council has the following composition by political parties:

Party	Seats	Composition
Social Democratic Party	10	
National Liberal Party	3	
Alliance for the Union of Romanians	2	

== Culture ==
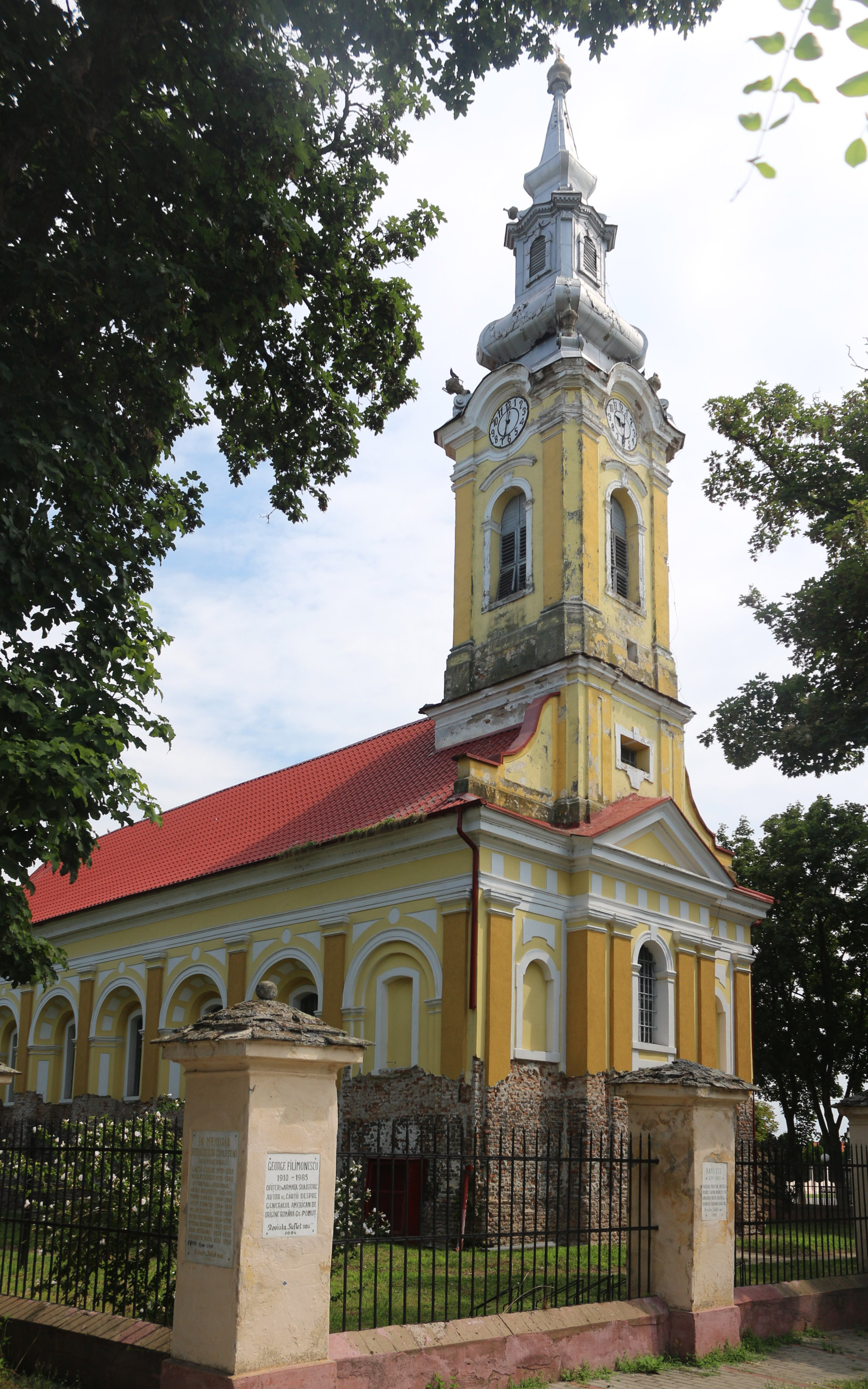
The Orthodox church in Comloșu Mare, built in 1796

The cultural activity takes place in the three existing cultural centers in the three villages. In Comloșu Mare, the Iulian Grozescu National House has a capacity of 400 seats in the performance hall, a 60-seat conference room, kitchen and locker rooms. The building is a historical monument, once home to the post chaise between Kikinda and Budapest. The cultural center in Comloșu Mic has a capacity of 200 seats, while the cultural center in Lunga has 150 seats. There is also a communal library with a collection of 8,000 volumes.

The spiritual life is represented by several Christian denominations: Orthodox, Roman Catholic, Greek Catholic, Baptist and Pentecostal. There are eight churches, of which three Orthodox, two Roman Catholic, one Greek Catholic, one Baptist and one Pentecostal.

Magazines and publications have a longstanding tradition in Comloșu Mare. Suflet nou ("New Soul") is the longest-lived rural cultural publication in Romania. The magazine was founded in 1934 by lawyer Andrei Bălan and has been published monthly since then. Comloșanu is another local publication written and edited by a group of young volunteers; it appears since 2001 with a quarterly frequency. There is also a children's theater troupe, Neghiniță Junior, where teachers, volunteers and children work. Annually, the Femina club presents plays staged by its female volunteers.

== Notable people ==
- Iulian Grozescu (1839–1872), poet and journalist
- Arthur Biedl (1869–1933), pathologist
- Anna Sage (1889–1947), prostitute and brothel owner ("Woman in Red")
- Hans Diplich (1909–1990), poet and writer
- Vasile Chiroiu (1910–1976), football player
- William Totok (b. 1951), writer
