= Periam =

- Commune
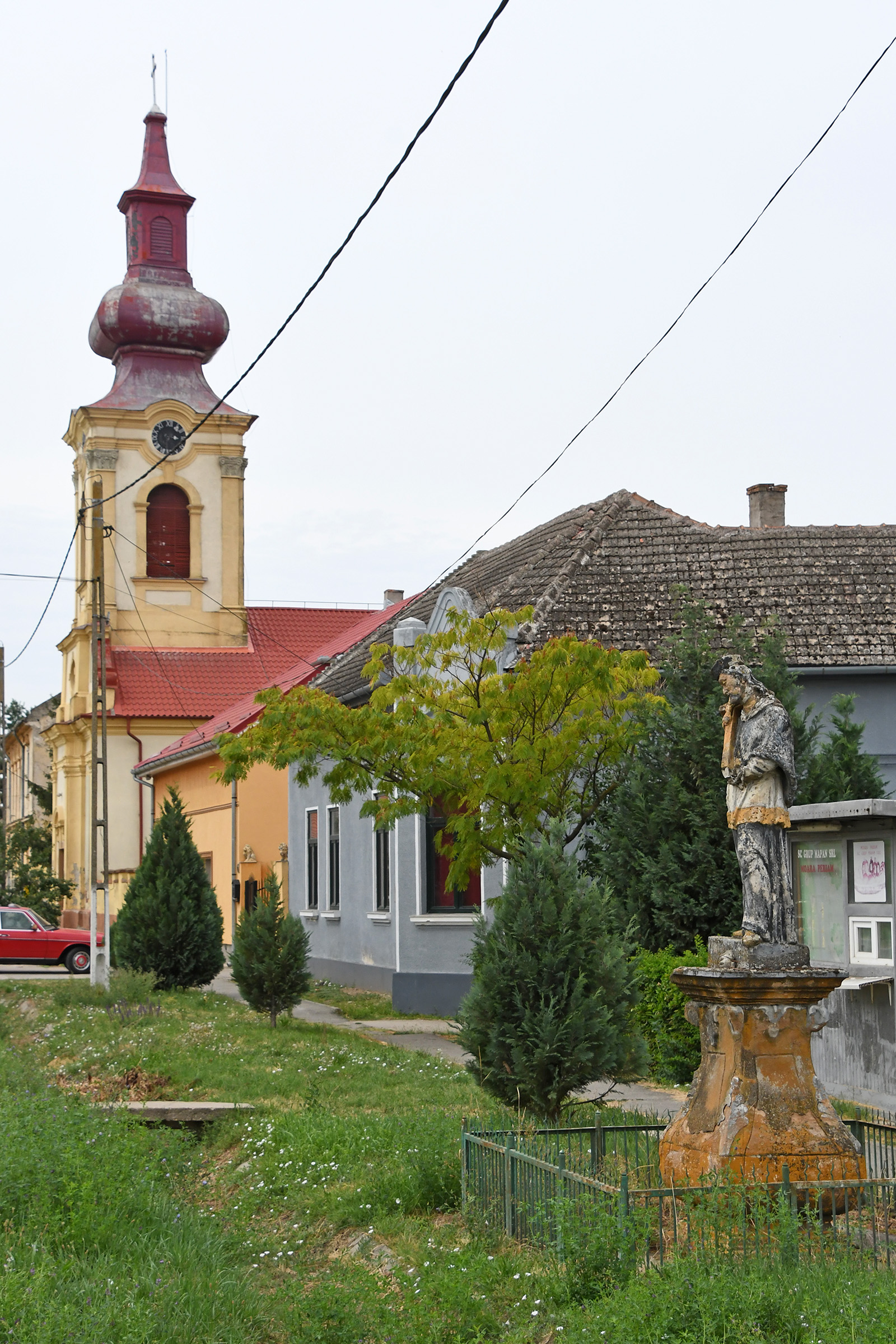
- The church and statue of John of Nepomuk in Periam

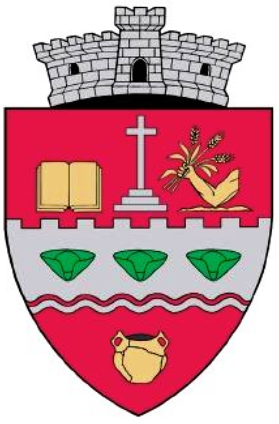
- Coat of arms

- Location in Timiș County
- Interactive map of Periam
- Location in Romania
- Coordinates: 46°3′N 20°52′E
- Country: Romania
- County: Timiș

Government
  - Mayor (2012–): Cornel Dumitraș (PSD)
- Area: 64.47 km^{2} (24.89 sq mi)
- Population (2021-12-01): 4,196
  - Density: 65.08/km^{2} (168.6/sq mi)
- Time zone: UTC+02:00 (EET)
  - Summer (DST): UTC+03:00 (EEST)
- Postal code: 307315
- Vehicle reg.: TM
- Website: primatimperiam.ro

Periam (until 1925 Periamoș; German: Perjamosch; Hungarian: Perjámos; Serbian: Перјамош, romanized: Perjamoš) is a commune in Timiș County, Romania. It is composed of a single village, Periam, and also included Pesac until it broke off as a separate commune in 2007.

== Geography ==
Periam is located in the northwest of the Banat Plain, in a subdivision of the Mureș Plain called Aranca Plain. It borders Șeitin and Semlac (Arad County) to the north, Satu Mare (Arad County) to the east, Sânpetru Mic to the southeast, Pesac to the south and Sânpetru Mare to the west.

=== Relief ===
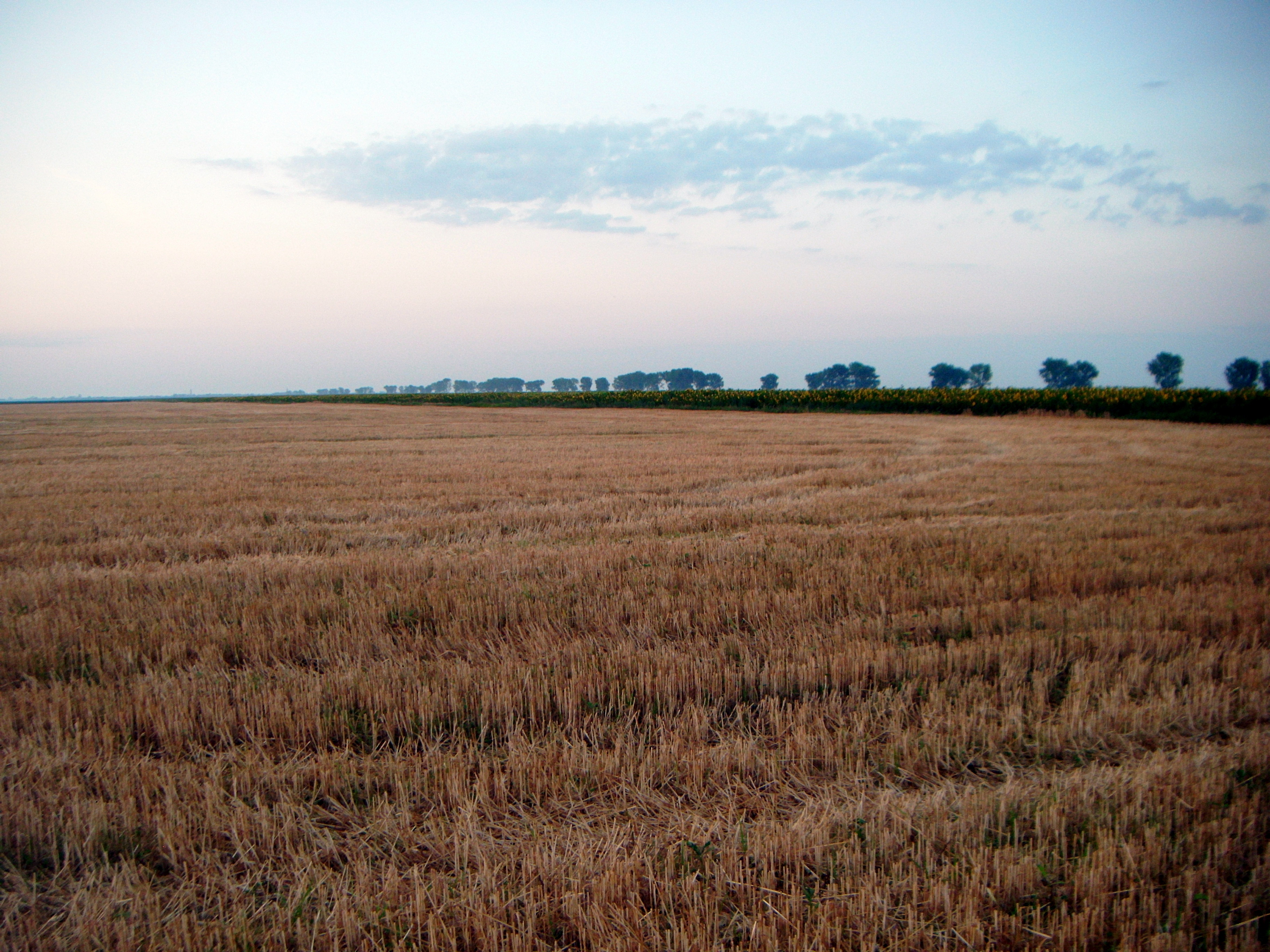
Aranca Plain as seen from Periam

The relief is determined by the Aranca Plain, which represents a wide cone opening of the Mureș Meadow, starting from Periam to the southwest, i.e. from the 90° bend of the Mureș, where the Vinga Plain would continue to the northwest with the Nădlac Plain. This plain is the newest and the lowest Mureș plain, on its center meandering Aranca which still has its origin in the Mureș Meadow, at Sânpetru German (south of Pecica). The altitudes in this area stand at 85 m (279 ft), on some ridges rising to 90 m (300 ft).

=== Hydrography ===
The hydrographic network is represented by rivers and a system of canals that spread across the commune. Aranca is a river installed on the former riverbeds of Mureș, arranged on a wide area of digression, before damming. Irrigation systems were also built in its basin near Mureș at Periam, Sânpetru Mare, Sânnicolau Mare and Cenad. It has as a left tributary the Galațca, from Jimbolia Plain, which starts from Periam, an even older course of Mureș and which is generally supplied by pumping. The waters of Aranca are supplied by precipitation, from Mureș and from the drainage of the phreatic waters. Mureș – one of the largest rivers in Romania – flows about 5 km (3.1 mi) north of Periam. It forms the natural border of Periam with Arad County. Its average flow at Nădlac is 191 m^{3} (6,700 ft^{3}).

=== Climate ===
Periam commune and the surrounding area are located in the temperate climate zone, at approximately equal distance from the equator and pole. Overall, it has a temperate continental climate with Atlantic influences. The air temperature has a uniform surface distribution, with a value of the multiannual average temperature of 10.9 °C (51.6 °F). Atmospheric precipitation varies greatly from year to year, due to cyclonic activity and humid air invasions from the west, northwest and southeast. The annual amounts of atmospheric precipitation are between 267.7 and 699.1 mm (10.54 and 27.52 in). Due to this, there are frequent periods of drought.

=== Flora and fauna ===
The flora finds European, Eurasian and Pontic elements, with grassy, halophilous (which has a discontinuous development, being adapted to the regime of salts and high humidity from these lands), aquatic and segetal vegetation present here.

The fauna falls into the Palearctic region, the Pannonian subregion. The region has a Central European fauna, but with many elements of Pontic origin. Rodents, birds and reptiles have a significant share in this area.

== History ==
A necropolis from the first Iron Age (1st millennium BC) was discovered east of Periam. The culture that existed then in this region is known as the Periam–Pecica culture.

The first recorded mention of Periam dates from 1332, with the name Priamus, belonging to the Csanád County. The owner of the village was Bechey Imre, his adjunct being Blasius of Priamus. Between 1387–1437, under the reign of Sigismund of Luxembourg, Periam was declared a town. In 1514, the rebellious serfs led by Gheorghe Doja destroyed it. Not much later, Banat being conquered by the Turks, it became a sanjak seat. During the Turkish occupation, it was very depopulated, so that in 1657, according to historical evidence, it had only seven houses.

The modern history of Periam begins after the Austrians conquered Banat in 1717. The new administration led by Count Claude Florimond de Mercy then began an extensive program of colonization of Banat. The first wave of German (Swabian) colonists settled in Periam in 1723. They were from Lorraine, Nassau-Siegen and Trier. In 1749 a new wave of 200 colonists arrived in Periam. All this time, Romanians and Serbs were forced to leave, so Periam became a predominantly German locality. In 1761 there was a strong flood of the Mureș River, which determined the relocation of the hearth of the village to the present-day location. The old hearth was on the site of the former vineyards. Smaller groups of colonists settled here between 1756–1762, and the last more consistent wave was recorded between 1764–1765. Then came 71 German, French and Czech families from Trier, Nassau-Siegen, Czech lands, Styria, Lorraine and Alsace. In 1766 the construction of the Church of St. John of Nepomuk was completed, and in 1796 the town hall was built.

In the mid-19th century, the Bishop of Zagreb, Slovak-born Juraj Haulik, founded a separate settlement called Haulikfalva, which would later merge into the hearth of Periam. The Haulik Church in Periam was founded by Bishop Haulik and has been used since 2001 by the Romanian Greek Catholic Church.

== Demographics ==
Ethnic composition (2021)
1. Romanians (84.1%)
2. Roma (5.91%)
3. Germans (1.40%)
4. Unknown (7.14%)
5. Others (1.47%)
Religious composition (2021)
1. Orthodox (79.7%)
2. Roman Catholics (5.12%)
3. Pentecostals (4.71%)
4. Baptists (1.04%)
5. Unknown (7.55%)
6. Others (1.34%)
7. Irreligious, atheists and agnostics (0.50%)

Periam had a population of 4,196 inhabitants at the 2021 census, down 6.86% from the 2011 census. Most inhabitants are Romanians (84.08%), larger minorities being represented by Roma (5.91%) and Germans (1.4%). For 7.14% of the population, ethnicity is unknown. By religion, most inhabitants are Orthodox (79.74%), but there are also minorities of Roman Catholics (5.12%), Pentecostals (4.71%) and Baptists (1.04%). For 7.55% of the population, religious affiliation is unknown.

Census		Ethnic composition
Year	Population	Romanians	Hungarians	Germans	Roma	Serbs	Slovaks
1880	5,496	164	217	4,930	–	70	33
1890	5,953	174	190	5,388	119	51	18
1900	5,612	222	318	4,889	105	67	9
1910	5,348	287	488	4,309	115	98	51
1920	5,193	291	302	4,397	–	–	–
1930	5,147	454	394	4,047	138	65	18
1941	5,050	568	390	3,823	–	–	–
1956	5,264	–	–	–	–	–	–
1966	5,513	3,365	232	1,768	96	30	7
1977	5,500	3,806	205	1,431	19	25	6
1992	4,589	3,918	141	289	192	29	3
2002	4,464	3,915	122	160	202	37	4
2011	4,505	3,770	71	97	333	30	–
2021	4,196	3,528	30	59	248	14	–

== Politics and administration ==
The commune of Periam is administered by a mayor and a local council composed of 15 councilors. The mayor, Cornel Dumitraș, from the Social Democratic Party, has been in office since 2012. As from the 2024 local elections, the local council has the following composition by political parties:

Party	Seats	Composition
Social Democratic Party	9	
Alliance for the Union of Romanians	2	
Save Romania Union–People's Movement Party–Force of the Right	2	
National Liberal Party	1	
S.O.S. Romania	1	

== Notable people ==
- Karl Grünn (1855–1930), priest and poet
- Cornel Grofșorean (1881–1949), mayor of Timișoara (1921–1922, 1931–1932)
- Franz Heinz (b. 1929), writer
- Victor Gaga (1930–2003), sculptor
- Franz Remmel (1931–2019), ethnologist, journalist and writer
- Walter Andreas Kirchner (b. 1941), sculptor, painter and graphic artist
