= Iulian Grozescu =

Austro-Hungarian Romanian journalist and poet

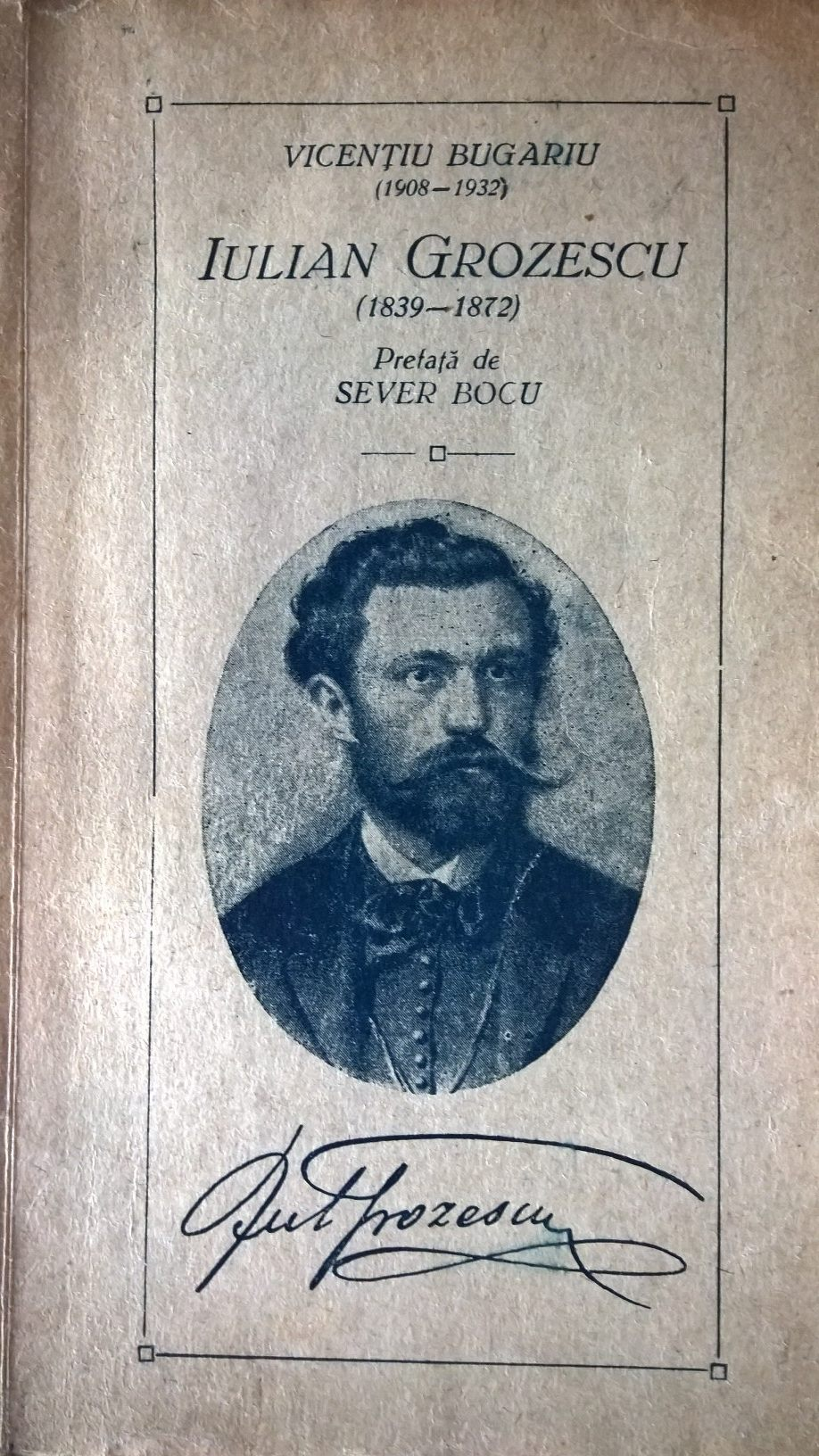
Portrait of Grozescu on a biography published in 1941

Iulian Grozescu (June 20, 1839–June 2 [O.S. May 21] 1872) was an Austro-Hungarian Romanian journalist and poet.

Born in Comloșu Mare, Torontál County, in the Banat region, he attended school in Timișoara, Arad and Oradea before studying law at the Royal University of Pest. He began his career in Romania in 1867, working for the Bucharest newspapers Poșta română, Telegraful and Concordia. He then returned to Pest in 1871, collaborating on the newspapers Albina and Umoristul (where he signed as Ghiță, Carabă and Eremie Ciocârlie) and editing the humorous journal Priculiciul in 1872. He published “Suveniri din București” in Familia. In Pest, together with Mircea V. Stănescu, he edited Speranța newspaper; a single edition appeared. Ill with tuberculosis for years, he died in his native village, aged 32. His poems, among which several fairly successful humorous ones, were published at Arad in 1873. Some of his verses, considered mediocre as poetry but bold politically, feature Romanian patriotic themes, anticipating the work of Octavian Goga. He also wrote several short stories on peasant subjects: “Fatalitate și noroc”, “Mărioară și Măriuța”, “Căderea Timișanei”, and published reviews.
