= Variaș =

- Commune
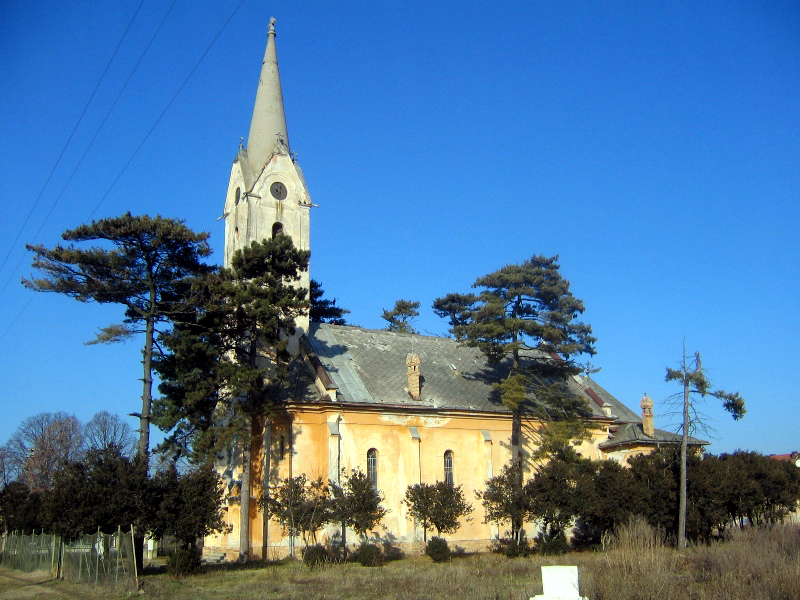
- The Roman Catholic church in Sânpetru Mic

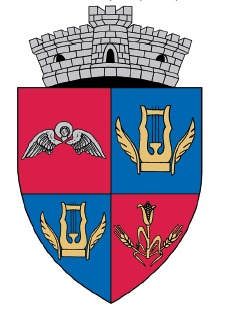
- Coat of arms

- Location in Timiș County

- Location in Romania
- Coordinates: 46°1′N 20°57′E
- Country: Romania
- County: Timiș

Government
  - Mayor (2020–): Nicolae Birău (PSD)
- Area: 103.69 km^{2} (40.03 sq mi)
- Population (2021-12-01): 5,293
  - Density: 51.05/km^{2} (132.2/sq mi)
- Time zone: UTC+02:00 (EET)
  - Summer (DST): UTC+03:00 (EEST)
- Postal code: 307455–307457
- Vehicle reg.: TM
- Website: primaria-varias.ro

Variaș (Hungarian: Varjas; German: Warjasch; Serbian: Варјаш, romanized: Varjaš) is a commune in Timiș County, Romania. It is composed of three villages: Gelu, Sânpetru Mic and Variaș (commune seat).

== Etymology ==
The name of the locality comes from varjú, which in Hungarian means "crow". The name Varjas is probably related to the heraldic element of a departed noble family.

After the repopulation of Variaș with German settlers, the Germanization of the name in Krähendorf was unsuccessfully attempted. The name Varias appears on Count Mercy's map of 1723 and is repeated on the maps of 1753, 1777 and 1783, respectively (in the form of Wariosch).

Immediately after the union of Banat with Romania in 1918, the commune bore the official name Dănciulești, a name that was given up on the occasion of the administrative-territorial reform of 1925.

== Geography ==
Variaș is located in the northwest of Timiș County, on the border with Arad County, about 41 km (25 mi) northwest of Timișoara. It borders Secusigiu (Arad County) to the north, Vinga (Arad County) to the northeast, Satchinez to the east and southeast, Biled to the southwest and Periam to the west and northwest. With a total area of 103.69 km^{2} (40.03 mi^{2}), Variaș commune covers 1.19% of the territory of Timiș County.

=== Relief ===
The territory of Variaș commune is part of the Banat Plain and is located on the first terrace of the Mureș River. The relief appears as a wide plain with small depressions and slight undulations without downhills exceeding 2–3°. The altitude varies between 94 and 98 m (308 and 322 ft).

=== Hydrography ===
The land belonging to Variaș commune is not crossed by running waters with permanent flow, but it has two narrow valleys that lead the water in the rainy years. One is in the east of Variaș, and the other in the west; both join in the south of the commune in a single canal that goes south and flows into the Ier Canal near Biled commune.

The village of Gelu is crossed by the Beghei stream, which divides it into two parts.

=== Climate ===
Variaș commune is located in a region where several climatic types intertwine: Mediterranean, temperate continental and oceanic. The average annual temperature ranges between −1 °C (30 °F) in winter and 21.9 °C (71.4 °F) in summer. Annual rainfall totals are between 500 and 600 mm (20 and 24 in). Precipitation occurs in late spring, in May and June, as well as in late autumn and early winter, in October, November and December.

=== Natural resources ===
The natural resources in the subsoil of Variaș commune include crude oil, natural gas and geothermal waters. The soil offers favorable conditions for agricultural crops (corn, wheat, barley, two-rowed barley, oat, sugar beet, sunflower, soybeans, etc.) and forage cultivation.

== History ==
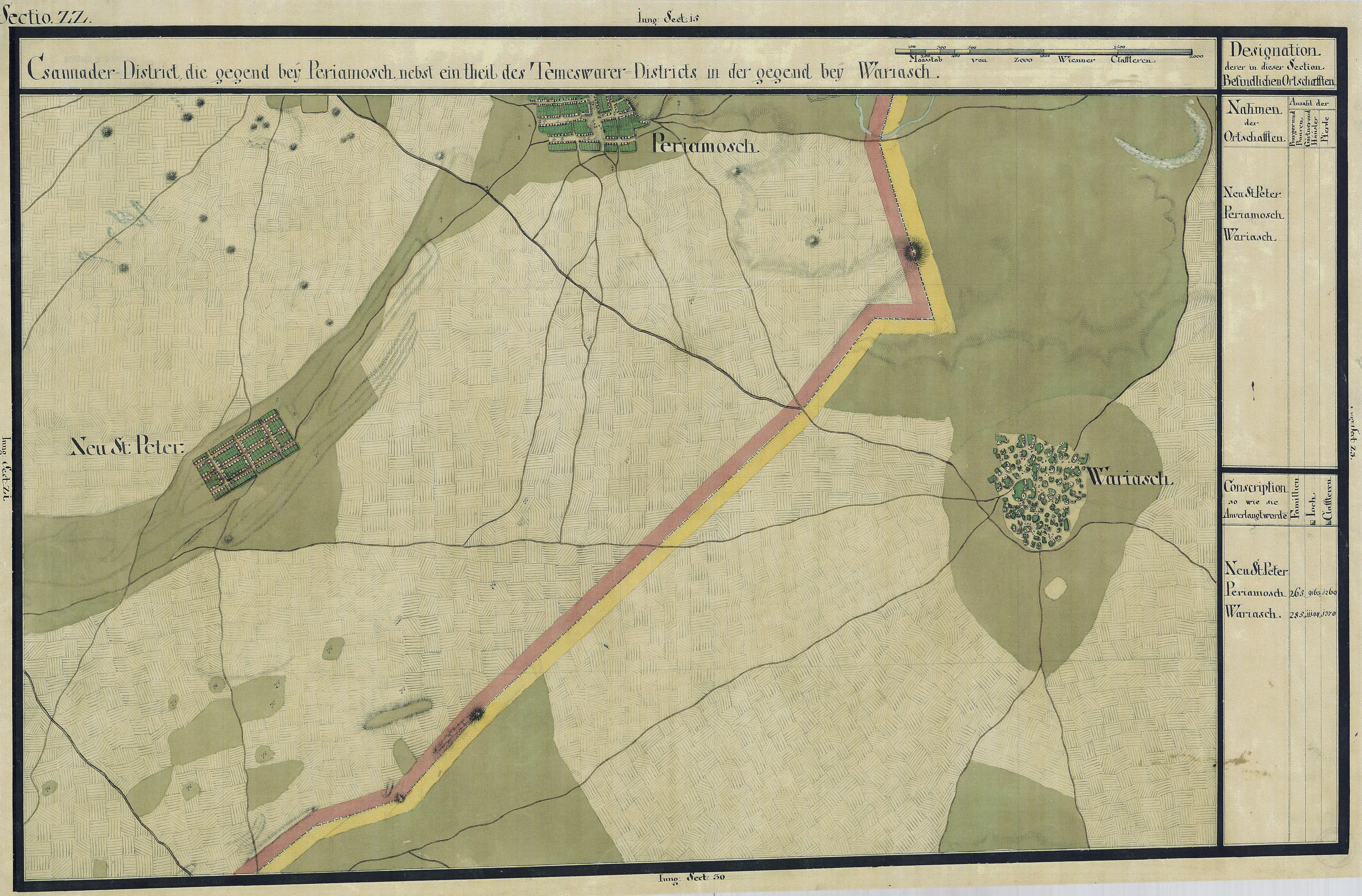
Variaș (Wariasch) on the Josephinische Landesaufnahme of 1769–1772

Variaș is first mentioned in a papal tithe document from 1333–1335 of the Catholic Diocese of Cenad, which states that Worias is a Hungarian village with a regulated Catholic parish. Variaș was a royal estate (of the Hungarian crown) until 1381, when it became the property of Petrus and Nicolaus Maczedoniay. Ioannes Maczedoniay donated Variaș in 1454 to his sister Anna, a widow of Fargacs. In 1464 Variaș is attested in the property of Felix Fargacs. In 1466 Variaș was bought for 500 guilders by the famous officer Ladislaus Dóczy, who stood out in the victory at Smederevo over the Ottoman Empire. Dóczy's residence was in Periam.

During the Ottoman rule between 1552–1716, most of the Hungarian inhabitants left Variaș, leaving only a few Vlach inhabitants. Later, the first Serb inhabitants will settle in the area. After the conquest of Banat by the Habsburg Empire, Variaș was populated by Serbian settlers who came as members of the Rural Militia and especially by German settlers. The latter settled starting with 1786 and came from other localities in Banat: Periam, Gottlob, Iecea Mare, etc. Until the completion of the land drainage works, the first generations of settlers faced poverty and epidemics, due to the swampy terrain and the unhealthy climate. In 1793 the existence of a Serbian school and a German school is attested. Variaș was inhabited mainly by three nationalities. Each nationality had its "own" street. Here there was a "Vlach street" (of the Romanians) and a "Serbian street". The German one was called the "central street".

During the interwar period, Variaș was part of Plasa Periam, Timiș-Torontal County. In the immediate aftermath of World War II, many residents were dispossessed of their property by the Expropriation Act and deported to both USSR and Bărăgan (June 1951). The deportees carried out forced labor until January 1956. Moldavian families were installed in the houses left vacant in Variaș. The return of the deportees to Variaș led to conflicts with Moldavian families settled in the locality, conflicts that lasted until the 1960s, when the blocks of flats were built on the site of the former headquarters of German volunteer firefighters in Variaș, simultaneously with the decision of the first German families to emigrate to the Federal Republic of Germany.

== Demographics ==
Ethnic composition (2021)
1. Romanians (67.7%)
2. Serbs (6.44%)
3. Hungarians (5.89%)
4. Roma (4.40%)
5. Ukrainians (1.90%)
6. Unknown (12.7%)
7. Others (0.94%)
Religious composition (2021)
1. Orthodox (64.0%)
2. Serbian Orthodox (8.44%)
3. Roman Catholics (7.55%)
4. Pentecostals (4.42%)
5. Baptists (1.09%)
6. Unknown (13.4%)
7. Others (0.90%)
8. Irreligious, atheists and agnostics (0.28%)

Variaș had a population of 5,293 inhabitants at the 2021 census, down 6.84% from the 2011 census. Most inhabitants are Romanians (67.74%), larger minorities being represented by Serbs (6.44%), Hungarians (5.89%), Roma (4.4%) and Ukrainians (1.9%). For 12.69% of the population, ethnicity is unknown. By religion, most inhabitants are Orthodox (63.95%), but there are also minorities of Serbian Orthodox (8.44%), Roman Catholics (7.55%), Pentecostals (4.42%) and Baptists (1.09%). For 13.37% of the population, religious affiliation is unknown.

Census		Ethnic composition
Year	Population	Romanians	Hungarians	Germans	Roma	Ukrainians	Serbs	Slovaks
1880	7,479	116	45	3,849	–	30	3,279	86
1890	8,002	204	94	4,325	–	3	3,218	85
1900	7,891	98	168	4,228	–	4	3,338	42
1910	6,968	109	167	3,538	–	–	3,097	49
1920	6,865	39	66	3,504	–	–	–	–
1930	6,687	191	111	3,540	103	1	2,689	32
1941	7,063	525	214	3,655	–	–	–	–
1956	7,094	1,577	295	2,621	5	164	2,383	29
1966	6,800	1,669	326	2,399	99	229	2,024	19
1977	6,660	2,572	374	1,742	97	269	1,548	12
1992	6,059	3,630	668	150	171	290	1,130	8
2002	6,117	4,128	583	55	274	263	789	10
2011	5,682	3,906	475	38	219	177	546	4
2021	5,293	3,586	312	36	233	101	341	–

== Politics and administration ==
The commune of Variaș is administered by a mayor and a local council composed of 15 councilors. The mayor, Nicolae Birău, from the Social Democratic Party, has been in office since 2020. As from the 2024 local elections, the local council has the following composition by political parties:

Party	Seats	Composition
Social Democratic Party	9	
National Liberal Party	4	
Alliance for the Union of Romanians	2	

== Economy ==
The economy of the Variaș commune is primarily based on cereal cultivation, technical crops, and vegetable farming, complemented by animal breeding and productive activities in the processing of animal-derived agricultural products, alongside the development of individual farms, industry, trade, and services.

== Notable people ==
- Karl Huber (1828–1885), composer, violinist and conductor
- Nikolaus Engelmann (1908–2005), actor, writer and journalist
- Hans Kehrer (1913–2009), actor, poet and playwright
- Hans Bohn (b. 1927), journalist
- Sava Ilin (1935–1989), folklorist, composer and conductor
- Dușan Petrovici (1938–2023), poet and translator
- Michael Pepa (b. 1939), composer, violinist and professor
- Vlada Barzin (1940–2006), poet and accountant
- Ivo Muncian (b. 1943), poet, prose writer and translator
- Vasile Șirli (b. 1948), composer and music producer
- Ljubomir Stepanov (1952–2015), economist
- Ciobotin Blagoiev (b. 1963), priest, poet and professor
- Srdjan Luchin (b. 1986), footballer
