= Lenauheim =

- Commune
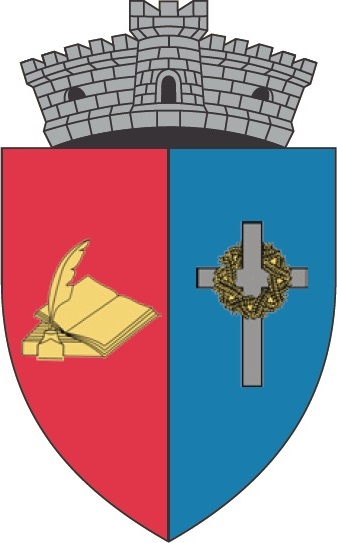
- Coat of arms

- Location in Timiș County

- Location in Romania
- Coordinates: 45°52′N 20°48′E
- Country: Romania
- County: Timiș

Government
  - Mayor (2008–): Ilie Suciu (PNL)
- Area: 112.74 km^{2} (43.53 sq mi)
- Population (2021-12-01): 5,349
  - Density: 47.45/km^{2} (122.9/sq mi)
- Time zone: UTC+02:00 (EET)
  - Summer (DST): UTC+03:00 (EEST)
- Postal code: 307240–307242
- Vehicle reg.: TM
- Website: www.lenauheim.ro

Lenauheim (until 1926 Cetad; German: Lenauheim, formerly Tschatad; Hungarian: Csatád; Serbian: Ленаухајм, romanized: Lenauhajm) is a commune in Timiș County, Romania. It is composed of three villages: Bulgăruș, Grabaț and Lenauheim (commune seat). Lenauheim was named after the poet Nikolaus Lenau, born here in 1802.

== Geography ==
Lenauheim is located in the western part of Timiș County, 45 km (28 mi) from Timișoara and 14 km (8.7 mi) from Jimbolia, the nearest town. It borders Lovrin and Sânpetru Mare to the north, Biled and Cărpiniș to the east, Jimbolia to the south and Comloșu Mare to the west.

=== Relief ===
Lenauheim lies within a wide plain, slightly inclined to the southwest and south, with an average altitude of 85–90 m. The whole relief is characterised by the predominance of smooth surfaces typical of the extremities of the Pannonian Plain.

=== Climate ===
Lenauheim's climate is classified as warm and temperate and is strongly influenced by the Mediterranean climate, especially the Adriatic one. Winters are relatively mild and often snow-free, springs are short and with sudden shifts from cold to warm seasons, and summers are quite hot and sometimes with heavy rainfall. Autumn is generally marked by good weather, although sometimes, towards the end of this season, there are frosts and snow damaging the crops. The average annual temperature is 10.8 °C (51.4 °F), with a variation between 9.2 and 12.6 °C (48.6 and 54.7 °F). The coldest month is January (−2.5 °C or 27.5 °F), while the warmest month is July (22.2 °C or 72.0 °F). The average rainfall is 570 mm (22 in) per year, with a variation between 321.4 and 749.9 mm (12.65 and 29.52 in). During drier years, the area acquires a more pronounced character of steppe, and during the rainier years, of forest-steppe. Most precipitation falls in May – 76.2 mm (3 in), then in June – 60.6 mm (2.39 in). Rainy winds blow from the west and southwest. Sometimes, in the summer, they bring storms and hail. The strength of the winds varies between 2.3–3 m/s (8.3–10.8 km/h; 5.1–6.7 mph), but in some cases they turn into real hurricanes. In particular, spring winds sometimes cause serious damage to vegetable crops by destroying nurseries, solariums and greenhouses.

=== Hydrography ===
Located in a steppe area, Lenauheim is deficient in running waters. The hydrographic network is poorly represented, the running waters with constant and permanent flow being absent. However, this situation is supplemented by a network of canals oriented towards Bega (the drainage ones) and towards Mureș (the supply ones), a network that was executed within some hydro-improvement works with the participation of the locals between 1957 and 1960.

=== Flora ===
The vegetation is rich due to favourable climate and soil conditions. The rich humus of the soil makes the grassy vegetation to be widespread, and the weeds to grow vigorously. The plants found in this area are part of different categories of floristic elements, predominating the Central European one with strong Mediterranean influences. Around 1880, in the northwestern part of Lenauheim, there was an oak forest that stretched over several tens of hectares and belonged to the Aerarium. The Aerarium sold it and it was completely cleared, being turned into arable land. The spread of the conifers is limited. However, there are specimens of Picea abies (spruce), Abies alba (silver fir), Abies concolor (white fir), Pseudotsuga menziesii (Douglas-fir), different species of pine (Pinus strobus, P. nigra and P. sylvestris), and in the Lenauheim school park small specimens of Larix decidua (European larch), Taxus baccata (yew) and Juniperus communis (juniper). Although it is not a fruit-growing region, there are still many species of fruit trees, including apple, pear, quince, cherry plum, apricot, plum, peach, walnut, sour cherry, cherry, and among the Mediterranean species, fig and almond. The arboretum is most widespread along the railways, on the edge of roads and ponds and to a lesser extent in people's gardens. Corylus avellana (hazel), Sambucus nigra (black elderberry), Rosa canina (dog rose), Prunus spinosa (blackthorn), Salix purpurea (purple willow), Humulus lupulus (hop), Syringa vulgaris (lilac), Berberis vulgaris (barberry) and numerous other shrub and semi-shrub species grow here. Water plants are less widespread due to the lack of running waters and larger swampy areas. There are, however, small areas covered with a fairly rich aquatic vegetation consisting of reeds and rushes, bulrushes, sedges, and in the waters of the ponds duckweeds and water silk.

=== Fauna ===
The intensive development of agriculture, the cutting of the oak forest near Lenauheim, and more recently of the edges of black locust and the clumps of weeping willows and poplars led to the limitation of the animal species that populate this region. Bustards, little bustards and black storks have disappeared, while grouse and red-breasted geese are birds of passage. During milder winters there are some species of birds that are not commonly found in the area and in its surroundings: little and great bittern, glossy ibis, northern lapwing, water rail, green and black woodpecker, etc. Mammals found here include deer, fox, hare, hamster, suslik, field mouse, some of which are harmful to agricultural crops. Reptiles are represented by viviparous lizard and green lizard, and batrachians by marsh frog, green toad and tree frog. Insects are quite numerous: bees, wasps, mole crickets, locusts, crickets, ants, ladybugs, beetles, caterpillar hunters, Colorado beetles, etc., as well as numerous butterflies. Fish are missing apart from some common species characteristic of stagnant waters.

== History ==
=== Lenauheim ===
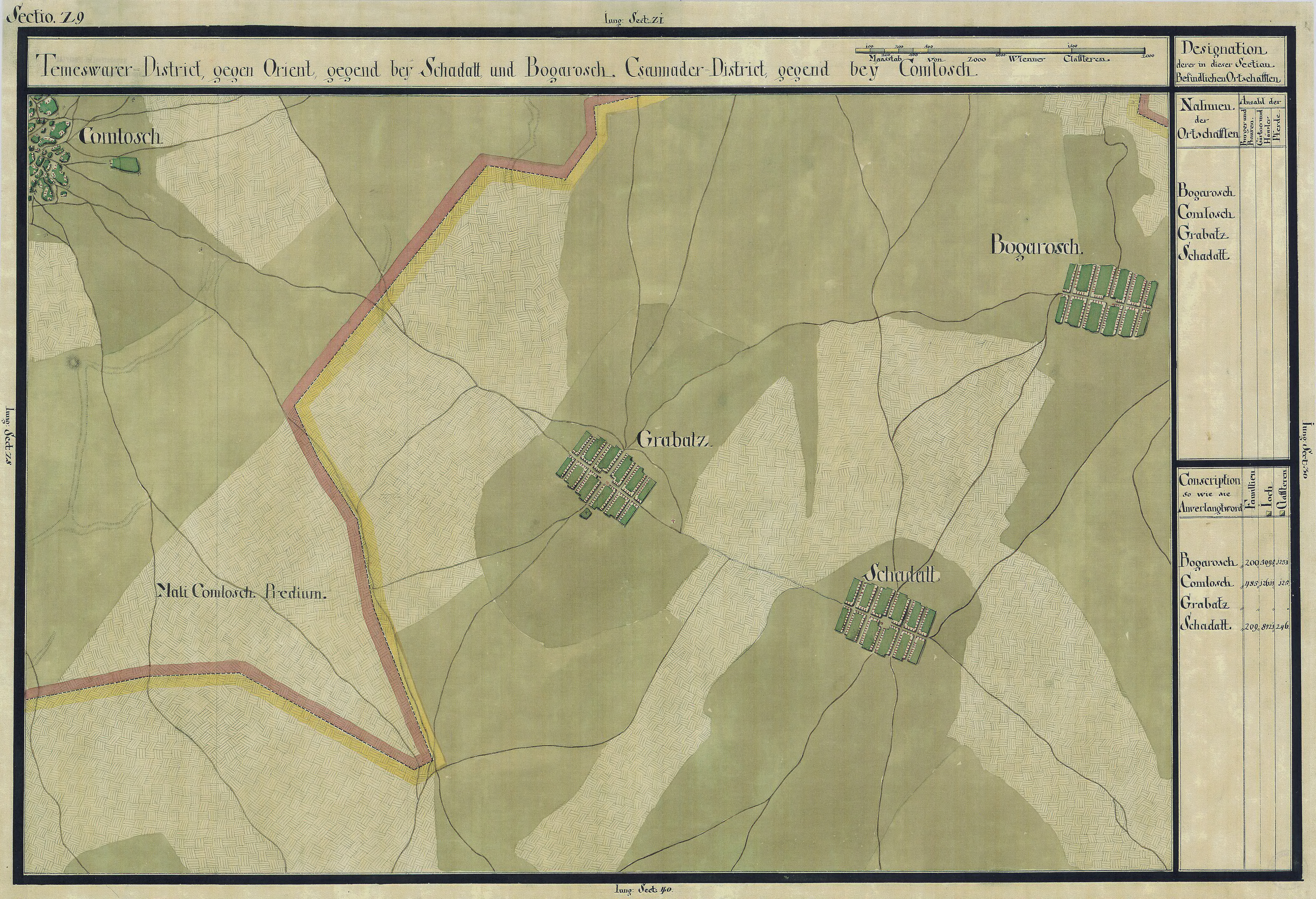
Lenauheim (Schadatt), Bulgăruș (Bogarosch) and Grabaț (Grabatz) in the Josephinian Land Survey of 1769–1772

The first evidence of the existence of a community in present-day Lenauheim is from the 3rd–4th centuries. Archaeological studies from 1960 have brought to light vessels made in the post-Roman period. These vessels are exhibited at the National Museum of Banat in Timișoara.

Between 1311 and 1415 are recorded the presence of several landlords, including Mathias von Csatád from which comes the old name of the village – Cetad. Historian Ágoston Bárány suggests that the name derives from the Romanian word cetate ("citadel"), invoking the existence around 1845 of some old foundations identified within the commune's borders. Although unlikely, other historians derive the word csata (Hungarian for "battle") from that name. On 12 May 1470, King Matthias Corvinus donated Cetad to the Dóczy family, one of the most influential families in southern Hungary. They settled only in 1477 and resided here until 1481 when, following the dismissal of the head of the family from the rulership of Banat by Matthias Corvinus, Cetad became the property of the Révay family. However, Cetad came into the possession of the Dóczys once again in 1482. By that time, Cetad was ravaged by Ottoman incursions; a document of 23 March 1482 mentions it as a puszta (Hungarian for "deserted"). Little is known about the fortress at Cetad during the Ottoman occupation of Banat; most likely it was destroyed. From the center of the commune radiate some underground tunnels, built in the form of a vault, which have been little researched. It is assumed that these underground tunnels built of brick with hot lime mortar were specific to some reinforcements from the Banat Plain and were ways of retreat in case of danger.

Today's Lenauheim was established in 1767 by colonisation with Germans from Luxembourg, Lorraine, Trier, Westphalia and Bavaria. 202 houses were built at the behest of Councilor Johann Wilhelm Edler von Hildebrand, and the colony thus established was given the Hungarianized name Csatád, thus recovering the name of the old medieval settlement.

In 1925, with the Law for Administrative Unification, the name of the commune changed from Cetad to Lenauheim, after the German-language poet Nikolaus Lenau, born here in 1802. The majority German population began to shrink after World War II. In 1945, 141 locals were deported to the USSR. Also during this period a large number of ethnic Germans were deported to Bărăgan. By Law no. 2/1968 regarding the administrative-territorial reorganisation of Romania in Lenauheim commune are included the neighboring localities Bulgăruș and Grabaț, until that law independent communes, the center of the new commune being Lenauheim.

=== Bulgăruș ===
Bulgăruș is first attested by Hungarian documents dating from 1452 and 1493. It was then called Bogaros. During the Ottoman occupation of Banat, it seems that it was completely deserted and disappeared towards the end of the 16th century. However, the name Bogaros appears in several Turkish defters, referring to the praedium of the same name. At the 1717 census it is registered as uninhabited. The old hearth of the village was identified about 100 m from the current village.

The village was re-established in 1769 by German colonisation, according to the plan of the commander of Timisoara Neumann. The first German (Swabian) colonists began to settle in Bulgăruș in early 1769 and came from Lotharingia, Luxembourg, Upper Austria and Hesse. Each received a plot for house, 34 jugers of land, construction materials and was granted various privileges and tax exemptions. The Germans kept the old name, adapted to their language – Bogarosch. The plague epidemic of 1831–1836 killed a large number of inhabitants. In 1836 alone, 107 people died of plague within three months, while another 700 were ill.

The Hungarian Revolution of 1848 had a major impact on village life. Many of the inhabitants were directly involved in the events and many died in the fighting that took place in the area. In 1849 Bulgăruș was practically besieged by an army of 20,000 soldiers and 84 cannons, as well as the battleground between the revolutionaries and the imperial armies. Heavy fighting took place on 8 August 1849 between Bulgăruș and Cetad (present-day Lenauheim), resulting in numerous deaths and injuries among the villagers. The political activity of the Swabians from more than 38 German villages in Banat materialized in the Petition of the Swabians from Bulgăruș on 2 October 1849, which demanded more liberties for the Swabians in Banat.

During the Bărăgan deportations, Bulgăruș was one of the most affected in the whole of Banat, no less than 559 people being deported (about a quarter of the total population). The exodus of the Germans to Germany took place during the communist period and after 1990. Germans were replaced by Romanians coming from different parts of the country.

=== Grabaț ===
The name Grabaț is of Slavic origin and already existed when the first Swabians arrived here, but it did not describe a specific settlement, but rather an area sporadically inhabited by Serbian cattle breeders. Count Mercy's map of 1723 shows a praedium (estate) called Grabatz, although the village did not exist at that time.

Grabaț was founded in 1764, during the second wave of colonisation of Banat, also called the "Theresian Colonisation" (German: Theresianische Ansiedlung). Within this colonisation program, the imperial administration of Banat ordered the creation in the Grabatz estate of a new settlement for German (Swabian) colonists. Johann Wilhelm Edler von Hildebrand, the administrative adviser to the Imperial Court in Vienna, was responsible for the establishment of the colony. He first ordered the design of the settlement according to a predetermined model, with the church, the parish house, the school, the town hall and the pub being in the central point of the village, with parallel streets and equal plots for houses. A year later, in 1765, about 40 families of German colonists settled here. Most came from southwestern Germany (Alsace, Lorraine, Rhineland-Palatinate, Württemberg, Schwarzwald and Luxembourg), then Germans from Săcălaz and nearby German villages. In 1769 the settlement already had 200 houses and a Roman Catholic church, built of wood. The brick church was completed only in 1780.

== Demographics ==
Ethnic composition (2021)
1. Romanians (77.2%)
2. Roma (10.8%)
3. Germans (1.32%)
4. Unknown (9.92%)
5. Others (0.85%)
Religious composition (2021)
1. Orthodox (71.0%)
2. Roman Catholics (11.1%)
3. Pentecostals (5.72%)
4. Unknown (10.4%)
5. Others (1.59%)
6. Irreligious, atheists and agnostics (0.18%)

Lenauheim had a population of 5,349 inhabitants at the 2021 census, up 4.7% from the 2011 census. Most inhabitants are Romanians (77.15%), larger minorities being represented by Roma (10.76%) and Germans (1.32%). For 9.92% of the population, ethnicity is unknown. By religion, most inhabitants are Orthodox (71%), but there are also minorities of Roman Catholics (11.14%) and Pentecostals (5.72%). For 10.37% of the population, religious affiliation is unknown.

Census		Ethnic composition
Year	Population	Romanians	Hungarians	Germans	Roma
1880	8,780	46	58	8,487	–
1890	8,840	93	75	8,470	–
1900	8,104	62	94	7,727	–
1910	7,449	108	196	6,899	–
1920	7,497	116	134	7,109	–
1930	7,170	114	77	6,653	253
1941	7,402	309	147	6,482	–
1956	7,876	3,190	118	4,193	327
1966	8,195	3,513	85	4,253	304
1977	7,490	3,478	77	3,509	402
1992	5,123	3,943	66	346	734
2002	5,676	4,617	99	193	727
2011	5,109	3,988	62	96	555
2021	5,349	4,127	37	71	576

== Politics and administration ==
The commune of Lenauheim is administered by a mayor and a local council composed of 15 councilors. The mayor, Ilie Suciu, from the National Liberal Party, has been in office since 2008. As from the 2024 local elections, the local council has the following composition by political parties:

Party	Seats	Composition
National Liberal Party	7	
Save Romania Union–People's Movement Party–Force of the Right	4	
Social Democratic Party	2	
Alliance for the Union of Romanians	2	

== Twin towns ==
- (Austria) Mureck

== Notable people ==
- Nikolaus Lenau (1802–1850), poet
- Hans Wolfram Hockl (1912–1998), writer
