= Pesac =

- Commune
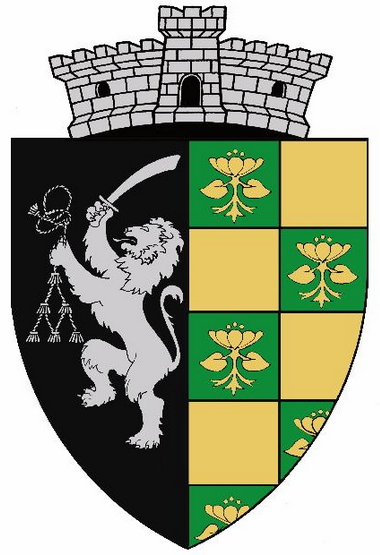
- Coat of arms

- Location in Timiș County

- Location in Romania
- Coordinates: 46°0′N 20°50′E
- Country: Romania
- County: Timiș

Government
  - Mayor (2008–): Cornel Toma (PSD)
- Area: 34.16 km^{2} (13.19 sq mi)
- Population (2021-12-01): 1,835
  - Density: 53.72/km^{2} (139.1/sq mi)
- Time zone: UTC+02:00 (EET)
  - Summer (DST): UTC+03:00 (EEST)
- Postal code: 307316
- Vehicle reg.: TM
- Website: www.primariapesac.ro

Pesac (Hungarian: Pészak; German: Pesak; Serbian: Песак, romanized: Pesak) is a commune in Timiș County, Romania. Part of Periam commune until 2007, it is composed of a single village, Pesac.

== History ==
The first recorded mention of Pesac dates from 1399, when it is mentioned in a Hungarian diploma as Puerseegh. In 1426 it is attested with the name Pwrsegh, and in 1549 Persek. After this period it does not appear mentioned anywhere.

The present-day settlement was re-established in 1768, by settling here the inhabitants of the neighboring village Sânpetru Sârbesc (present-day Sânpetru Mare) due to frequent floods and the land being unfavorable for agriculture. The first inhabitants were the Romanians from Sânpetru who settled on the estate of Iosif Bayzath. He offered them land to build their houses. The new locality was named Pesak.

Historian Ioan Lotreanu claims that the first inhabitants were the Romanians from Sânpetru who left there because they did not get along with the Serbs. After the establishment of the locality, the documents speak of Pesak as a Serbian locality. It had a Serbian name, and the Slavonic language was used in the church. However, in 1774, six years after its establishment, Pesac already appears in the documents of the land book of the Cenad constituency, on which it depended as walachisches ort ("Vlach village"). It is therefore impossible that the village was Romanianized in such a short time, as it was Romanian from the very beginning.

From 1778 Banat was incorporated into Hungary, so that from 1779, Pesac commune was part of Torontál County. In 1799 Bayzath colonized 62 families of Romanian serfs from the parts of Sibiu, further strengthening the Romanian element. Later, Bayzath's brother colonized Germans from neighboring villages at Pesac. They held a significant share of the population until after World War II, when their numbers began to decline sharply.

== Demographics ==
Ethnic composition (2021)
1. Romanians (72.6%)
2. Roma (7.24%)
3. Unknown (19.5%)
4. Others (0.62%)
Religious composition (2021)
1. Orthodox (63.2%)
2. Pentecostals (12.5%)
3. Roman Catholics (2.07%)
4. Baptists (1.36%)
5. Unknown (19.7%)
6. Others (0.84%)
7. Irreligious, atheists and agnostics (0.32%)

Pesac had a population of 1,835 inhabitants at the 2021 census, down 7.79% from the 2011 census. Most inhabitants are Romanians (72.64%), with a minority of Roma (7.24%). For 19.5% of the population, ethnicity is unknown. By religion, most inhabitants are Orthodox (63.16%), but there are also minorities of Pentecostals (12.53%), Roman Catholics (2.07%) and Baptists (1.36%). For 19.72% of the population, religious affiliation is unknown.

Census		Ethnic composition
Year	Population	Romanians	Hungarians	Germans	Roma
1880	2,953	2,202	13	627	–
1890	3,139	2,369	25	667	169
1900	3,098	2,454	38	598	–
1910	2,986	2,223	97	479	178
1920	2,952	2,424	60	452	–
1930	2,721	2,018	51	458	177
1941	2,519	1,955	28	402	–
1956	2,304	–	–	–	–
1966	2,231	2,063	1	158	–
1977	2,213	1,999	10	123	55
1992	1,983	1,511	16	35	406
2002	2,162	1,887	12	13	242
2011	1,990	1,768	7	–	112
2021	1,835	1,333	–	4	133

== Politics and administration ==
The commune of Pesac is administered by a mayor and a local council composed of 11 councilors. The mayor, Cornel Toma, from the Social Democratic Party, has been in office since 2008. As from the 2024 local elections, the local council has the following composition by political parties:

Party	Seats	Composition
Social Democratic Party	6	
Alliance for the Union of Romanians	3	
National Liberal Party	2	
