= Vasile Șirli =

Romanian musical composer and producer

- Born: 25 September 1948 (age 77); Variaș, Timiș County, Romania
- Genres: Easy listening, film score, incidental and classical music
- Occupation(s): Musical composer and producer
- Instrument: Piano

Vasile Șirli (born 25 September 1948) is a Romanian musical composer and producer. A pianist, Șirli specialises in easy listening, film, incidental and classical music. He studied at the National University of Music Bucharest, was an editor at Editura Muzicală and became director at Electrecord and at Disneyland Paris. Șirli is a Megleno-Romanian.

== Biography ==
Vasile Șirli was born on 25 September 1948 in Variaș, Romania. He was born in a Megleno-Romanian family originating from villages in the north of Greece who migrated to Romania in the 1920s. They settled in Southern Dobruja, but moved to Northern Dobruja following the former's cession to Bulgaria; in 1946 and 1947, following World War II, some Megleno-Romanian families in Northern Dobruja, including Șirli's, were deported to Banat, possibly to balance the German, Hungarian and Serb populations of the region.

He was musically inclined from an early age, during which he took piano lessons. He would later be admitted to the Music and Plastic Arts Lyceum of Timișoara in piano class, accessing the National University of Music Bucharest in Bucharest in 1967. In 1972, Șirli became editor at Editura Muzicală, and from 1980 to 1984, he was artistic director at the Romanian record label Electrecord, the only in Romania at the time.

In 1978, after composing music for a poem by poet and playwright Marin Sorescu for the 60th anniversary of the Great Union, journalist Tudor Vornicu asked him to compose music for a short film by Constantin Chelba, and as a result, he was recommended to theater director Dan Micu, starting his debut as an incidental music composer. Furthermore, Șirli debuted as a film score composer for the 1982 film A crew for Singapore (Romanian: Un echipaj pentru Singapore) by director Nicu Stan. Șirli also specialises in easy listening music and classical music.

In 1986, Șirli migrated to Paris, in France, where he currently lives. In 1990, he became director of the musical department of Disneyland Paris. He has recurrently returned to Romania to perform various shows ever since. Vasile Șirli is married to musicologist Adriana, with whom he has a daughter, Ruxandra, a violinist.
