= Johann Gottlieb Lehmann =

Johann Gottlieb Lehmann (1782–1837) was an expert in classical studies and noted director of the Gymnasium at Luckau, Germany (1836–41).
