= Gottlob =

Gottlob is a family name, which may refer to:

- Georg Gottlob, Austrian computer scientist

Gottlob is a given name, which may refer to:

- Gottlob Berger (1896–1975), senior German Nazi official
- Gottlob Burmann (1737–1805), German Romantic poet and lipogrammatist
- Gottlob Frege (1848–1925), German philosopher, logician and mathematician
- Gottlob Frick (1906–1994), German operatic bass
- Gottlob E. Weiss (1820–1900), American politician

Gottlob as a middle name may refer to:

- Christian August Gottlob Eberhard (1769–1845), German writer
- Christian Gottlob Heine (1729–1812), German classical scholar and archaeologist
- Johann Gottlob Lehmann (disambiguation)
  - Johann Gottlob Lehmann (classicist) (1782–1837) German expert in classical studies and noted director of the Gymnasium at Luckau, Germany
  - Johann Gottlob Lehmann (1719–1767) German mineralogist and geologist
- Johann Gottlob Leidenfrost (1715–1794), German doctor and theologian who first described the scientific phenomenon eponymously named the Leidenfrost effect
- Adam Gottlob Moltke (1710–1792), Danish courtier, statesman and diplomat
- Christoph Gottlob Müller (1785–1858), Considered to be the founder of the Wesleyan Church in Germany
- Christian Gottlob Neefe (1748–1798), German opera composer and conductor
- Adam Gottlob Oehlenschläger (1779–1850), Danish poet and playwright
- Johann Gottlob Theaenus Schneider (1750–1822), German classicist and naturalist
- Eugen Gottlob Winkler (1912–1936), German writer and essayist
- Karl Gottlob Zumpt (1792–1849), German classical scholar known for his work in the field of Latin philology

Gottlob may also refer to the following places:

- Gottlob, a commune in the Timiș County, Romania

== See also ==
- Gottlober
- Gottlieb
