= Eugen Gottlob Winkler =

German writer and essayist

Eugen Gottlob Winkler (1912, in Zürich – 1936, in Munich) was a German writer and essayist. He grew up in Stuttgart and studied Germanistics, Romantic philology and art history at Munich, Paris, Tübingen and Cologne.

Eugen Gottlob Winkler wrote criticism and essays in order to earn a basic livelihood and devote himself to literary pursuits without a conventional job. Although he was in jail for several days in 1933, being accused of damaging a Nazi Party placard, he continued to write for numerous newspapers including Das Deutsche Wort, the Deutsche Zeitschrift, Bücherwurm and the Deutsche Rundschau. In 1936, he committed suicide in Munich under still unclear circumstances.
