= Biled =

- Commune
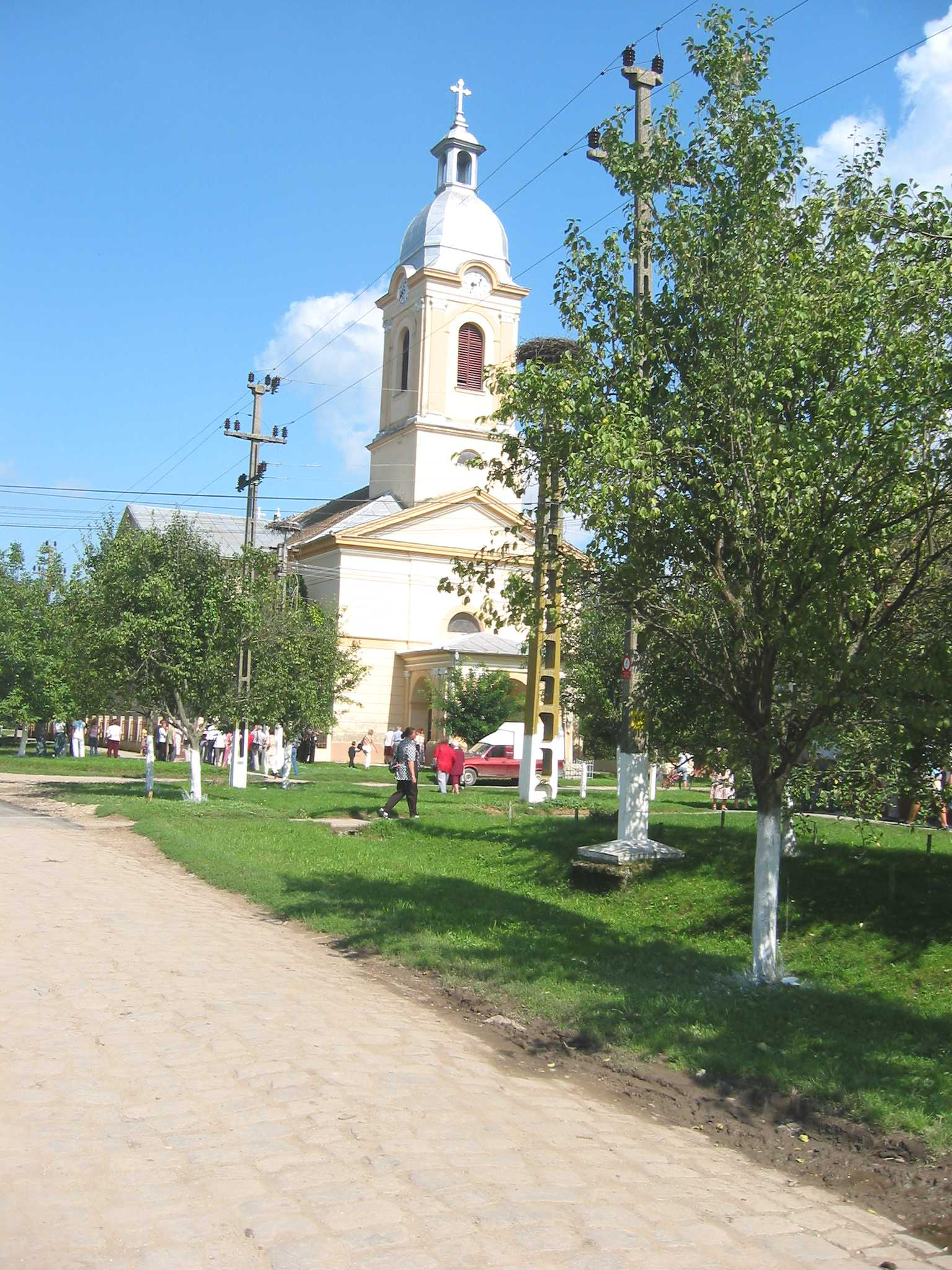
- Roman Catholic church in Biled

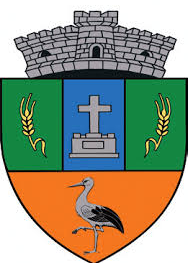
- Coat of arms

- Location in Timiș County

- Location in Romania
- Coordinates: 45°53′N 20°58′E
- Country: Romania
- County: Timiș

Government
  - Mayor (2020–): Ovidiu-Ioan Oprișa (PNL)
- Area: 55.11 km^{2} (21.28 sq mi)
- Population (2021-12-01): 3,031
  - Density: 55.00/km^{2} (142.4/sq mi)
- Time zone: UTC+02:00 (EET)
  - Summer (DST): UTC+03:00 (EEST)
- Postal code: 307060
- Vehicle reg.: TM
- Website: primaria-biled.ro

Biled (Hungarian: Billéd; German: Billed; Serbian: Биљед, romanized: Biljed) is a commune in Timiș County, Romania. It is composed of a single village, Biled. It also included two other villages until 2004, when they were split off to form the commune of Șandra.

== Geography ==
Biled is located in the Banat Plain, in the western part of Timiș County, 27 km (17 mi) northwest of Timișoara on DN6.

=== Climate ===
Like most of Timiș County, the climate is continental. The climate gets Mediterranean influences from the south. It has a temperate character (the annual mean temperature being 10.5 °C or 50.9 °F), with hot summers, not-too-cold winters, quite early springs and sometimes very long autumns. The average annual rainfall is 520 mm (20 in), with variations from 350 to 730 mm (14 to 29 in). Most precipitation falls during spring–summer in May–August, with torrential rains accompanied by hail. The dominant wind is the austru, a dry wind from the south, which blows almost all year round.

=== Flora and fauna ===
The dominant vegetation is grassy. Trees are mainly represented by black locusts, mulberries and poplars, and shrubs by blackthorn and hawthorn. The most common weeds, many of them harmful to agricultural crops, are thistles, blackberries, cornflowers, poppies, oraches, and lately sorghum has spread.

Regarding the fauna, this area is suitable for hares, sousliks, hamsters, steppe polecats, and among the bird species can be mentioned the quail, the partridge, the skylark, the pheasant and the starling.

== History ==
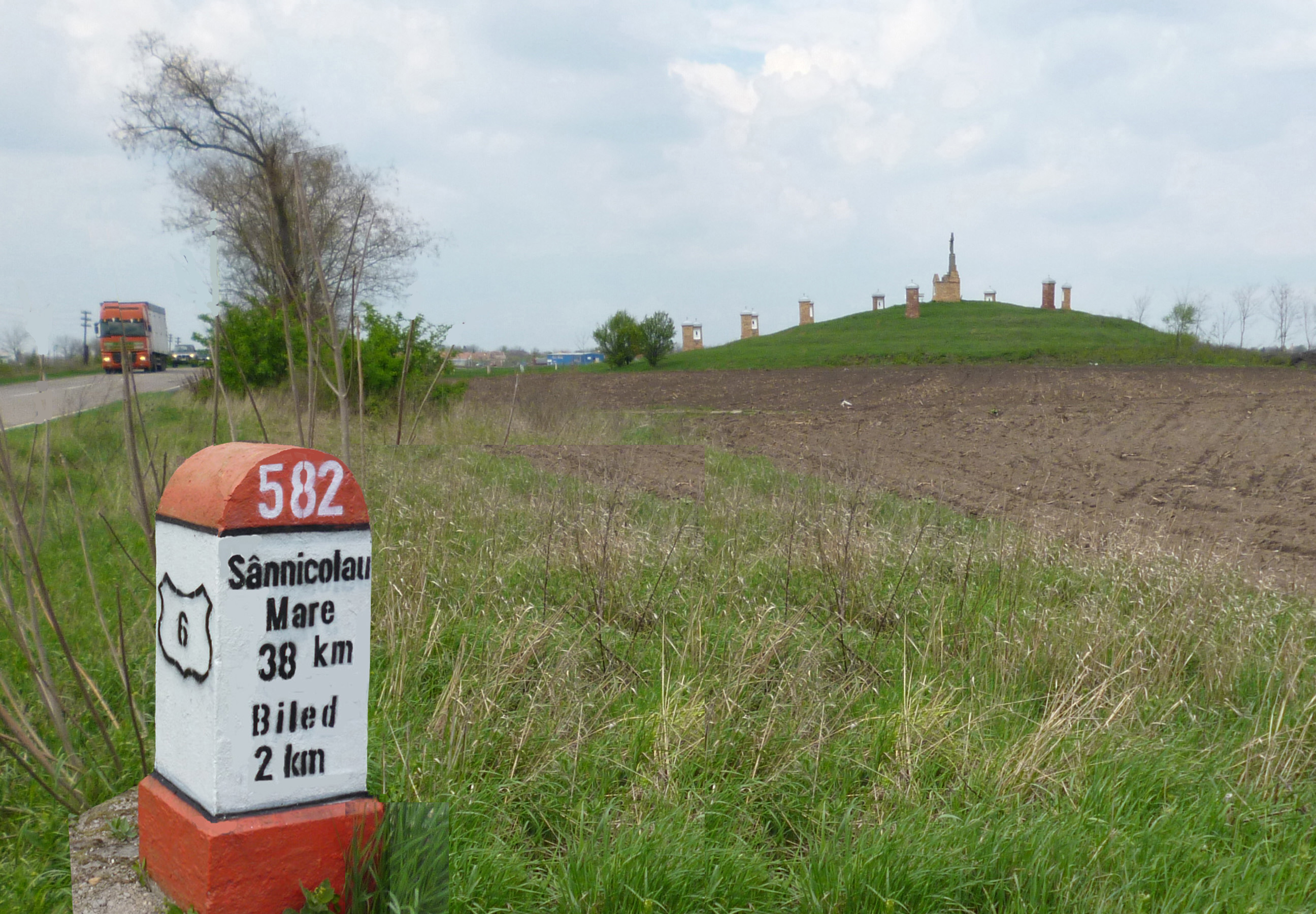
The Calvary Monument (German: Kalvarienberg), erected in 1837, is a landmark of Biled and a replica of Jesus' path to Golgotha.

Biled was first documented in 1462 (Bylyed) as belonging to nobleman Nicolae of Beregsău, but it is probably older. A treasure consisting of about 2,000 coins of bronze, silver and gold issued from Trajan to Constantine the Great was discovered in 1847. The treasure is preserved in the Numismatic Cabinet of the Kunsthistorisches Museum in Vienna. Also here were found the vestiges of several Daco-Roman settlements dating from the 3rd–4th centuries.

In 1562 Biled became royal property, being donated by King Ferdinand I to chatelaine László Kerecsényi. Biled received the status of urban settlement in 1609, allowing it to host monthly and annual fairs. It became deserted during the Ottoman occupation. Towards the end of the 17th century, a Serbian population under the guidance of Patriarch Arsenie Csernovici settled in Biled. The German colonization took place in a first stage in 1765 and in a second stage between 1768 and 1775. By 1786 Biled had the status of urban settlement. The church was built in the same year.

== Demographics ==
Ethnic composition (2021)
1. Romanians (81.3%)
2. Hungarians (2.63%)
3. Roma (2.21%)
4. Germans (1.28%)
5. Unknown (12.0%)
6. Others (0.59%)
Religious composition (2021)
1. Orthodox (73.1%)
2. Roman Catholics (7.42%)
3. Pentecostals (3.95%)
4. Unknown (12.6%)
5. Others (2.79%)
6. Irreligious, atheists and agnostics (0.13%)

Biled had a population of 3,031 inhabitants at the 2021 census, down 7.99% from the 2011 census. Most inhabitants are Romanians (81.32%), larger minorities being represented by Hungarians (2.63%), Roma (2.21%) and Germans (1.28%). For 11.97% of the population, ethnicity is unknown. By religion, most inhabitants are Orthodox (73.11%), but there are also minorities of Roman Catholics (7.42%) and Pentecostals (3.95%). For 12.6% of the population, religious affiliation is unknown.

Census		Ethnic composition
Year	Population	Romanians	Hungarians	Germans	Roma
1880	4,767	63	65	4,627	–
1890	4,978	44	80	4,816	–
1900	4,566	49	159	4,323	–
1910	3,951	105	159	3,608	72
1920	3,861	73	81	3,646	–
1930	3,791	97	103	3,431	127
1941	3,983	586	220	3,008	–
1956	4,254	–	–	–	–
1966	4,684	2,117	186	2,243	103
1977	4,512	2,302	151	1,918	118
1992	3,458	2,831	218	251	139
2002	3,515	3,025	164	124	181
2011	3,294	2,738	122	85	135
2021	3,031	2,465	80	39	67

== Politics and administration ==
The commune of Biled is administered by a mayor and a local council composed of 12 councilors. The mayor, Ovidiu-Ioan Oprișa, from the National Liberal Party, has been in office since 2020. As from the 2024 local elections, the local council has the following composition by political parties:

Party	Seats	Composition
National Liberal Party	5	
Social Democratic Party	4	
Social Liberal Humanist Party	1	
Save Romania Union–People's Movement Party–Force of the Right	1	
Alliance for the Union of Romanians	1	

== Notable people ==
- Doru Ioan Tărăcilă (b. 1951), Minister of Interior and founder of FSN and PDSR
- Petru Vasile Tomoiagă (b. 1953), poet, prose writer and publicist
