= Bega Canal =

Navigation canal of Romania and Serbia

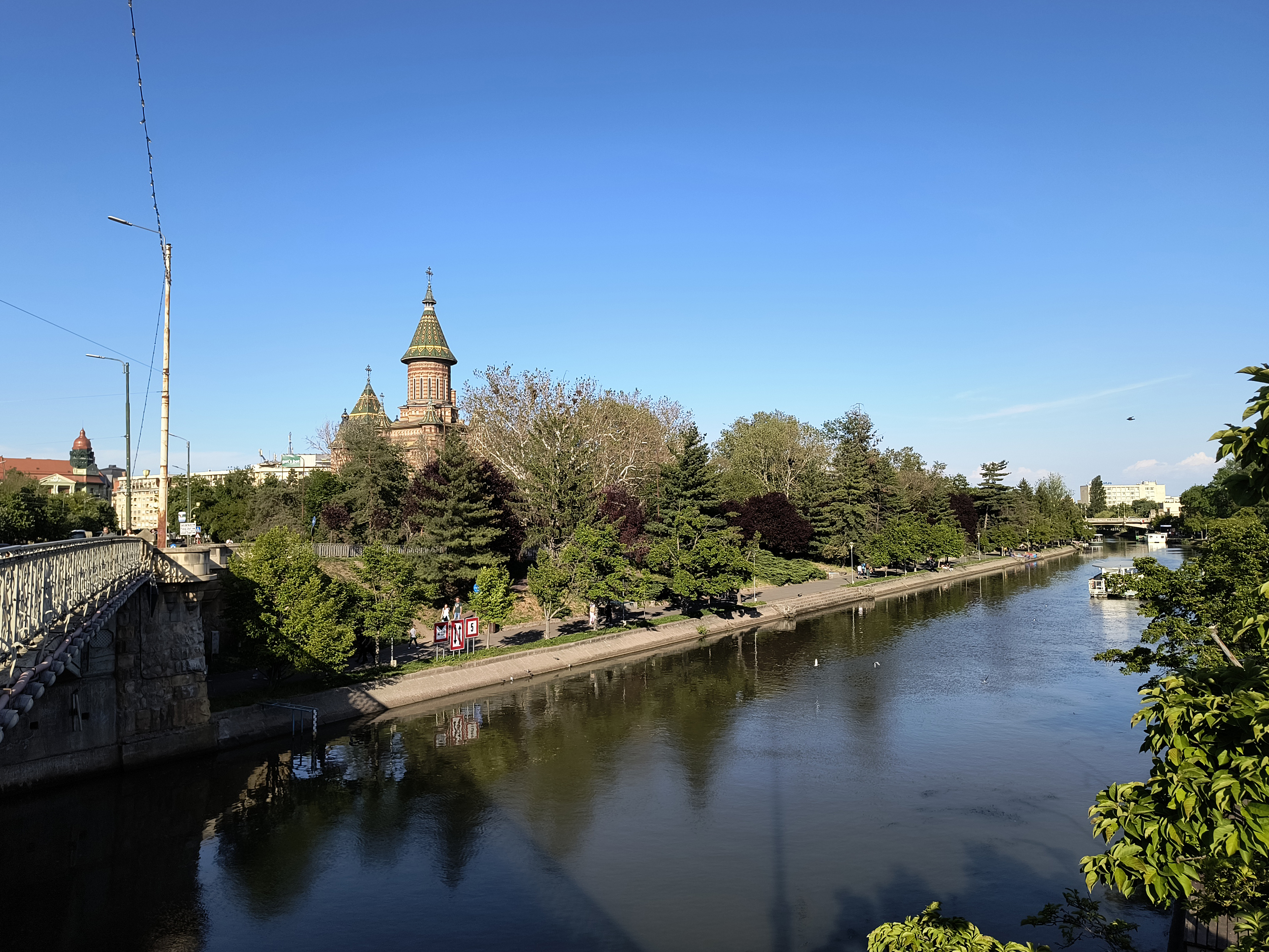
- The Bega Canal as seen from the Michael the Brave Bridge in Timișoara
- Interactive map of Bega Canal
- Country: Romania; Serbia

Specifications
- Length: 114.5 km (71.1 miles)
- Locks: 4 (originally 6)

History
- Construction began: 1735
- Date completed: 1754

Geography
- Direction: SW
- Start point: Timișoara
- End point: near Zrenjanin
- Beginning coordinates: 45.771°N 21.325°E
- Ending coordinates: 45.436°N 20.456°E

The Bega Canal (Romanian: Canalul Bega) or Begej Canal (Serbian: Канал Бегеј, romanized: Kanal Begej) is a navigable canal in Romania and Serbia. It is the first navigable canal built on the present-day territory of Romania and serves the city of Timișoara. Named after the Bega River, the canal runs through Timiș County in western Romania before continuing into Serbia, where it joins the Begej River near the village of Klek. Of its total length of 114.5 km, 44.5 km lie within Romania, while the remaining 70 km run through Serbia.

== History ==
The history of the Bega Canal dates back to 1728, when Count Claude Florimond de Mercy ordered the construction of a canal to help drain the flood-prone areas surrounding Timișoara. This marked the beginning of the canalization of the Bega River upstream from Timișoara towards Făget. Four years later, in 1732, the first vessel travelled along the newly constructed canal as far as Pančevo.

Between 1735 and 1754, a new route was constructed further south, connecting Timișoara with Klek. The original canal was eventually abandoned because sandbars made it difficult to navigate, particularly during the summer months when water levels were low. The new route was considerably straighter and better suited to navigation, although its usability remained highly dependent on fluctuating water levels and seasonal variations in river flow.

The works initiated by Count Mercy were continued by engineer Maximilian Fremaut, who further developed the canalization project by constructing embankments to regulate the course of the Bega River. These measures significantly reduced the risk of flooding in Timișoara and, more importantly, contributed to the drainage of the surrounding marshlands. In 1744, an imperial decree was issued requiring all communities along the Bega Canal to maintain its banks and embankments and to assist in regulating the waterway.

In 1752, the Port of Timișoara, located in the Iosefin district, was already documented. At the time, approximately 20,000 tonnes of goods were transported along the Bega. A year later, the Banat experienced the first catastrophic floods in its history. In response, a new 30-kilometre canal was constructed between Itebej and Jankov Most.

In 1756, the first regulations governing navigation and trade on the Bega were established. Two years later, in 1758, Fremaut began constructing a hydrotechnical node upstream of Timișoara, at Coșteiu on the Timiș River. The system made it possible to transfer water between the Timiș and Bega rivers according to demand. This not only solved the problem of maintaining adequate flow in the Bega Canal but also improved water management in an area historically affected by extensive marshlands and frequent flooding.

In 1775, the Navigation Office of Timișoara was established. Another series of devastating floods struck the Banat region in 1859, inundating 500,000 jugerums of arable land and dozens of villages. The flood on the Bega Canal reached a flow rate of 455 m³/s, far exceeding the canal's designed maximum capacity of 85 m³/s.

In 1869, the first passenger services were introduced on the Bega, making Timișoara the first city in present-day Romania to use this form of public transportation. The Banat was hit by another major flood in 1886, prompting authorities to raise the embankments along the Timiș and Bega rivers by one metre. However, just one year later, a new series of floods struck the region, breaching the recently reinforced embankments.

Between 1910 and 1912, four lock-and-gate complexes were constructed along the Bega Canal—two in Serbia, at Klek and Itebej, and two in Romania, at Uivar and Sânmihaiu Român. Together with the locks at Perlez and Ečka, these structures regulated water levels and ensured almost uninterrupted navigation, even during periods of low water. As a result, the Bega became an important navigable waterway, capable of accommodating vessels with a carrying capacity of up to 500 tonnes during the first half of the 20th century.

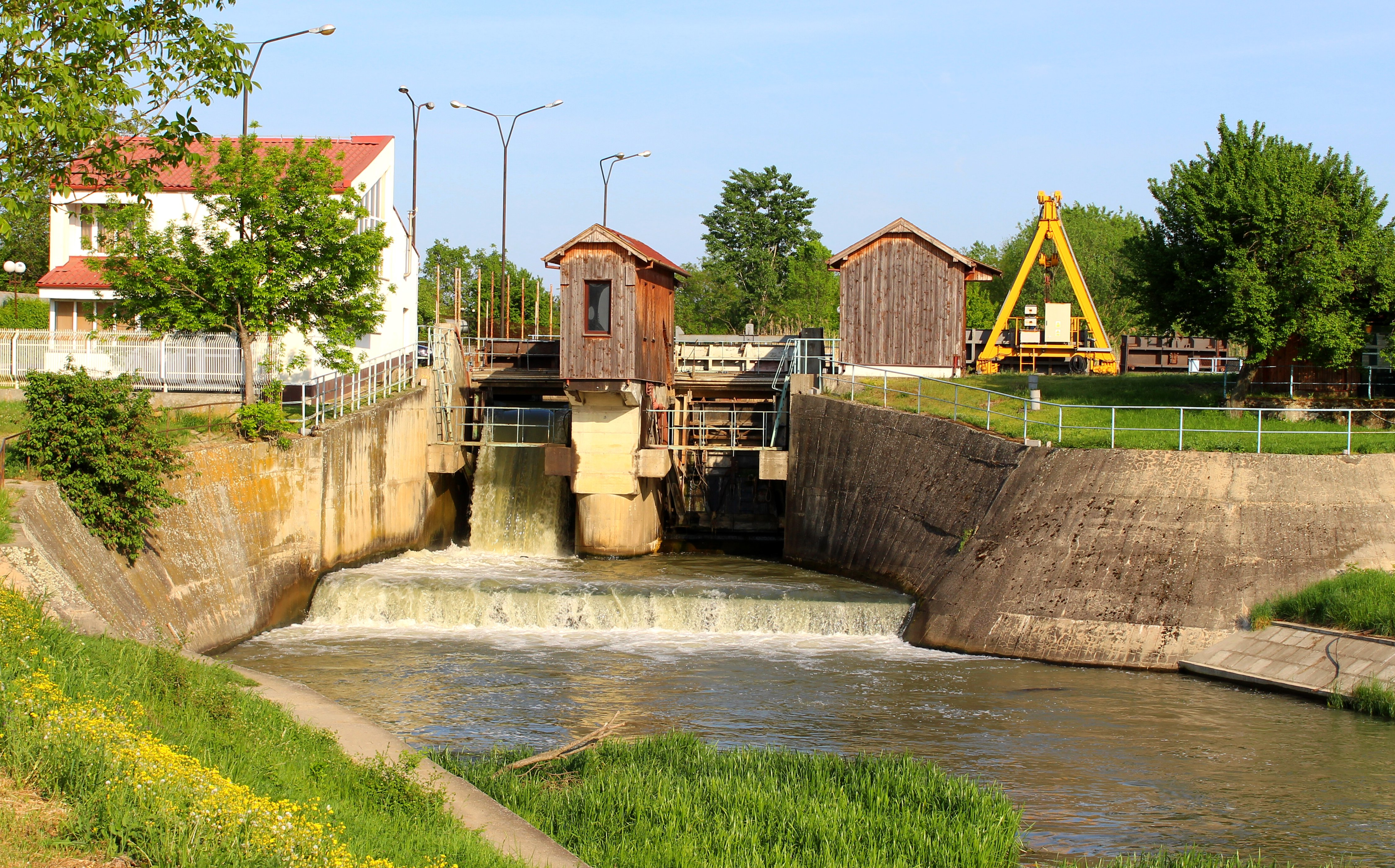
The sluice of the Timișoara hydroelectric power plant

On 3 May 1910, the hydroelectric power plant in Timișoara's Fabric district was commissioned. It harnessed the waters of the Bega Canal to generate electricity and is considered one of the oldest hydroelectric power plants in Romania. In 1912, another series of floods struck the Banat region, affecting settlements including Cebza, Macedonia, and Petroman. That same year, 415,000 quintals of goods were loaded at the Port of Timișoara, of which 310,000 quintals consisted of wheat and flour, while approximately 200,000 quintals of goods were unloaded. In 1917, 563 commercial vessels were registered on the Bega Canal, operating for 305 days of the year. In 1937, the Otelec Port Office was established. Between 1937 and 1938, the volume of goods transported along the Bega reached a peak of approximately 250,000 tonnes per year.

Passenger transport on the Bega reached its peak in 1944, with approximately 500,000 passengers recorded that year. In 1945, the bridges in Timișoara and Otelec that had been destroyed by bombing during World War II were removed from the canal bed. The war severely disrupted traffic on the waterway, and commercial freight transport was eventually discontinued in 1958. Passenger vessels were withdrawn in 1967, effectively bringing regular passenger services to an end. Nevertheless, records from the Timișoara Port Authority in 1986 still listed 20 operational vessels registered for use on the Bega Canal.

=== After 1990 ===
In the early 1990s, plans were proposed to rehabilitate the Bega Canal and restore navigation for both freight transport and recreational passenger services. However, negotiations with the Yugoslav authorities failed. Traian Băsescu, who was Minister of Transport at the time, strongly opposed the project, while the Timișoara municipal authorities and the Timiș Water Administration struggled to find a viable solution for dredging and restoring the canal.

In 2019, the Bega Canal was included in a comprehensive Romania–Serbia cross-border rehabilitation project, with 85% of the funding provided by the European Union. As part of the project, the locks at Sânmihaiu Român, Srpski Itebej, and Klek were rehabilitated, while navigation signs were installed along the navigable section on the Romanian side. International navigation was eventually resumed in 2023.

== Locks ==
The lock system was constructed between 1900 and 1916 to ensure safe and reliable navigation along the entire waterway throughout the year. The Bega Canal has six locks in total—two in Romania and four in Serbia, two of which are no longer in operation. With the exception of the Klek lock, all the others have a single chamber. The locks are up to 70 metres long and 10 metres wide, while their navigable depth varies depending on the location. The locks in Romania have a draft of 1.5 metres.

No.	Name	Coordinates	Country	Notes
1	Sânmihaiu Român lock	45.7085706°N 21.1048981°E	Romania	Put back into operation in 2022
2	Uivar lock	45.6556822°N 20.9242207°E	Romania	In operational condition
3	Srpski Itebej lock	45.5787672°N 20.7520401°E	Serbia	Decommissioned
4	Klek lock	45.4410759°N 20.4587377°E	Serbia	In operational condition
5	Ečka lock	45.3203385°N 20.4299914°E	Serbia	Decommissioned
6	Perlez lock	45.2427783°N 20.386237°E	Serbia	In operational condition

== Ports ==
=== Port of Timișoara ===
The Port of Timișoara was located on the left bank of the Bega Canal, along the stretch between Iuliu Maniu Bridge and Gelu Walkway. The quay used for mooring barges extended for approximately 450 metres. On the opposite bank, roughly midway along this section, stands the Iosefin Water Tower.

Today, remnants of the old cobblestone paving can still be seen, characteristic of the early 20th century. The canal is approximately 25 metres wide in this area. On the official map of Timișoara, produced in Budapest in 1912, the port area is marked as the Danube Navigation Agency (Hungarian: Dunagőzhajózási ügynökség). However, documentary records of the port date back to 1860. The Port Captaincy building once stood on the site now occupied by the Anchor Palace.

== Pumping stations ==
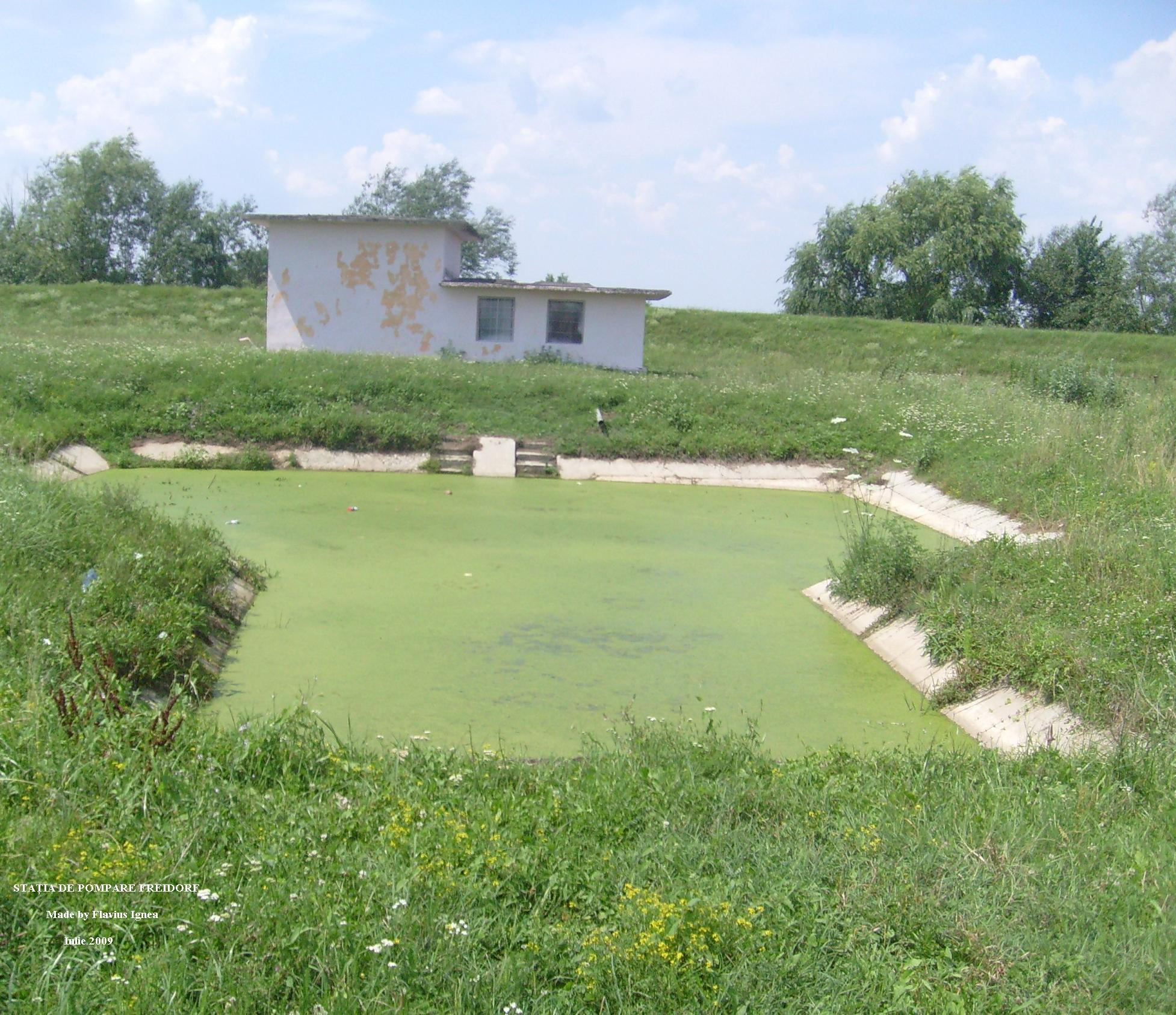
Freidorf pumping station, currently non-functional

In addition to its role as a transport waterway, the Bega Canal has also been used for agricultural purposes. Following the collectivization of agriculture and the establishment of Collective Agricultural Production Cooperatives (CAP), water from the Bega was used to irrigate approximately 2,075 hectares of land, consisting mainly of rice fields and vegetable crops.

To support irrigation, an extensive network of pumping stations was established along the Bega Canal. These facilities served not only for irrigation but also as part of the flood-control system, pumping excess water from the Bega onto the surrounding fields and thereby helping to reduce flood levels.

The pumping stations also played an important role in drainage. Since large areas of the Banat region have historically been prone to waterlogging and marsh formation, excess water was pumped into the Bega Canal to help drain and reclaim the surrounding land.

No.	Name	Location	Bank	Notes
1	Solventul	Timișoara	Right	Previously used for industrial purposes. Currently non-functional.
2	CET Timișoara Sud	Timișoara	Left	Used to supply water to the Timișoara South Thermal Power Plant.
3	Freidorf	Timișoara	Left	Currently non-functional.
4	Utvin	Utvin	Right	Currently non-functional.
5	Sânmihaiu Român	Sânmihaiu Român	Left	It is located near the lock. It is in working condition.
6	Uivar	Uivar	Left	It is located near the lock. It is in working condition.
7	Pustiniș	Pustiniș	Right	It is in working condition.
8	Otelec I	Otelec	Left	Damaged in the 2005 floods. Modernized, in working condition. High-capacity station.
9	Otelec II	Otelec	Right	It is in working condition.
