= Corneliu Miklosi Public Transport Museum =

- Muzeul de Transport Public „Corneliu Miklosi”
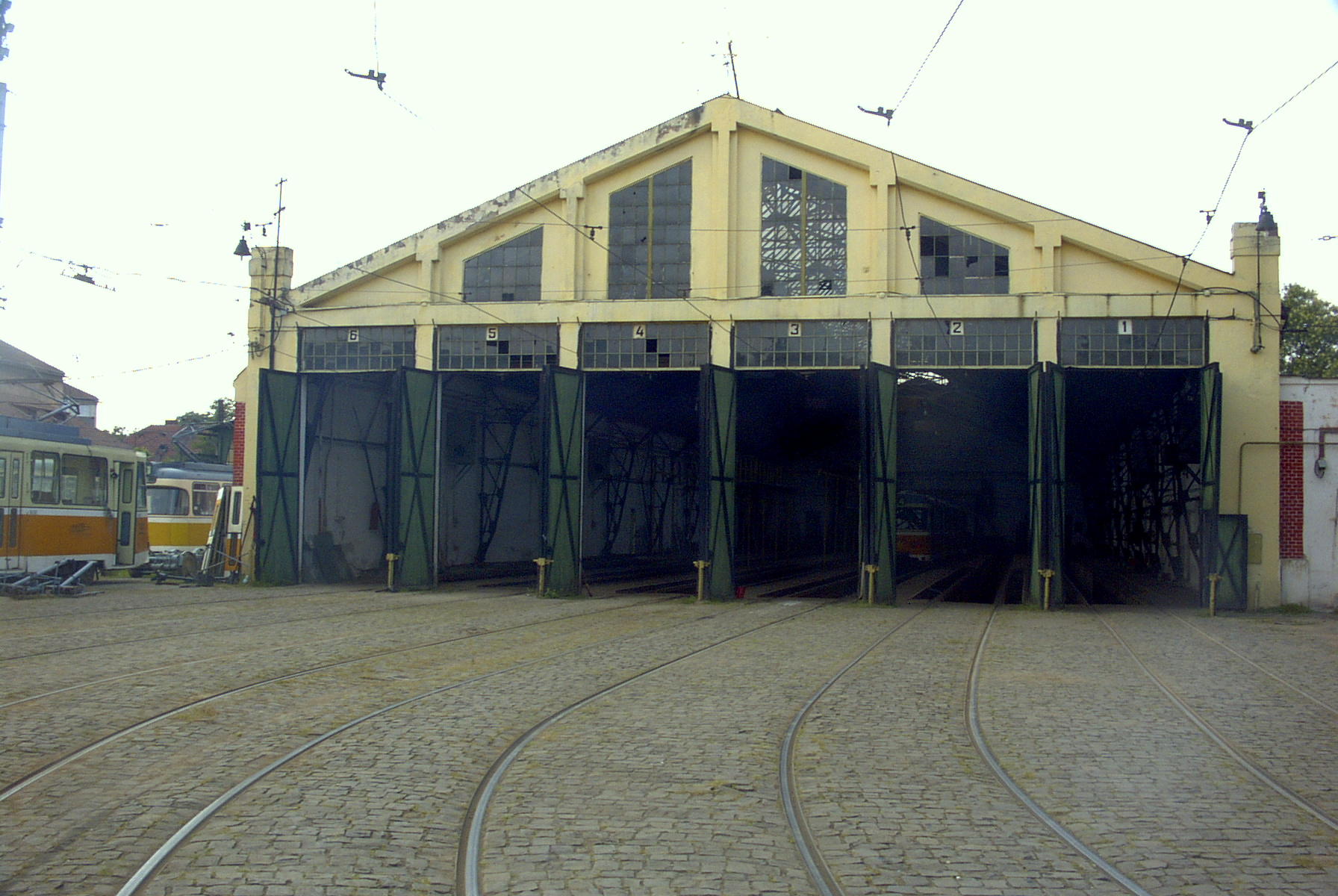
- Former tram depot no. 1, the main exhibition space
- Established: 2007
- Location: 83 Take Ionescu Boulevard, Timișoara, Romania
- Coordinates: 45°45′46″N 21°14′44″E
- Type: Transport museum
- Accreditation: National Heritage Institute
- Collections: History; Science and technology
- Owner: Timișoara Public Transport Company

Corneliu Miklosi Public Transport Museum (Romanian: Muzeul de Transport Public „Corneliu Miklosi”) is a museum dedicated to the history of public transport in Timișoara, Romania, managed by the local transport operator STPT. The building that houses the museum was a repair hall from 1927, today reimagined as the MultipeXity Center for Art, Technology, and Experiment. The museum's collection includes 24 exhibits representing several types of wagons (from horse-drawn to electric-powered), trams, trolleybuses, buses, but also various technical or manual equipment.

== History ==
The horse-drawn tram began operating on the streets of Timișoara on 8 July 1868, with the first route running between Gara de Nord and the city center. It was the third line of its kind in the world, the first being in New York and the second in Paris. Electric trams were introduced in 1899, and by 1920, tram production had started locally in Timișoara.

In 1868, the first wooden shed—designed to house 24 wagons along with horse stables—was built in the center of Timișoara's Fabric district, near the Hydroelectric Plant. Due to urban planning changes, it was relocated to its current site between 1873 and 1874. By 1876, an existing building at the new location was adapted to serve as the tram company's office and the residence of its director. A shed with five tracks was also constructed in the courtyard, along with a blacksmith's workshop for horse shoeing and additional stables. Following the introduction of the electric tram in 1899, the facility began to be restructured to meet the new operational requirements. Between 1898 and 1899, a building complex known as the "Central Electric Establishment" was constructed. By the end of the 19th century, it included the administration building, a wagon depot with a 25-wagon capacity, repair workshops, and a warehouse located at the rear of the depot. In 1909, a second depot—matching the size and design of the first—was built adjacent to the original, and the wagon repair workshop was expanded at the same time.

A second phase of construction on the site occurred between 1920 and 1926, during which the depot complex was expanded and additional facilities were introduced. Following a major fire in October 1920 that destroyed the workshops, the old warehouse, and damaged the roofs of the depots and the new warehouse, new workshops were built in 1921. These upgrades enabled the Timișoara tram company to begin building and repairing all of its tram wagons on-site starting in 1922.

The third phase in the development of the complex took place between 1926 and 1927, marked by the construction of a third tram depot on the opposite side of the street. This new facility featured six tracks and a capacity for 36 trams. Over the years, the tram depot buildings have seen numerous modifications, expansions, and the addition of new structures. Today, Timișoara's tram network consists of seven lines, 122 stations, and spans 71.4 kilometers, with a standard gauge of 1,435 mm.

=== Museum ===
The tram depot located at 83 Take Ionescu Boulevard was converted into the Corneliu Miklosi Public Transport Museum. Its origins date back to 2000, when the non-profit association Tram Club Banat was founded. This association brings together the Timișoara Autonomous Transport Authority, along with the transport authorities of Arad and Reșița, with the mission of preserving and restoring historic trams and promoting the study of public transportation.

The structure, covering 2,148 square meters, is built with metal trusses and brick masonry and consists of five interconnected halls. In the museum courtyard stands the former dispatch tower, measuring 5.9 meters in height. The five connected spaces are well-suited for hosting exhibitions, art installations, performances, debates, and a wide range of events.

The museum has also hosted commemorative events and special occasions, such as "Transporter's Day," and is frequently visited by groups of enthusiasts from both Romania and abroad.

== Heritage buildings ==
The tram depot is located in the southwestern part of Fabric, the city's former industrial district. The site is split by Take Ionescu Boulevard, a major thoroughfare connecting Fabric with downtown Timișoara. The depot complex is part of a larger urban area that includes several significant historical and urban landmarks such as the East Train Station, the nearby Sock Factory, the Badea Cârțan Market, and a protected former industrial housing neighborhood. The complex itself consists of multiple buildings, several of which hold high heritage value, including the maintenance and repair workshops, tram depot no. 1, the tram painting workshop, and the worker locker rooms.

=== Maintenance and repair workshops ===
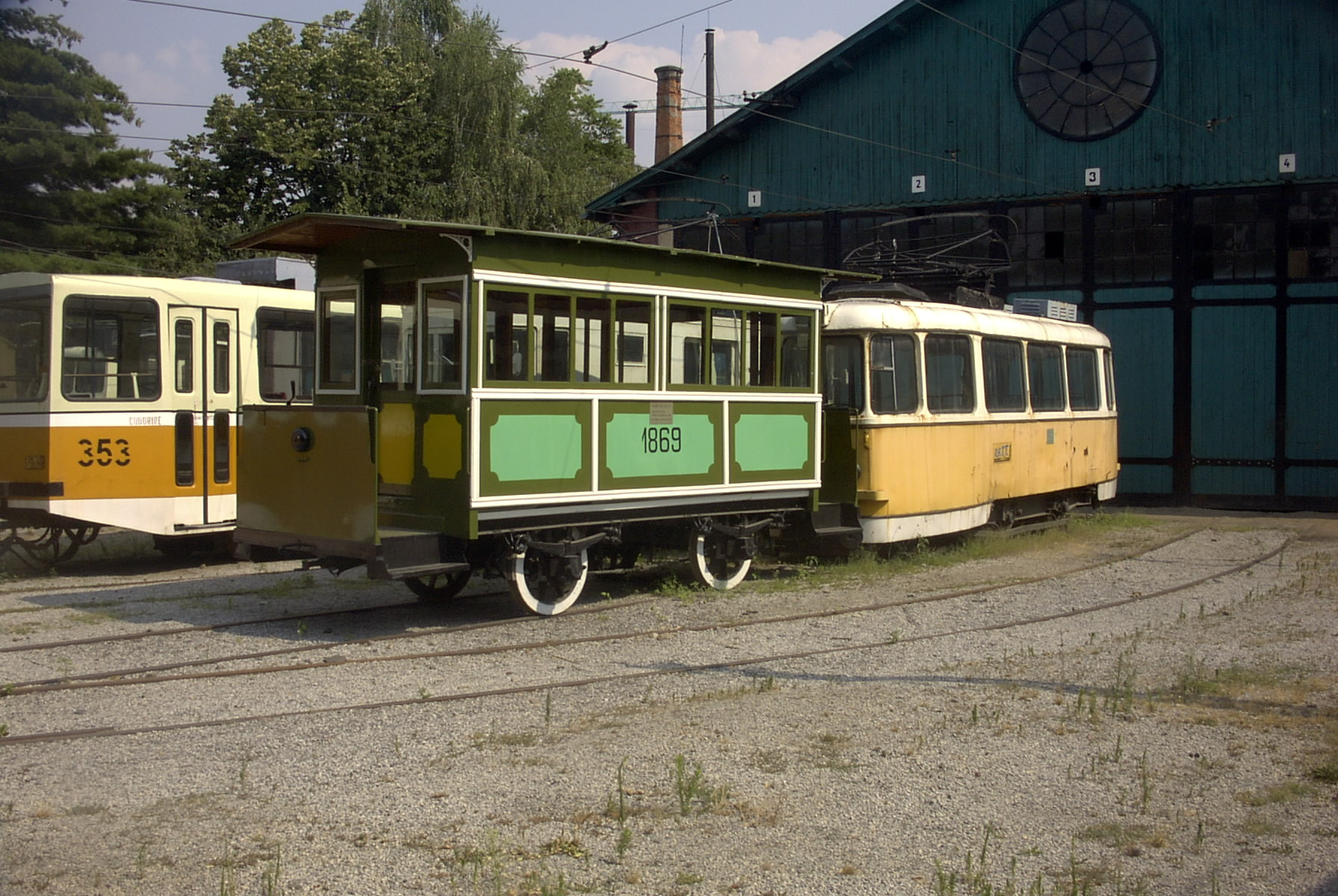
Replica of the horse-drawn tram in front of the maintenance and repair workshop

The maintenance and repair workshop consists of two similar halls: the first was built around 1898–1899, and the second around 1909. Initially, the first hall functioned as a tram depot with a capacity for 25 wagons. Both halls have a rectangular layout measuring approximately 56.65 by 18.27 meters and are equipped with five tram tracks and a maintenance pit each. The walls and foundations are made of brick, while the roof structure features riveted T-shaped steel lattice beams, with wooden purlins running lengthwise to support the roof decking and sheeting. Each hall has an interior height of 6.2 meters and includes three skylights integrated into the roof structure.

The main façade of these former tram depots is dominated by five large double wooden gates set within metal frames. Above the gates runs a continuous strip of windows, topped by a wooden gable and a circular window positioned along the central axis of each façade, emphasizing the building's symmetry.

=== Tram depot no. 1 ===
In 1927, this depot building was designed as part of a series of projects led by Corneliu Miklosi, then director of Timișoara Communal Trams. It was officially inaugurated in October of the same year. At the time, the structure was considered groundbreaking, featuring advanced structural solutions and state-of-the-art functional innovations for an industrial facility. The hall was equipped with six tram lines, along with water supply and sewage systems, and could accommodate up to 36 tram wagons. Alongside the construction of the new tram depot, several additional facilities were added, including workers' dormitories, various workshops, a medical office, and a new depot for electric locomotives.

Tram depot no. 1 has retained its original architectural and structural features. The hall has a rectangular layout, measuring 66.13 meters in length and 29.6 meters in width. Its walls are constructed from brick, while the roof is supported by 10 metal frames, each composed of three joints. The structural system features T-shaped metal lattice beams, I-shaped metal purlins, and longitudinal metal bracing—creating a straightforward yet innovative design. Natural light enters the hall through a Wema steel-frame skylight, centrally positioned along the roof's axis.

The main façade is fully spanned by six wooden doors, each 4.5 meters high and set within a steel framework. Above these doors, a row of six steel-framed windows forms a balanced composition of solid and transparent elements. The gable, created by the dual-pitched roof, is filled with four trapezoidal glazed panels that mirror the roof's slope, enhancing the visual rhythm of the structure.

=== Tram painting workshop ===
The first workshop, initially intended for polishing wagons, was built around 1920 during the first expansion phase of the tram depot complex. It originally accommodated two wagons and was equipped with radiator heating powered by its own boiler. In 1926, the workshop was renovated and expanded to include two tracks, increasing its capacity to five wagons. This expansion was coordinated with the addition of a boiler room and a locker area, both designed around the same period.

The former polishing workshop, now functioning as the tram painting workshop, has undergone several modifications over time, yet it still retains enough original elements to contribute to the historical value of the complex. The workshop is laid out as a 9.65 × 27.05 meter rectangle, connected to both a boiler room and a locker area, forming an L-shaped floor plan. Its walls are constructed from 50 cm thick brick. The original hall has been altered, most notably by replacing the original metal roof structure with concrete floors. As a result, the skylights and main façade now appear disconnected from the current floor plan, serving as a reminder of the original dual-pitched roof. The attached boiler room at the rear has also been modified, including changes to its façade, though it retains a structure similar to that of the main workshop. The chimney, however, has preserved its original form—it is built of brick, features a circular shaft, and stands on a prismatic base measuring 2.15 meters, with a total height of 18 meters.

The main façade of the paint shop is structured with pilaster strips that frame plastered panels, giving it a defined and rhythmic appearance. It features two large arched windows with metal frames. Positioned directly across from the main hall of the maintenance and repair workshop, this building shares a similar architectural style, enhancing the overall cohesion and heritage value of the tram depot complex. The façade is lined from end to end with wooden doors set in metal frames, topped by a continuous strip of glazing. Above this, a plastered gable is capped with a decorative row of bricks, adding to the visual character of the structure.

=== Workers' locker rooms ===
Located at the rear of the tram depot complex, adjacent to the main former depots and workshops, the locker room facility was constructed around 1920. The building has an almost square footprint, measuring 15.46 by 16.1 meters, and is divided into two main sections: locker rooms and bathrooms.

The workers' locker room is constructed from brick, with walls 55 cm thick and a series of central masonry pillars, each measuring 55 × 55 cm, aligned along the building's central axis. These pillars support a longitudinal wooden beam measuring 30 × 40 cm, which in turn carries a partially exposed wooden lattice roof structure reinforced with intermediate wooden supports. At the point where the locker room connects to the workshops, the original structure was modified by adding a wooden floor above the bathroom area. This upper level now houses an archive and an office.

The main façade was originally designed around a central axis of symmetry, highlighted by the entrance and a gable featuring a circular mullioned steel window. Brick pilaster strips define the upper section of the façade, adding structure and rhythm.

== Collection ==
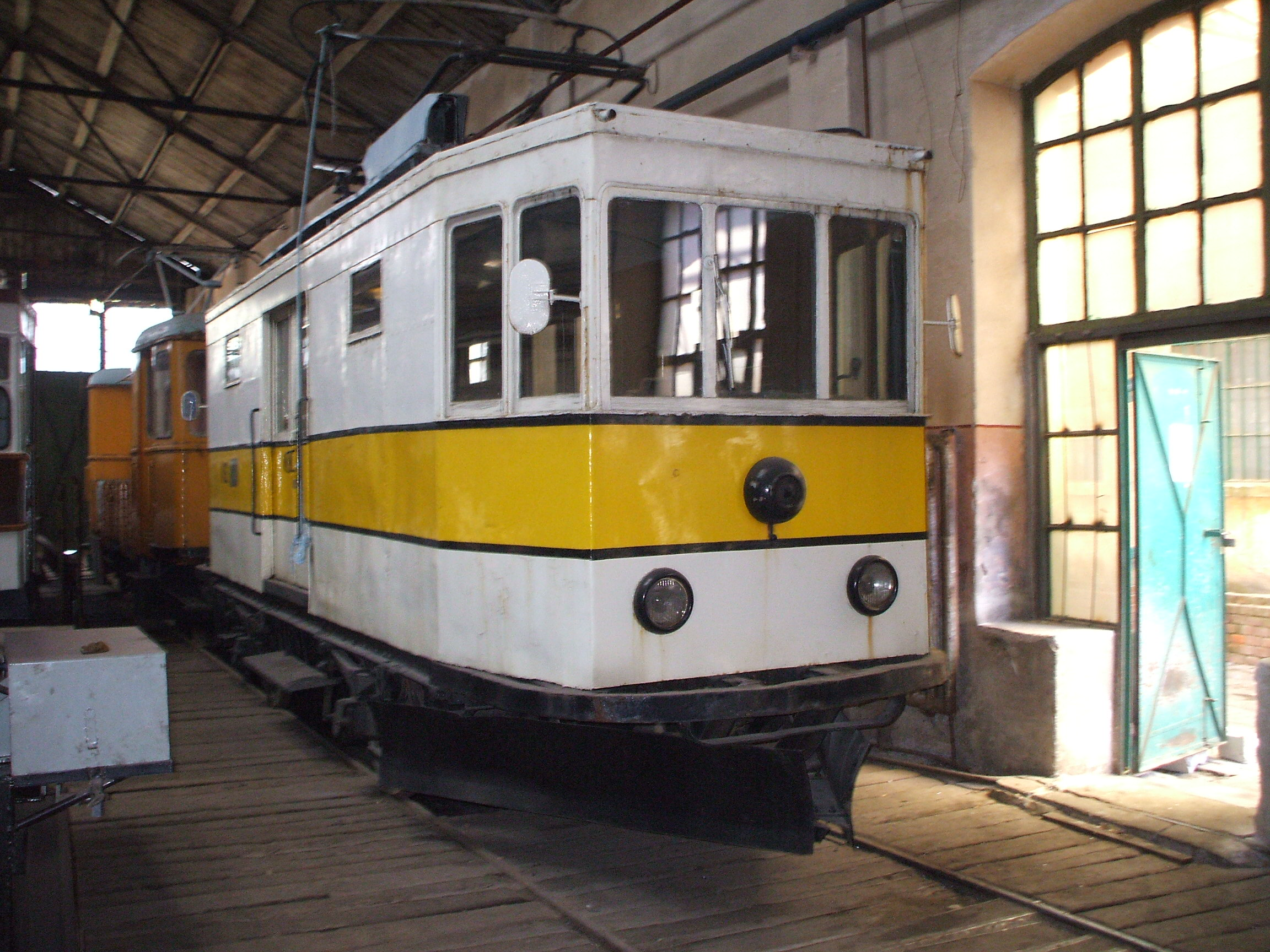
VS1 snowplow wagon

The museum is home to the first tram that operated in Romania—specifically, the horse-drawn tram that began service in 1869 and remained in use for thirty years, until the introduction of electric trams in 1899. This historically significant piece was restored in 1994 to mark the 125th anniversary of its debut in Timișoara. Constructed from metal and wood and fitted with glass windows, the tram was pulled by two horses and stopped using a lever-operated brake. It could accommodate up to twenty passengers—twelve seated on wooden benches and eight standing.

Another notable exhibit is the "Gemenele," a tram consisting of a locomotive and carriage, built in 1927. The museum also received a platform wagon with two engines and pulleys for lifting heavy materials, manufactured in 1906, as a donation from a German museum. Additionally, the Mariazell Tram Museum in Austria contributed platform wagons, while the city of Vienna donated an L-type passenger carriage.

The museum's collection also features the Electroputere V54 wagon, the Timiș T1-62 motor wagon, the ITB V58 wagon, the Düwag GT8N tram, and the Timiș 2 train, which includes a motor wagon and a trailer wagon. On display are also utility vehicles such as the Lowry wagon, a snowplow wagon, and a grinder wagon. Additionally, the museum houses three buses and ten trolleybuses—both solo and articulated—with the oldest dating back to 1960 and the newest from 1996.
