= V54 =

V54 may refer to:

- Electroputere V54, a Romanian tram
- Utva V-54 Lasta, a Serbian trainer aircraft
- Vanadium-54, an isotope of vanadium
- Vultee V-54, an American trainer aircraft prototype
- Aérospatiale Alouette II (V-54), French light utility helicopter
