= Rajko Kapelan =

Serbian politician

Rajko Kapelan (Serbian Cyrillic: Рајко Капелан; born 9 October 1992) is a Serbian politician. He was elected to the National Assembly of Serbia in the 2020 parliamentary election as a member of the Serbian Progressive Party.

== Early life and private career ==
Kapelan was born in the village of Klek, near Zrenjanin, Vojvodina, in the Republic of Serbia, in what was then the Federal Republic of Yugoslavia. He still resides in the community and is a professional economist.

== Politician ==
=== Municipal politics ===
Kapelan received the twenty-sixth position on the Progressive Party's electoral list for the Zrenjanin city assembly in the 2016 Serbian local elections and was elected when the list won a majority victory with thirty-five out of sixty-seven mandates. Kapelan served for the next four years as a supporter of the local government; he was also a member of the Progressive Party's Academy of Young Leaders program during this time. He did not seek re-election in 2020.

=== Parliamentarian ===
Kapelan was given the sixteenth position on the Progressive Party's Aleksandar Vučić — For Our Children list for the 2020 Serbian parliamentary election. This was tantamount to election, and he was indeed elected when the list won a landslide majority with 188 out of 250 mandates. He is a member of the assembly committee on Kosovo–Metohija, a deputy member of the committee on the diaspora and Serbs in the region, a deputy member of the European Union–Serbia stabilization and association committee, the head of Serbia's parliamentary friendship group with India, and a member of the parliamentary friendship groups with Argentina, Australia, Austria, the Bahamas, Bosnia and Herzegovina, Botswana, Brazil, Cameroon, the Central African Republic, Chile, China, Comoros, Croatia, Cuba, Cyprus, the Czech Republic, the Dominican Republic, Ecuador, Egypt, Equatorial Guinea, Eritrea, France, Germany, Greece, Grenada, Guinea-Bissau, Hungary, Israel, Italy, Jamaica, Japan, Kyrgyzstan, Laos, Liberia, Madagascar, Mali, Mauritius, Mexico, Montenegro, Mozambique, Nauru, the Netherlands, Nicaragua, Nigeria, North Macedonia, Palau, Papua New Guinea, Paraguay, Portugal, Qatar, the Republic of Congo, Romania, Russia, Saint Vincent and the Grenadines, Sao Tome and Principe, the Solomon Islands, South Africa, South Sudan, Spain, Sri Lanka, Sudan, Suriname, Switzerland, Togo, Trinidad and Tobago, Turkey, the United Arab Emirates, the United Kingdom, the United States of America, Uruguay, and Uzbekistan.
