= Coat of arms of Timișoara =

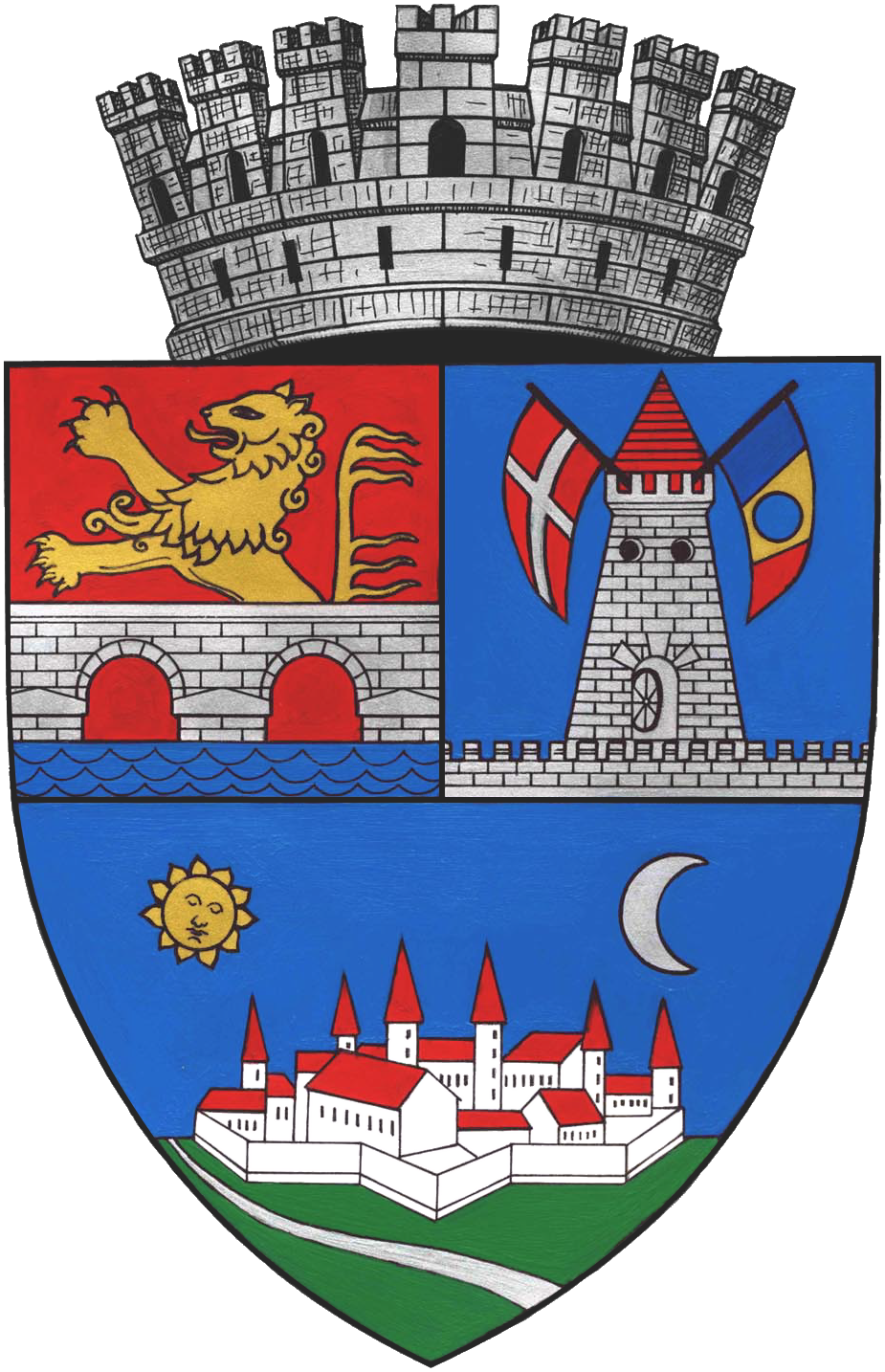
- Armiger: City of Timișoara
- Adopted: 1995
- Crest: A silver mural crown with seven towers
- Use: On the city hall's and local council's documents

The current coat of arms of Timișoara was adopted in 1995 and modified in 2009.

== Description and symbolism ==
The shield is divided into two parts by a horizontal line (parted per fess), and the upper half is further divided into two equal parts by a vertical line (parted per pale). On the heraldic right (viewers' left) of the upper part, on a crimson field, over natural waves, a double-arched silver bridge built of hewn stone (Trajan's Bridge) is represented, from which a golden lion emerges. The golden lion is the historical symbol of Banat, as depicted on the coat of arms of Banat and Oltenia designed in 1921 by József Sebestyén. On the left side (viewer's right), on a sky blue field stands a stone water tower over a body of water, with double cornices, two round windows upstairs and a gate revealing an iron water wheel downstairs. The tower symbolizes to be an 18th-century construction, providing water to the city from the Bega Canal. On the tower are two flags: the historical flag of Timișoara and the flag of the Romanian Revolution of 1989 that started in the city. The red flag with a silver cross is also the flag of Savoy, as used by Eugene of Savoy – the man who liberated Timișoara from the Turks. The addition of the tricolor flag commemorates both the importance of the city in the revolution and the death toll suffered by the city during the events, for which it has been proclaimed by law a martyr city.

In the bottom part of the shield lies the image of the medieval city with its public and industrial buildings, surrounded by the citadels of the former fortress and the Bega Canal. Above the city are an anthropomorphic Sun and a waning crescent Moon (symbol of the Turks defeated by the Christians), a common symbolism in Romania and especially in Transylvania and Banat.

Until the changes in 2009, since the coat of arms from 1995 was not approved by the Government, the larger shield featured a smaller shield, divided party-per-cross, with the first and fourth quarter argent, and the second and third sable. This is the insignia of the Royal House of Hohenzollern-Sigmaringen, the ruling dynasty of Romania until the abolition of monarchy in the coup of 1947.

Above the shield is a silver mural crown, symbolizing the status of the city as county seat municipality.

== History ==
The city's first recorded coat of arms dates back to 1781, when Timișoara was proclaimed a royal free city with the right to its own coat of arms and seal. The shield has remained relatively unchanged in history – the only changes since the 19th century have been the replacement of a baroque cartouche with a shield, the replacement of a gold crown with diamonds with a mural crown, the removal of the supporters (two sable horses) and addition of the Romanian revolutionary flag after 1989.

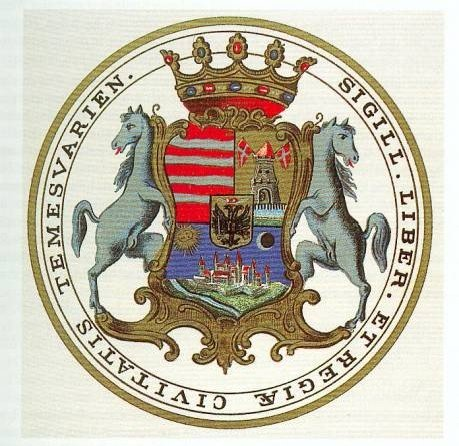
As a royal free city (1781)

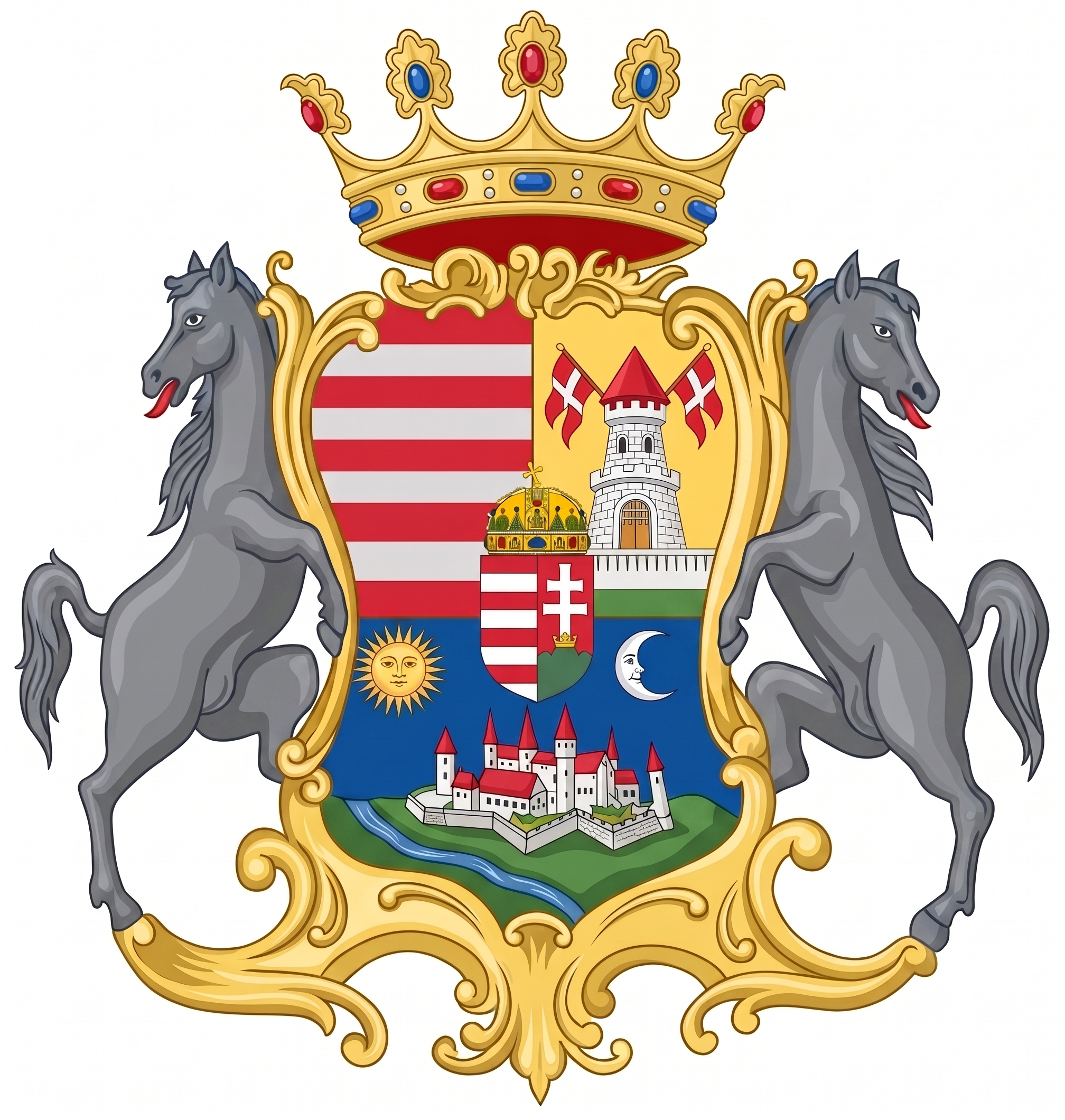
During Austro-Hungarian rule (1867-1919)

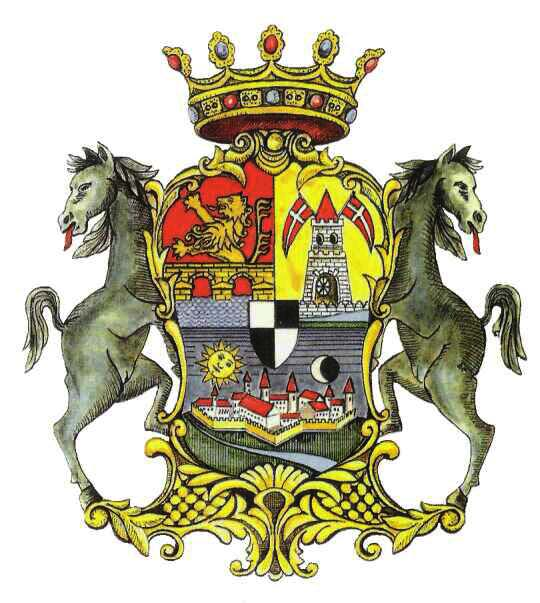
After the union of Banat with Romania (1919)

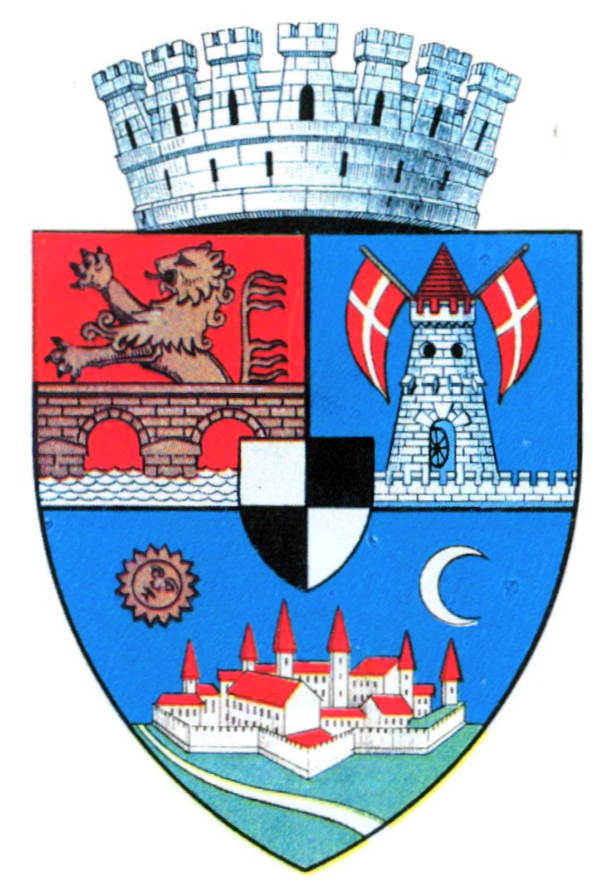
In the interwar period

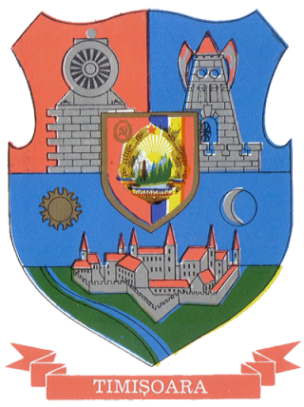
Under the Socialist Republic of Romania

Until 2009
