= Uivar =

- Commune
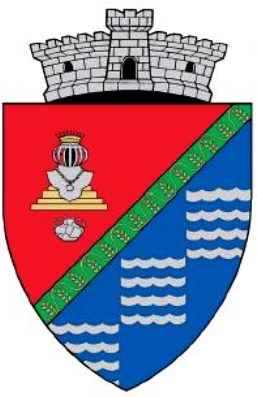
- Coat of arms

- Location in Timiș County

- Location in Romania
- Coordinates: 45°39′N 20°54′E
- Country: Romania
- County: Timiș
- Established: 1811

Government
  - Mayor (2020–): Bogdan-Gheorghe Săvulescu (PSD)
- Area: 97.1 km^{2} (37.5 sq mi)
- Population (2021-12-01): 2,471
  - Density: 25.4/km^{2} (65.9/sq mi)
- Time zone: UTC+02:00 (EET)
  - Summer (DST): UTC+03:00 (EEST)
- Postal code: 307445–307451
- Vehicle reg.: TM
- Website: www.primariauivar.ro

Uivar (Hungarian: Újvár; German: Neuburg an der Bega; Serbian: Ујвар, romanized: Ujvar) is a commune in Timiș County, Romania. It is composed of four villages: Pustiniș, Răuți, Sânmartinu Maghiar and Uivar (commune seat). Two other villages, Otelec and Iohanisfeld, which had been part of Uivar commune since 1968, were split off in 2008 to form Otelec commune.

== Geography ==
Uivar is situated in the lowland area of the Banat Plain, which, prior to the hydro-improvement works of the 18th century, was a vast marshland dotted with occasional gravel patches. The terrain is flat, with elevations ranging from 75 to 85 meters, and is bordered by a network of meanders, oxbow lakes, and large depressions.

Uivar is located within the Timiș–Bega hydrographic basin. The main watercourses in the area include the Bega Canal, the Beregsău and Timișat streams, and the Țeba–Timișat Canal, all complemented by an extensive network of drainage canals. The Bega Canal traverses the commune from east to southwest over a length of 22 km. The Țeba and Timișat, now regulated, were formerly natural branches of the Bega River prior to its canalization.

== History ==
Remains of Neolithic, Daco-Roman and medieval settlements were discovered on the territory of the commune. Archaeological excavations here revealed a Neolithic settlement from the 5th millennium BC that belongs to the Vinča culture.

The first recorded mention of Uivar dates from 1811, when 50 German families were colonized here. Each family then received 32 jugers of arable land. In 1851 a new wave of colonization took place, this time with Hungarians from the Szeged area and Germans. The village then became German-Hungarian, but over time the Hungarian element dissipated, leaving an overwhelming majority of Germans. After World War II, their number began to decline sharply and they were gradually replaced by Romanians from other parts of Banat as well as Vojvodina, Transylvania, Western Moldavia and Oltenia. Today the village is mostly Romanian.

== Demographics ==
Ethnic composition (2021)
1. Romanians (74.1%)
2. Hungarians (9.42%)
3. Roma (4.93%)
4. Others (11.6%)
Religious composition (2021)
1. Orthodox (60.0%)
2. Roman Catholics (14.2%)
3. Greek Catholics (9.26%)
4. Pentecostals (3.56%)
5. Unknown (11.0%)
6. Others (1.85%)
7. Irreligious, atheists and agnostics (0.16%)

Uivar had a population of 2,471 inhabitants at the 2021 census, up 0.73% from the 2011 census. Most inhabitants are Romanians (74.09%), larger minorities being represented by Hungarians (9.42%) and Roma (4.93%). By religion, most inhabitants are Orthodox (60.01%), but there are also minorities of Roman Catholics (14.16%), Greek Catholics (9.26%) and Pentecostals (3.56%). For 11% of the population, religious affiliation is unknown.

Census		Ethnic composition
Year	Population	Romanians	Hungarians	Germans	Roma	Serbs
1880	3,928	684	1,730	1,487	–	20
1890	4,884	704	1,709	2,407	–	47
1900	5,109	770	1,766	2,390	–	168
1910	4,925	868	1,895	2,075	–	59
1920	1,964 (Note: Data on the populations of Pustiniș and Uivar missing)	22	1,517	418	–	–
1930	4,889	942	1,934	1,922	56	29
1941	4,610	868	1,807	1,823	–	–
1956	4,620	–	–	–	–	–
1966	4,128	2,035	1,404	657	5	26
1977	3,525	1,988	1,052	417	51	12
1992	2,687	1,818	673	62	122	9
2002	2,716	1,946	567	38	147	7
2011	2,453	1,810	394	17	114	5
2021	2,471	1,831	233	7	122	8

== Politics and administration ==
The commune of Uivar is administered by a mayor and a local council composed of 13 councilors. The mayor, Bogdan-Gheorghe Săvulescu, from the Social Democratic Party, has been in office since 2020. As from the 2024 local elections, the local council has the following composition by political parties:

Party	Seats	Composition
Social Democratic Party	8	
Alliance for the Union of Romanians	4	
Democratic Alliance of Hungarians in Romania	1	

== Notable people ==
- Viorica Ioja (b. 1962), rowing coxswain
