= Otelec =

Otelec Ótelek
- Commune
- Location in Timiș County

- Location in Romania
- Coordinates: 45°37′N 20°51′E
- Country: Romania
- County: Timiș

Government
  - Mayor (2020–): Simona-Silvia Fechete (PNL)
- Area: 83.14 km^{2} (32.10 sq mi)
- Population (2021-12-01): 1,657
  - Density: 20/km^{2} (52/sq mi)
- Time zone: EET/EEST (UTC+2/+3)
- Postal code: 307446–307447
- Vehicle reg.: TM
- Website: www.comunaotelec.ro

Otelec (known as Ungureni in the interwar period; Hungarian: Ótelek; Serbian: Отелек, romanized: Otelek) is a commune in Timiș County, Romania. Established in 1856, it was abolished in 1968 and absorbed into Uivar. It was recreated in 2008. It is composed of two villages, Iohanisfeld and Otelec (commune seat).

== History ==
Otelec was first mentioned in 1452 as Feltelek, when it belonged to Keve County. During the Ottoman period (16th–17th centuries) the locality was depopulated, and the uncultivated lands were transformed into swamps. It was not until 1793–1795, under the Habsburgs, that the settlement was re-established with families of colonists, mostly Hungarians, brought by Count Johann von Buttler from the southern counties of the empire. From 1856, it became an independent commune. At the same time, the first state school was opened (extended in 1885) and the construction of the Roman Catholic church was completed.

Iohanisfeld was founded by German (Banat Swabian) settlers in 1805, about 90 years after the beginning of the colonization of Banat. They came mostly from neighboring localities, such as Jimbolia, Lenauheim or other Swabian communes, on the estates of Count Johann von Buttler with whom they concluded leases. In honor of the tenant Johann, German peasants called the locality Johannisfeld ("John's field"). The colonists settled here quickly and, only two years after the construction of the first houses, they started the construction of the first school. Later, the colony became the property of the state, and the inhabitants were able, between 1865–1875, to buy back their properties from it. The Roman Catholic church was built in 1833.

Both Otelec and Iohanisfeld were severely affected by the floods of April–May 2005, with most of the built-up areas being covered for months by the overflowing waters of the Timiș River. About two-thirds of the households were totally or partially destroyed. The houses were rebuilt following the reconstruction program coordinated and financed by the Romanian Government. Also, during 2006, from budgetary funds and from aid from the country or abroad, most of the public buildings (kindergarten, school, dispensary, community center, etc.) were rehabilitated or rebuilt.

== Demographics ==
Ethnic composition (2021)
1. Romanians (67.8%)
2. Hungarians (25.9%)
3. Unknown (5.67%)
4. Others (0.67%)
Religious composition (2021)
1. Orthodox (56.9%)
2. Roman Catholics (30.9%)
3. Pentecostals (2.89%)
4. Jehovah's Witnesses (1.32%)
5. Unknown (5.73%)
6. Others (2.20%)

Otelec had a population of 1,657 inhabitants at the 2011 census, up 10.54% from the 2011 census. Most inhabitants are Romanians (67.77%), with a minority of Hungarians (25.89%). For 5.67% of the population, ethnicity is unknown. By religion, most inhabitants are Orthodox (56.91%), but there are also minorities of Roman Catholics (30.95%), Pentecostals (2.89%) and Jehovah's Witnesses (1.32%). For 5.73% of the population, religious affiliation is unknown.

Census		Ethnic composition
Year	Population	Romanians	Hungarians	Germans	Serbs
1880	2,745	–	965	1,756	19
1890	3,434	7	1,524	1,881	19
1900	3,528	–	1,644	1,843	26
1910	3,631	18	1,969	1,605	34
1920	3,550	17	1,893	1,607	–
1930	3,461	54	1,699	1,677	22
1941	3,377	129	1,543	1,643	–
1956	3,343	–	–	–	–
1966	2,786	327	1,395	1,048	7
1977	2,257	444	1,168	640	2
1992	1,637	825	765	43	4
2002	1,705	994	688	18	1
2011	1,499	858	567	12	3
2021	1,657	1,123	429	4	–

== Politics and administration ==
The commune of Otelec is administered by a mayor and a local council composed of 11 councilors. The mayor, Simona-Silvia Fechete, from the National Liberal Party, has been in office since 2020. As from the 2024 local elections, the local council has the following composition by political parties:

Party	Seats	Composition
National Liberal Party	7	
Democratic Alliance of Hungarians in Romania	2	
Save Romania Union	2	
