= Flag of Timișoara =

The historical flag of Timișoara

Although Timișoara does not have an official flag, historically it has been represented by a white cross on a red field. Identical to the flag of Savoy, it was used by Prince Eugene of Savoy, who liberated Timișoara from the Turks in 1716. The flag is also featured on the coat of arms of the city. Today, this flag is not hoisted on the city's public buildings, and Romanian law prevents local flags from containing symbols of other states.

Another unofficial flag, hoisted in some places in the city, including in front of the Metropolitan Cathedral, is the coat of arms of Timișoara on a white field.
