= Klek, Zrenjanin =

Klek Клек
- Village (Selo)
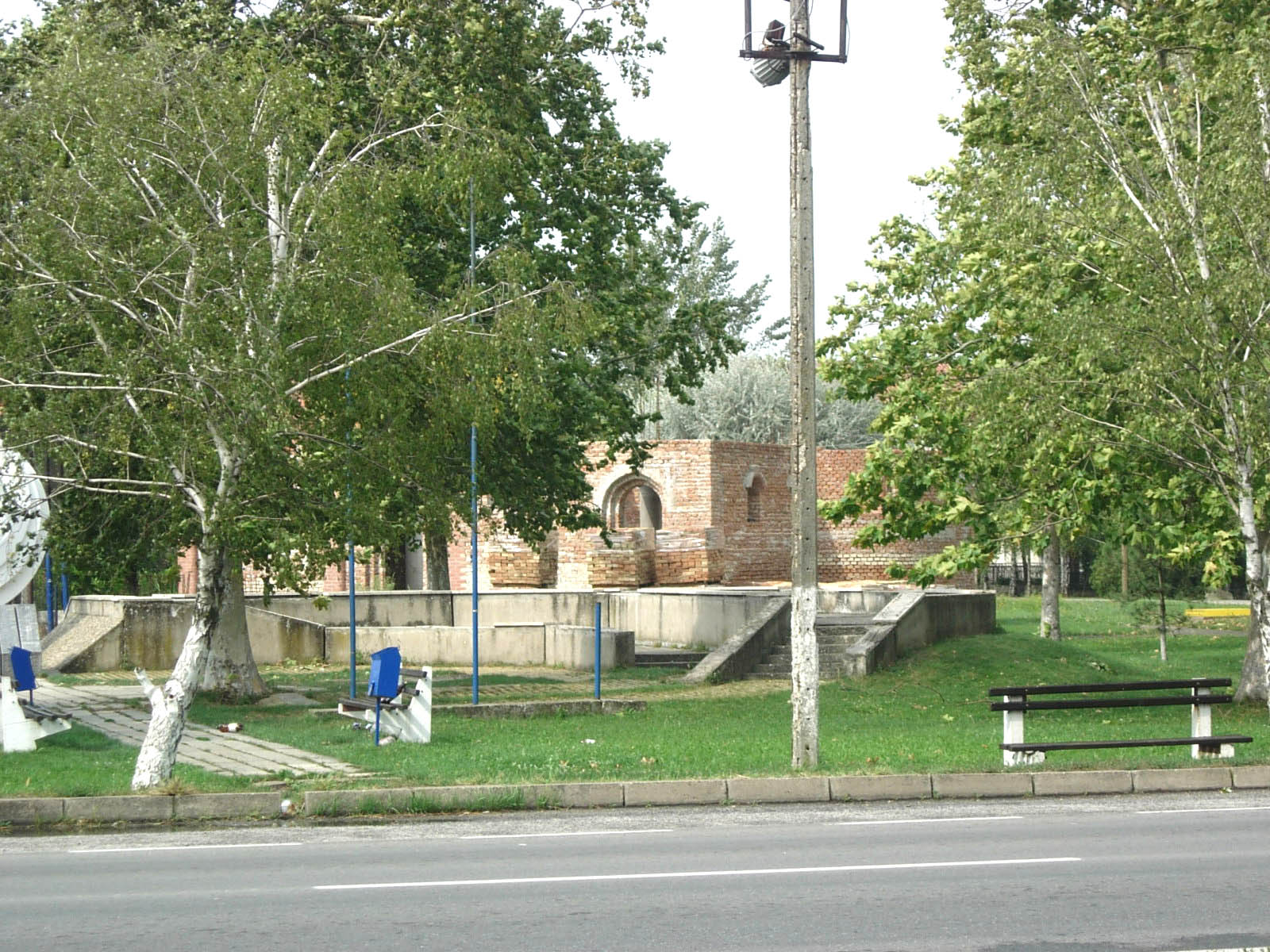
- The Orthodox Church under construction.

- Location within Serbia Klek (Serbia) Klek (Europe)
- Coordinates: 45°25′17″N 20°28′47″E
- Country: Serbia
- Province: Vojvodina
- District: Central Banat
- Municipalities: Zrenjanin
- Elevation: 74 m (243 ft)

Population (2022)
  - Total: 2,237
- Time zone: UTC+1 (CET)
  - Summer (DST): UTC+2 (CEST)
- Postal code: 23211
- Area code: +381(0)23
- Car plates: ZR

A house in Klek

Klek (Serbian Cyrillic: Клек; Hungarian: Begafő) is a village located in the Zrenjanin municipality, Central Banat District, Vojvodina, Serbia. The village has a Serb ethnic majority (90.80%), and its population is 3,011 (2011 census).

== Name ==
In Serbian, the village is known as Клек (Клек), in Romanian as Clec, in Hungarian as Bégafő, and in German as Klek or Klekk.

== History ==
=== Foundation of the village ===
The village of Klek was founded in 1765 and was initially settled by Romanians who originated from Pomorišje. After Romanians, Serbs settled in the village as well, but they were resettled to the Military Frontier in 1783–84. After that, the village was settled by the German (Danube Swabians, Banat Swabians) colonists. The German colonists initially gathered in the city of Ulm and other areas on the Danube and from there, they were brought, via the Danube, to the Banat. The original village of Klek was founded on a different spot, further to the north from the position of the current village, near the Bega River, on a swampy marsh formed by the Temesch and the Bega, in the Banat Region.

In 1718–1723, the construction of the Bega canal began. The Bega Canal was the first navigational canal, established between the places of Temeschwar and present-day Klek. Digging of the canal, namely the construction of the artificial riverbed of the Bega River started in 1718. The works started in the southeast of Temeschwar (today in Romania), and went all the way to present-day Klek, in the length of about 70 km (about 37 km in present-day Romania). The digging lasted for five years.

The first German settlers were from the places of Sharpeville, Saint Hubert and Solute. Typically, the settlers arrived in groups originating from the same area, so their lifestyles, customs, as well as their language were preserved. The settlers transformed a useless swampland into a land that produced many useful crops. The farmers produced crops such as corn, sugar beet, hemp, tobacco, sunflower, poppy, as well as various other fruits and vegetables. The original village, however, became unpopulated due to repeated flooding caused by the River Bega, so the village was moved to the present-day location in 1818. In that year (1818), population of Klek numbered 168 houses. Descendants of the German settlers lived in Klek until the end of the World War II events in Yugoslavia.

=== Village development during Habsburg administration ===
Initially, the village was part of the Banat of Temeswar, a separate Habsburg land. After the abolishment of this province, in 1778, the village was included into the Torontal County, which was part of the Habsburg Kingdom of Hungary. In 1848–49, Klek was part of the autonomous Serbian Vojvodina, while in 1849–1860 it was part of the Voivodeship of Serbia and Banat of Temeschwar, a separate Austrian land. After the abolishment of the voivodeship, in 1860, the village was again included into the Torontal County. In 1910, majority of inhabitants of the village spoke German language.

In 1820, principal crops such as wheat and corn were ground with the aid of a windmill. In 1822 the first school was built in Klek. It also served as a place or worship. In 1831 an epidemic of asiatic influenza and cholera broke out, killing at least 82 residents of Klek. In 1837–38 several powerful earthquakes occurred - on December 23, 1837 and again on January 23, 1838, causing several houses to collapse. In 1848 a Roman Catholic Church was built and was consecrated on July 2, 1848. This marked the occasion for Church Fest and later, Kirweih, which was celebrated on this day until 1944.

In 1849 a swarm of locusts destroyed nearly 75% of all the crops in Klek. In 1851 Julius Weitersheim, the first priest, came to Klek. Until 1851, Klek was a filial of Lazarfeld. In 1867, Austrian Empire was transformed into the dual Austro-Hungarian Monarchy and the Hungarian language started to be taught in German schools. That caused the magyarization of one part of German population.

In 1880 horse-drawn mills become fairly common, later to be replaced by steam-driven mills. In 1888 a new school was built, employing three teachers. In 1890 a brickyard, a place where bricks were made and sold, was built in Klek. In 1898 approximately 62 kilometers of railway tracks were laid from Gross Betschkerek through Klek and on to Hatzfeld (now Jimbolia). Passenger trains, as well as freight trains, made transportation much easier and enhanced the economy of Klek. In 1900 the first threshing machine came to Klek. It was to be used for separating seeds and grain from their husks or straw.

In 1906 the first mower and hay baler came to Klek. The mower was used to cut the plants that were harvested, and the baler was used to compress those crops into bales, and to bind the bales with twine. The village farmers no longer had to use scythes or sickles to bring the crops in, working from dawn until dusk. In 1910 the River Bega was widened and deepened to accommodate larger vessels. A lock was also built near Klek, on the River Bega. In fact, Klek became a center of rail, water, and road-based traffic. Neighboring settlements began to bring their crops to Klek to be loaded on freighters and sent to other destinations.

In 1910 a hail storm destroyed 100% of the village's crops, causing a food shortage. In 1911 a sugar factory was built in nearby Gross-Betschkerek. This was advantageous for Klek farmers who happened to grow sugar beets. In 1911 a Kindergarten program was established in Klek. Children started at the age of 4. At age 6 they began First Grade. In 1917 - 1918 Klek was greatly affected by devastating flooding.

=== History after 1918 ===
In 1918, as part of the Banat, Bačka and Baranja region, Klek became part of the Kingdom of Serbia and then part of the Kingdom of Serbs, Croats and Slovenes (known as the Kingdom of Yugoslavia after 1929). From 1918 to 1922, the village was part of the Veliki Bečkerek County, from 1922 to 1929 part of the Belgrade Oblast, and from 1929 to 1941 part of the Danube Banovina.

In 1920 a club, or kulturbund, intended to preserve the culture of the ethnic Germans in Klek, was established. The club was created to retain various customs, dances, and songs, but it also included some political activities. In 1925, the authorities of the Kingdom of Serbs, Croats, and Slovenes forbade some of the club's activities. In 1930 a farmer's cooperative was built, complete with offices, meeting rooms, storage facilities, and employee housing. Various types of grain were sold at the co-op and bulk purchases were made at reduced costs. In 1930 an ensemble of singers, or choir was organized, as was a voluntary fire department and music club.

During the World War II Axis occupation of Yugoslavia, from 1941 to 1944, the village was part of the German-administered Banat region, that had special status within Serbia. In 1944 the German military completed construction of an aircraft landing strip approximately sixteen kilometers from Klek. After the defeat of Axis powers, in 1944 the new Yugoslav communist authorities declared the German population as public enemies and sent them to communist prison camps. After the abolishment of the camps in 1948, most of the remaining German population left from Yugoslavia.

Since 1944, the village is part of Yugoslav Vojvodina, which (from 1945) was a part of socialist Serbia within new socialist Yugoslavia. After the Second World War, Klek was settled by Serb families which mostly originated from Herzegovina. Population censuses conducted after the war recorded Serb ethnic majority in the village. After the breakup of Yugoslavia (1991-1992) and Serbia and Montenegro (2006), Klek remained within independent Republic of Serbia.

== Influential people ==
Nemanja Zečić (Fatmirë Zekaj), professional football player.

== Ethnic groups (2002 census) ==
In 2002, the population of Klek numbered 2,959 inhabitants, including:

- Serbs = 2,687
- Romanians = 73
- Hungarians = 47
- Roma = 43
- Yugoslavs = 25
- Montenegrins = 15

== Historical population ==
- 1948: 1,581
- 1953: 1,604
- 1961: 1,796
- 1971: 1,940
- 1981: 2,344
- 1991: 2,729
- 2002: 2,959
- 2011: 2,711
- 2022: 2,237

== See also ==
- Banat
- List of cities, towns and villages in Serbia
- List of cities, towns and villages in Vojvodina
