= Timișoara Hydroelectric Plant =

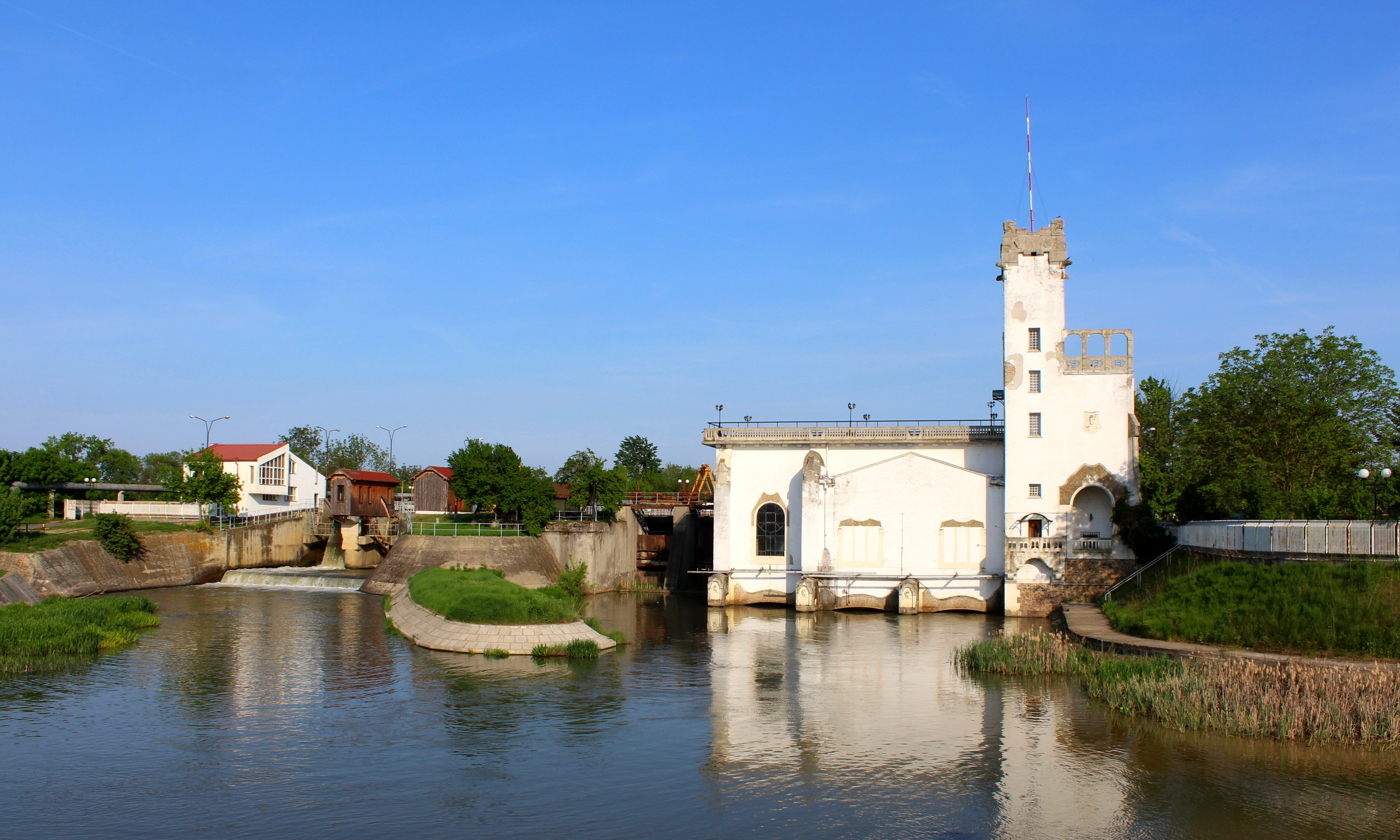
- Location: Timișoara, Romania
- Coordinates: 45°45′29″N 21°15′55″E
- Status: Operational
- Construction began: 1909
- Commission date: 3 May 1910
- Owner: Colterm SA

The Timișoara Hydroelectric Plant is one of the first hydroelectric power plants built in Europe and the oldest on the continent still operating. It is a historical monument located on the territory of Timișoara, with the LMI code TM-II-m-A-06094.

== History ==
Construction of the hydroelectric power plant started in 1909, and it became operational on 3 May 1910, supplying 89% of the electricity consumption in Timișoara with a production of 4.132 GW.

Emil Szilárd, the city's chief engineer at the time, constructed the first dam-type hydroelectric power plant with horizontal-axis turbines in what is now Romania. In an article published in the Hungarian Technicians' Magazine in the early 20th century, architect Mihály Seinder stated, "the Timișoara Hydroelectric Power Plant is the most successful hydroelectric power plant built in Hungary, both technically and economically." This construction on the regulated Bega riverbed addressed two key issues: eliminating dampness in basements and preventing flooding in the Fabric neighborhood. The plant was equipped with three Ganz Villamossági Rt. turbines, which were manufactured in Budapest.

To construct the hydroelectric power plant, the municipality repurchased water usage rights from several private owners, including the Jovin mill, tobacco mill, and the Prohászka, Gyürky, and Gold mills. They also acquired the old wood warehouse and carried out several other smaller expropriations. The City Hall obtained the favorable opinion of the Minister of Agriculture in Budapest to promote the project. The Ganz Group, which produced the turbines, had extensive experience with power plants built worldwide. The largest of these was the Tivoli hydroelectric power plant, which supplied electricity to the Italian capital.

The first director of the plant, Henrik Billing, introduced numerous improvements to the hydroelectric power plant's equipment, many of which were inventions and were frequently featured in technical literature for specialists. During World War I, Timișoara was less affected by coal shortages, thanks to the electricity provided by the Bega hydroelectric power plant.

Following World War I, Timișoara and two-thirds of the historical Banat were incorporated into Greater Romania. After the nationalization of major means of production in 1948, the hydroelectric power plant came under the control of various ministries. It returned to the city's ownership after 1990.

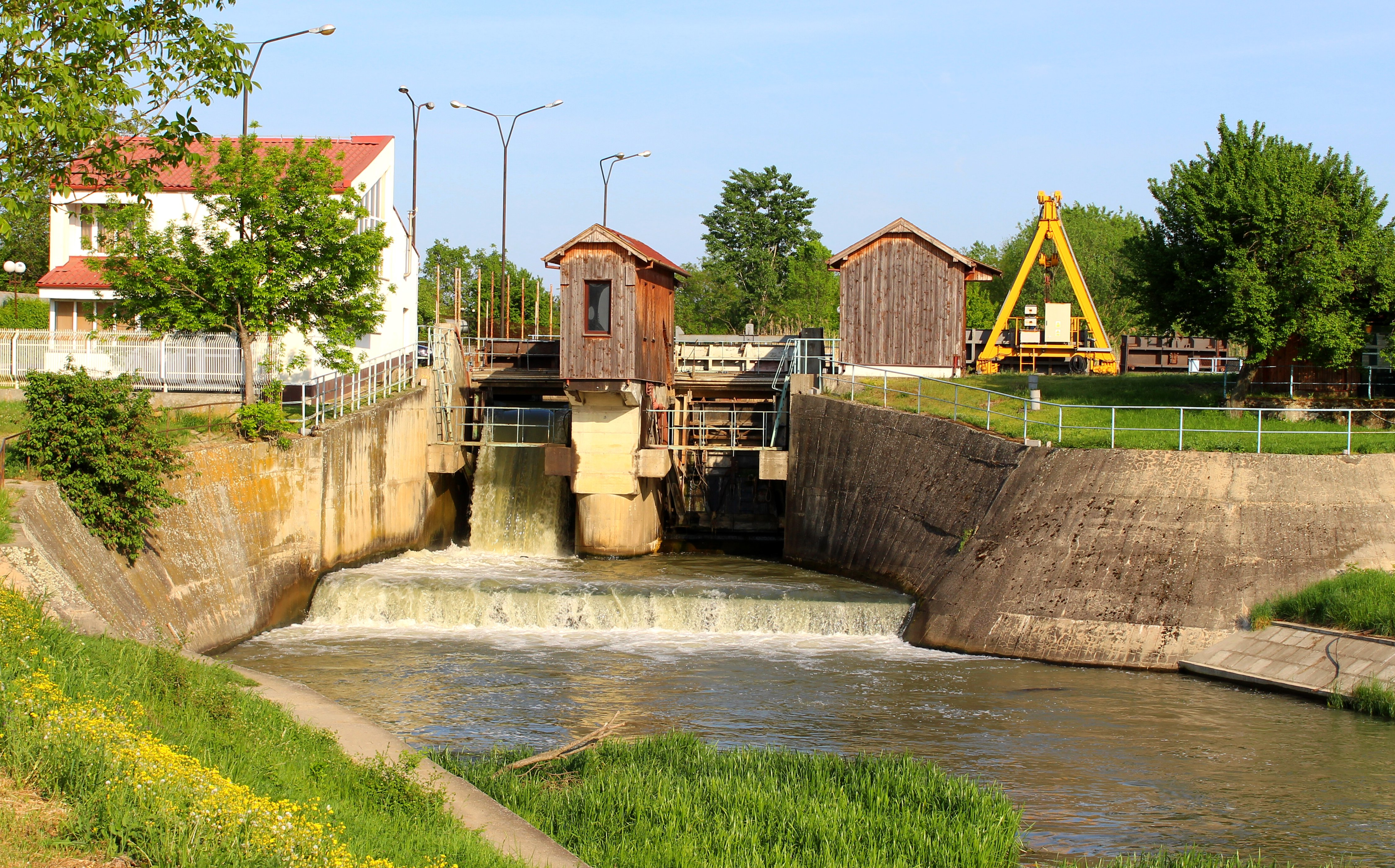
The sluice

Over the years, only minimal technical maintenance was needed. The first repair occurred in 1930, and in 1954, the original German-made electrical control panel was replaced with Soviet equipment. Since then, the engine room has undergone renovations, and the structure containing the dam operation mechanisms has been restored to its original design.

For nearly 50 years, the Popular Bath and Beach operated behind the complex where the reservoir was constructed.

== Architecture ==
The power plant complex was designed by the renowned chief architect of early 20th-century Timișoara, László Székely. The tower, resembling a medieval keep and intended for administrative use, features the city's coat of arms on its facade. It also has a balcony at its base, with arched windows on the downstream facade. A wooden walkway with decorative elements runs above the power plant locks.
