= Jankov Most =

Jankov Most Јанков Мост (Serbian) Iancăid (Romanian)
- Village (Selo)
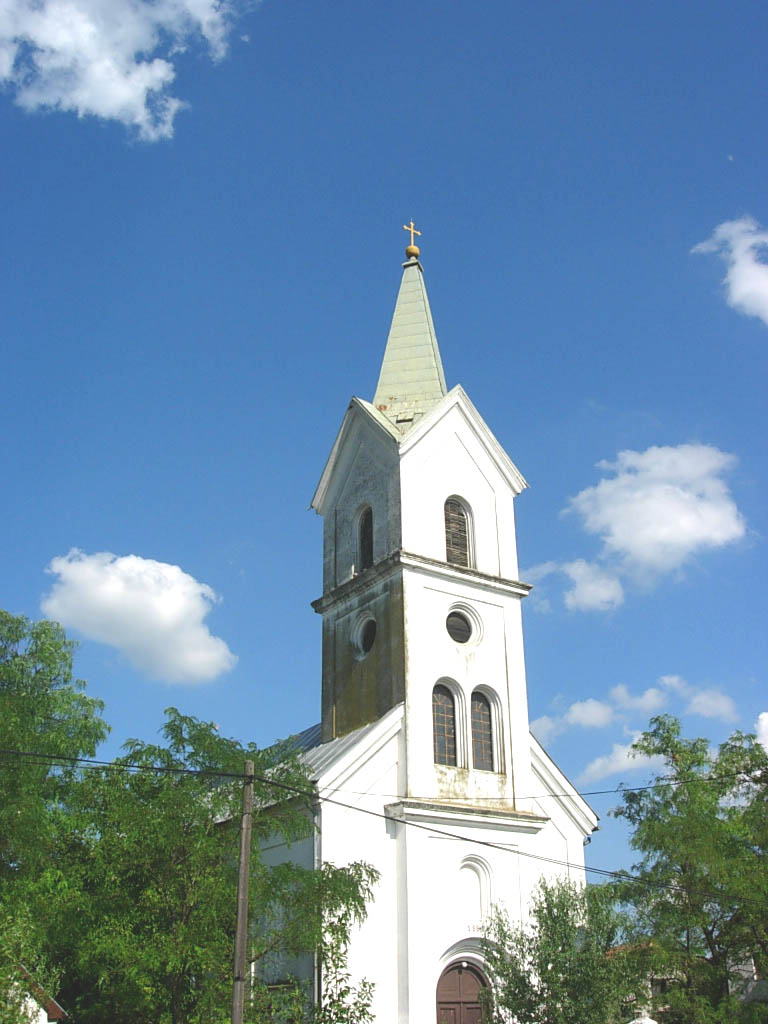
- The Romanian Orthodox Church

- Location within Serbia Jankov Most (Serbia) Jankov Most (Europe)
- Coordinates: 45°28′16″N 20°26′10″E
- Country: Serbia
- Province: Vojvodina
- District: Central Banat
- Municipalities: Zrenjanin
- Elevation: 58 m (190 ft)

Population (2022)
  - Total: 388
- Time zone: UTC+1 (CET)
  - Summer (DST): UTC+2 (CEST)
- Postal code: 23201
- Area code: +381(0)23
- Car plates: ZR

Jankov Most (Serbian Cyrillic: Јанков Мост; Romanian: Iancăid; Hungarian: Jankahíd) is a village located in the administrative area of the City of Zrenjanin, Central Banat District, Vojvodina, Serbia. The village has a population of 388 people (2022 census).

== History ==
The first time mentioned as Iancahid in 1221. This name translates from Hungarian to Serbian as Jankov Most. Banatian historic Feliks Mileker from Vršac wrote that Dezideriu, bishop of Cenada, left Itebejs Parish and he traveled throughout Iancahid. Jankov Most is one of the oldest settlements in Zrenjanin municipal. In written sources from 14th century, it was known as "Passin Jankait". In 1660., it was mentioned that 3 settlements of Romanians and Orthodox Serbs are in this area: Jancait, Multvelin i Pessin Jancait. Later, in 18th century, the village is called "Nagy Jankahid" (Big Jankov Most) and "Kiss Jankahid" (Small Jankov Most). In 1747. the village was colonized by Romanians from Máramaros County. They came from village Bešenova, and one of proofs of this is that most of inhabitants in Iancahid have surname Besu. The village was property of many landlords through the last centuries. In the year 1781. village and pasture near was bought by count Lazar Lukač, who bought village Ečka also. 1838. village becomes property of Lazar Žigmond, and after that count Hernonkur.

== Demographics ==
=== Historical population ===
- 1961: 1,057
- 1971: 977
- 1981: 841
- 1991: 752
- 2002: 636
- 2011: 530
- 2022: 388

=== Ethnic groups ===
According to data from the 2022 census, ethnic groups in the village include:

- 176 (45.3%) Romanians
- 127 (32.7%) Serbs
- 38 (9.8%) Roma
- Others/Undeclared/Unknown

== Historical population ==
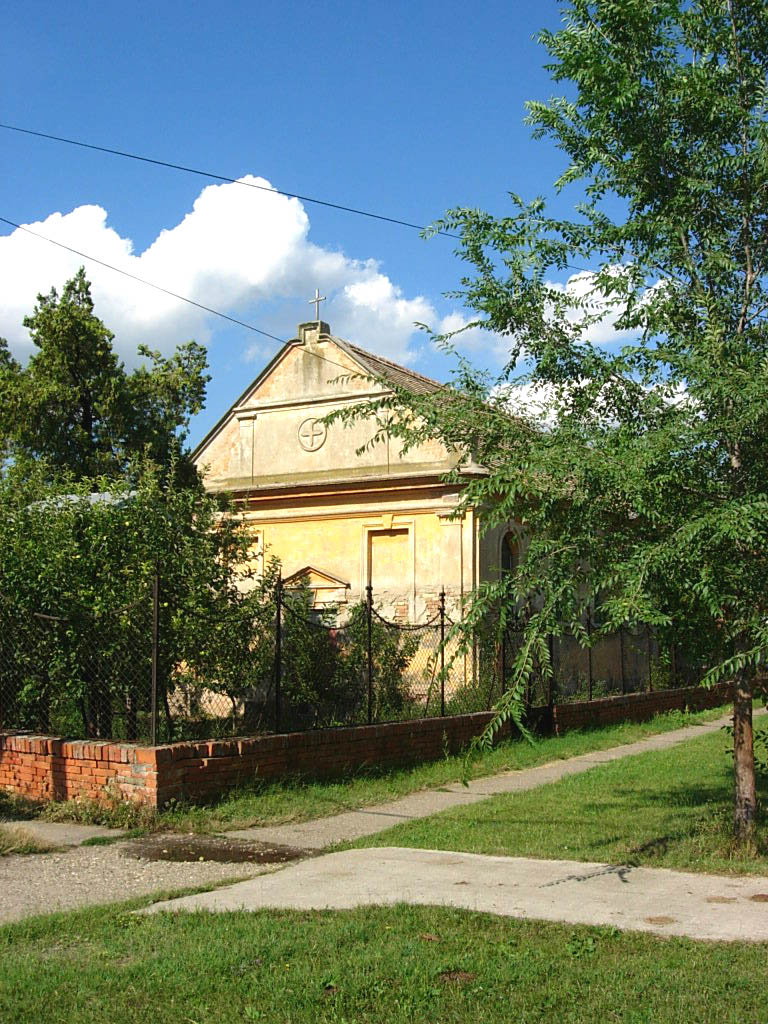
The Greek Catholic chapel.

== See also ==
- List of places in Serbia
- List of cities, towns and villages in Vojvodina
