= Electroputere V54 =

V951 Festival EP V54
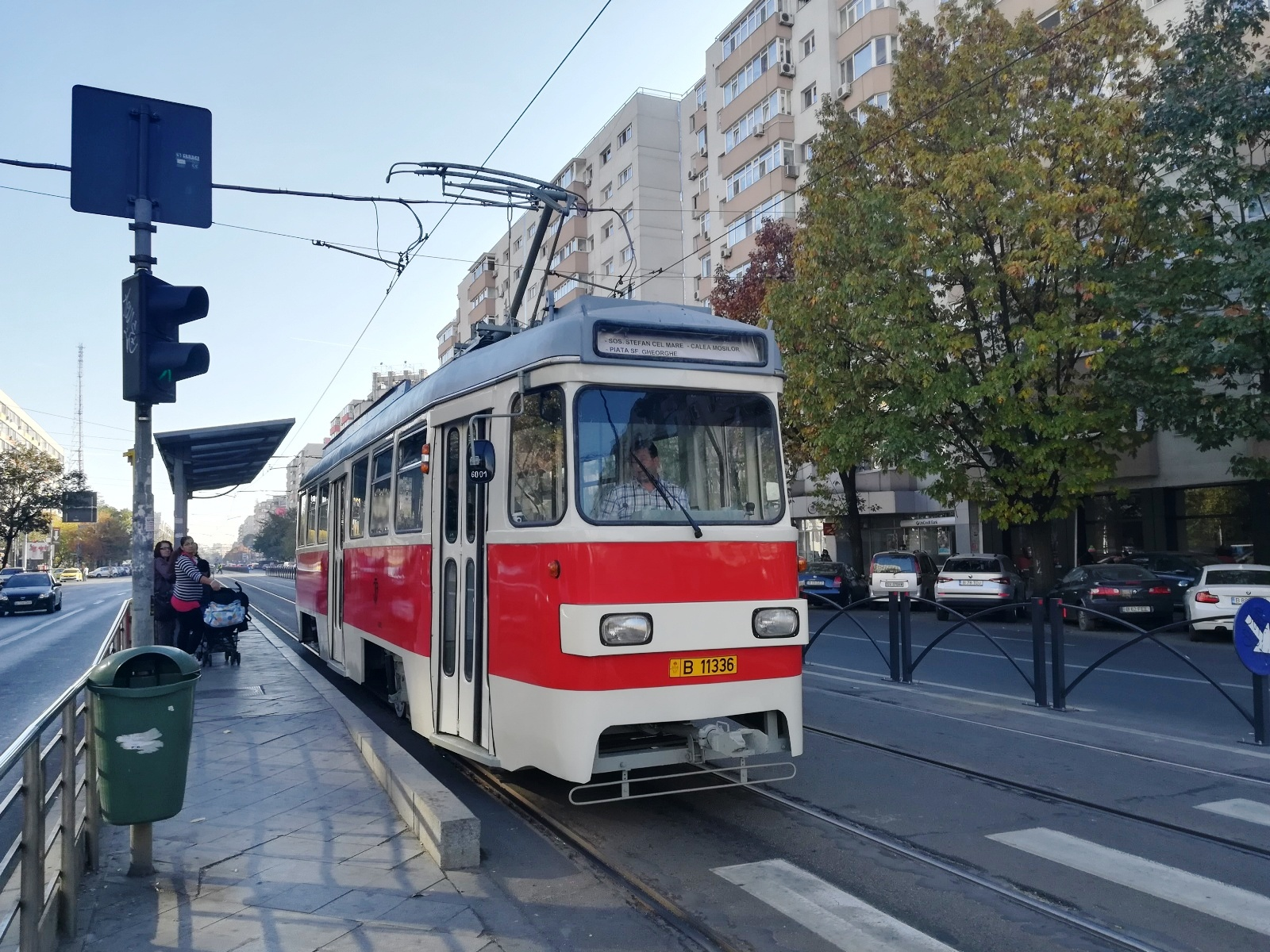
- Electroputere/V3A tram number 6001, made 1976, seen in 2018 on a historical run

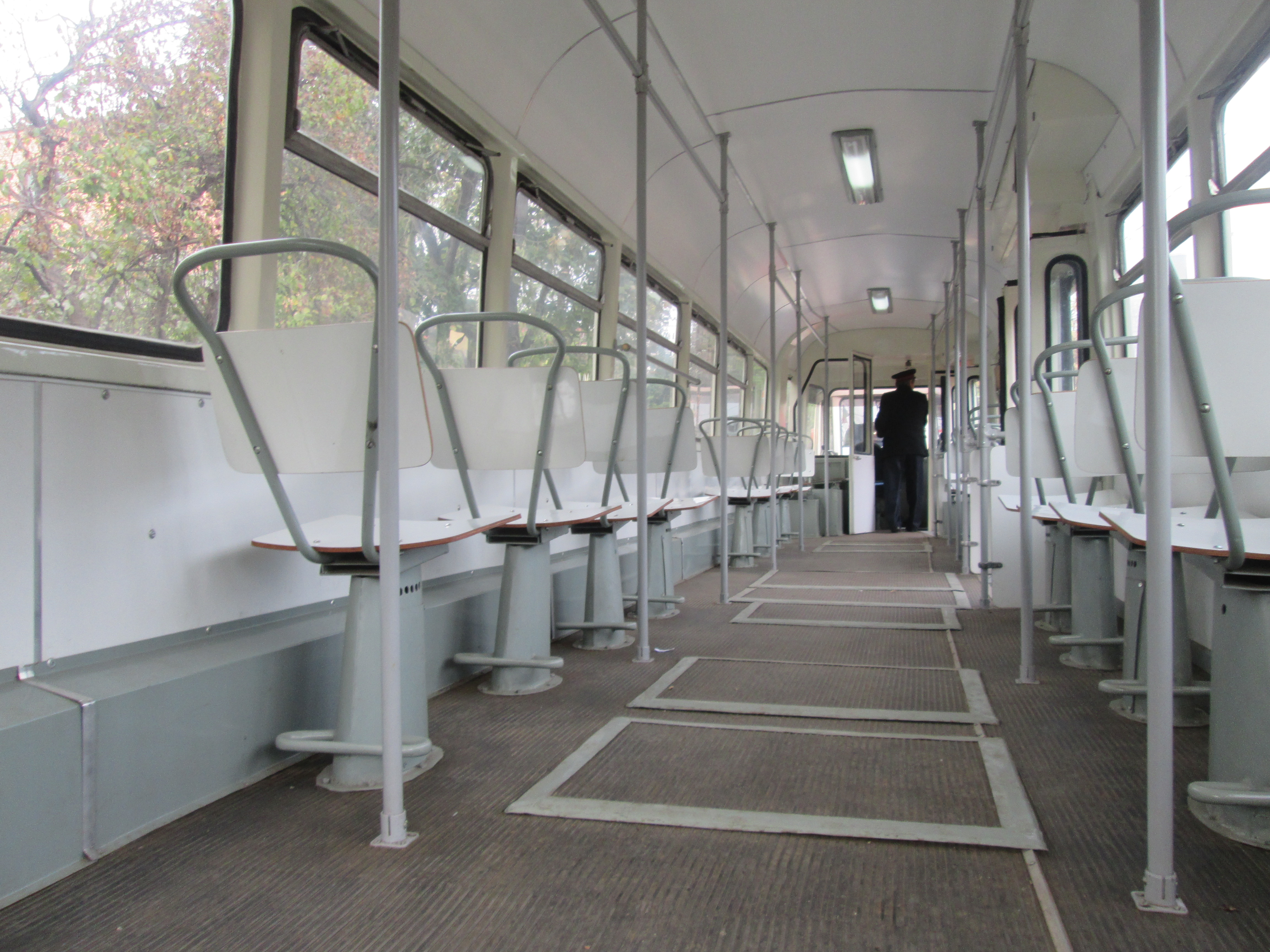
- In service: 1951–1984 (Bucharest); 1955–1989 (Oradea and Timișoara); 1976–2000 (for EP/V3A)
- Manufacturers: Electroputere Craiova (for EP V54); URAC Bucharest (for V951 and EP/V3A)
- Constructed: 1951–1953 (V951); 1955–1959 (V54)
- Refurbished: 1976–1982 (V951 and V54 transformed into EP/V3A by ITB)
- Scrapped: 1995, 1999–2000 (EP/V3A)
- Number preserved: 2 (1 V54 in Timișoara, 1 EP/V3A in Bucharest)
- Capacity: 22 (seated), 131 maximum
- Operators: ITB/RATB Bucharest; ITT Timișoara/IJTL Timiș; ICO Oradea/IJTL Bihor

Specifications
- Train length: 14,805 mm (48 ft 7 in)
- Car length: 14,200 mm (46 ft 7 in)
- Width: 2,292 mm (7 ft 6 in)
- Height: 3,120 mm (10 ft 3 in)
- Doors: 3
- Maximum speed: 67 km/h (42 mph)
- Weight: 18,000 kg (40,000 lb)
- Traction motors: 4
- Power output: 4 x 36 kW
- HVAC: heating: yes ventilation: hopper windows
- Electric systems: 600 V DC; 750 V DC (only for Bucharest)
- Current collection: pantograph
- UIC classification: B'B'
- Bogies: 2
- Track gauge: 1,435 mm

The Electroputere (EP) V54 was a tram series produced by Electroputere of Craiova, in the (then) People's Republic of Romania in the 1950s, with a total of 265 units built, excluding the 37 units of the earlier V951 Festival tramcars, produced by URAC Bucharest. Inspired by the PCC streetcar, the name comes from the Romanian "Vagon (din anul 19)54", translated to as "Tramcar model year 1954".

== History ==
=== V951 Festival ===
The construction of the V54 was largely derived from the V951 Festival trams. Built between 1951 and 1953, they were nicknamed "Festival" because of the 4th World Festival of Youth and Students that was taking place in Bucharest at the time of the delivery of these trams in 1953. These examples were built by the ITB's main workshops, URAC. The first 2 prototypes, numbered 3001 and 3002 were delivered on 21 December 1951, followed by 6 units in 1952 and another 30 in 1953, all of them being numbered 3001 to 3037. This was the second tram to be produced in communist-era Romania, and at the time was widely regarded as one of the most modern trams out there, compared to the V09 trams that had been introduced in around 1927.

The trams had axle-mounted motors that were operated in DC current, but couldn't operate in multiple traction. So in 1954 the tram number 3037 was sent to Electroputere in Craiova to be modified, the modifications leading to the prototype of the V54.

=== EP V54 ===
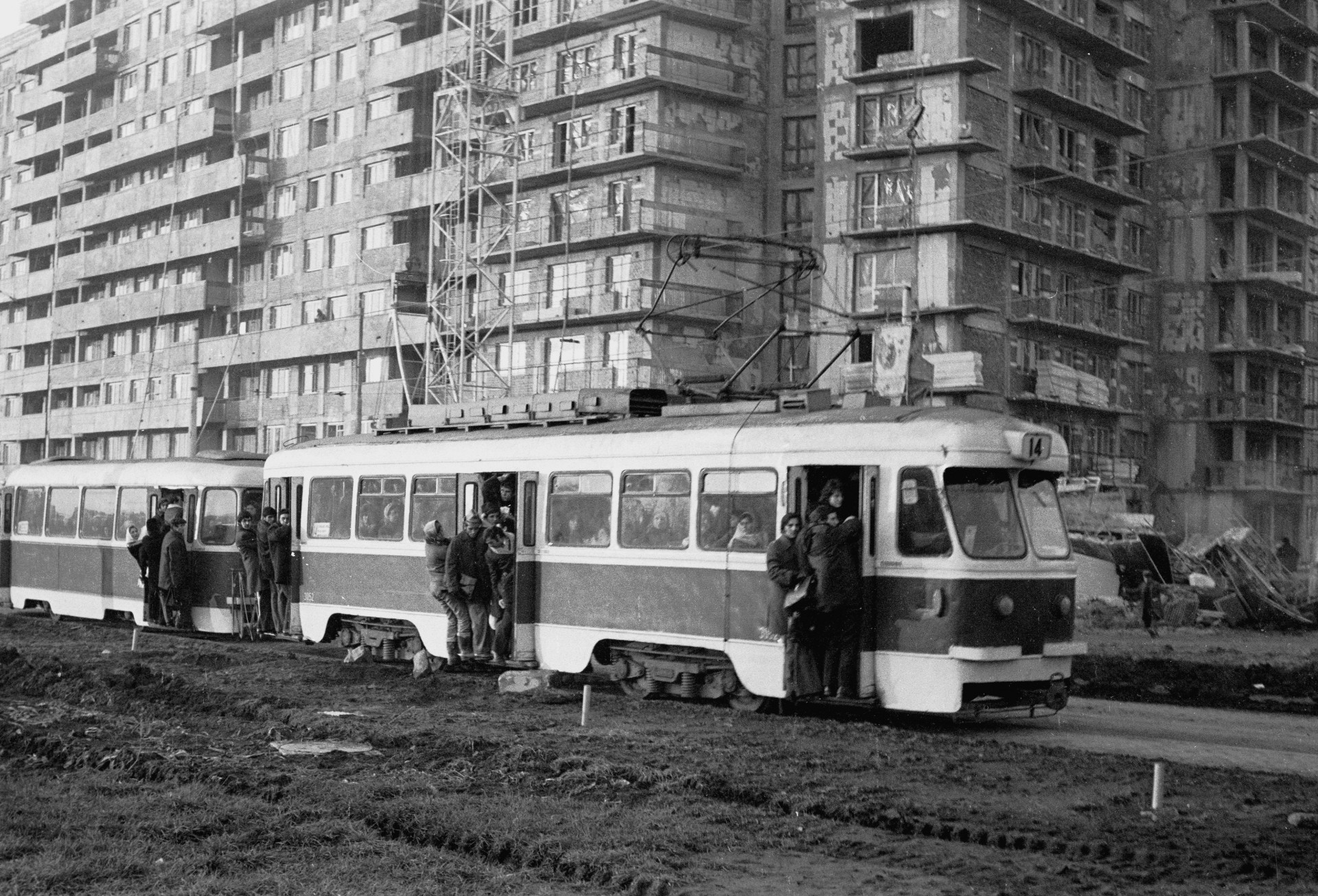
An overcrowded V54 is seen running on Pantelimon Avenue in Bucharest, 15 October 1975

After the modifications to tramcar 3037 paved the way for the V54, production started later and the first example was delivered on 8 January in 1955. As the tram was delivered in 3 cities, below is the separate history for all of them:

==== Bucharest ====
In Bucharest, the trams were numbered from 3038 to 3268, and delivered from 1955 to 1959, excluding the prototype 3037 that was made in 1953 as a V951 and modified in 1954 as a V54. Whilst 230 units were made, 106 of these units had to be delivered as V13 trailer cars, without electrical equipment. These were finally motorised between 1961 and 1965. These trailer cars were then in turn replaced by the V12 trailer cars made in 1964 and 1965, which counted 103 units in total. Apart from 3 "Festival"s and a V54 motorcar that were scrapped after burning down in a fire at the Victoria tram depot in 1968, the fleet kept serving until their modernization relatively unchanged.

The control gear of the EP trams was also used on various other service cars, such as the 1VU snow cleaners (built 1960-1982) and VMB-VRB ballast tippers built in two series (1964-1966 and 1983-1987). The second series used control gear recycled from modernized V54 motor cars that had been taken off from them after it was replaced with V3A control gear. However, during later refurbishments, the 1VU snow cleaners had their equipment replaced with those from scrapped EP/V3A motor cars, while the VMB-VRB ballast tippers were withdrawn from use in the 1990s.

===== Modernization into EP/V3A =====
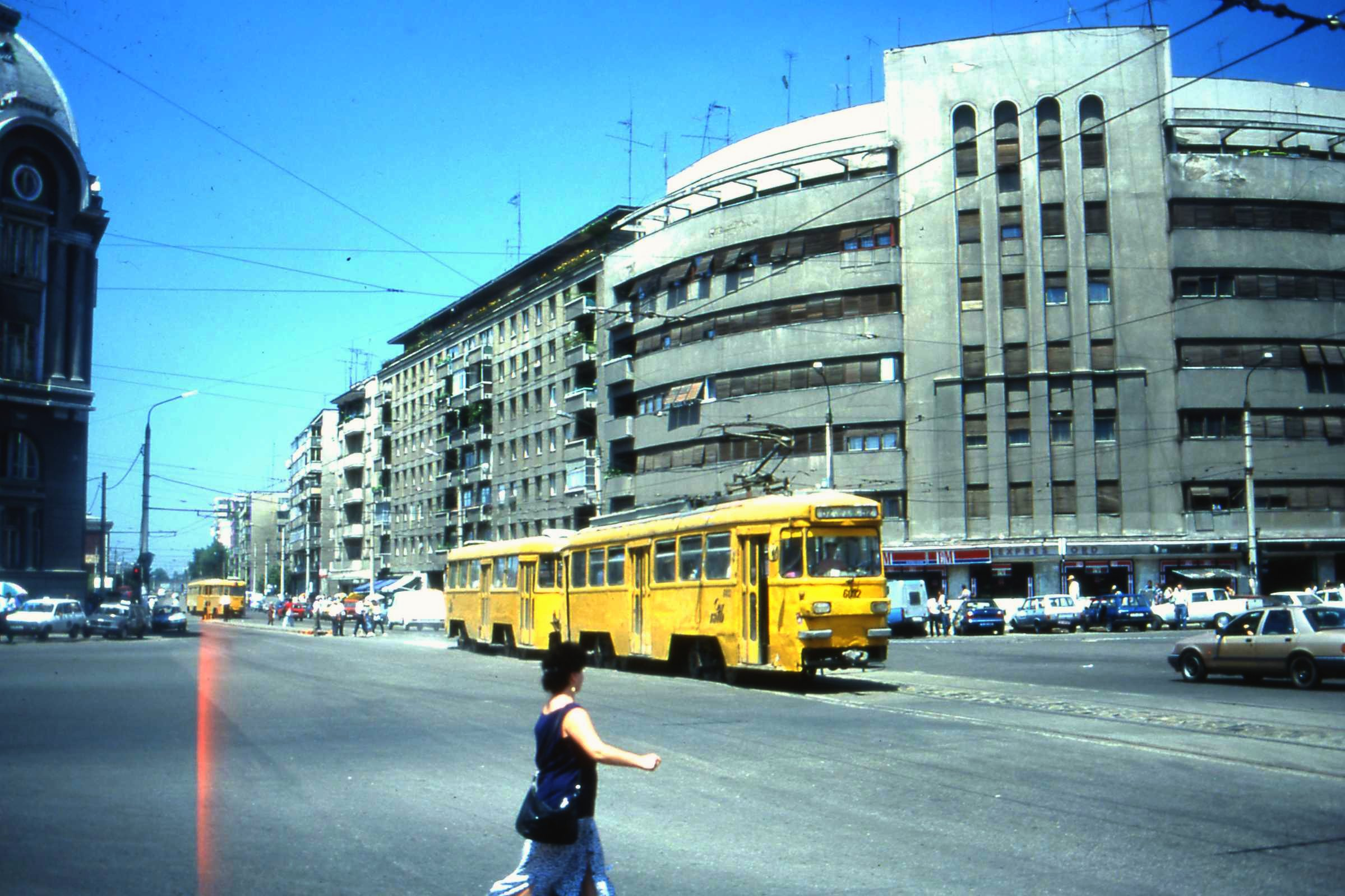
The 1978-modernised tram number 6032 is seen at Gara de Nord on the (defunct) line 52, in the 1990s RATB yellow livery in 1996

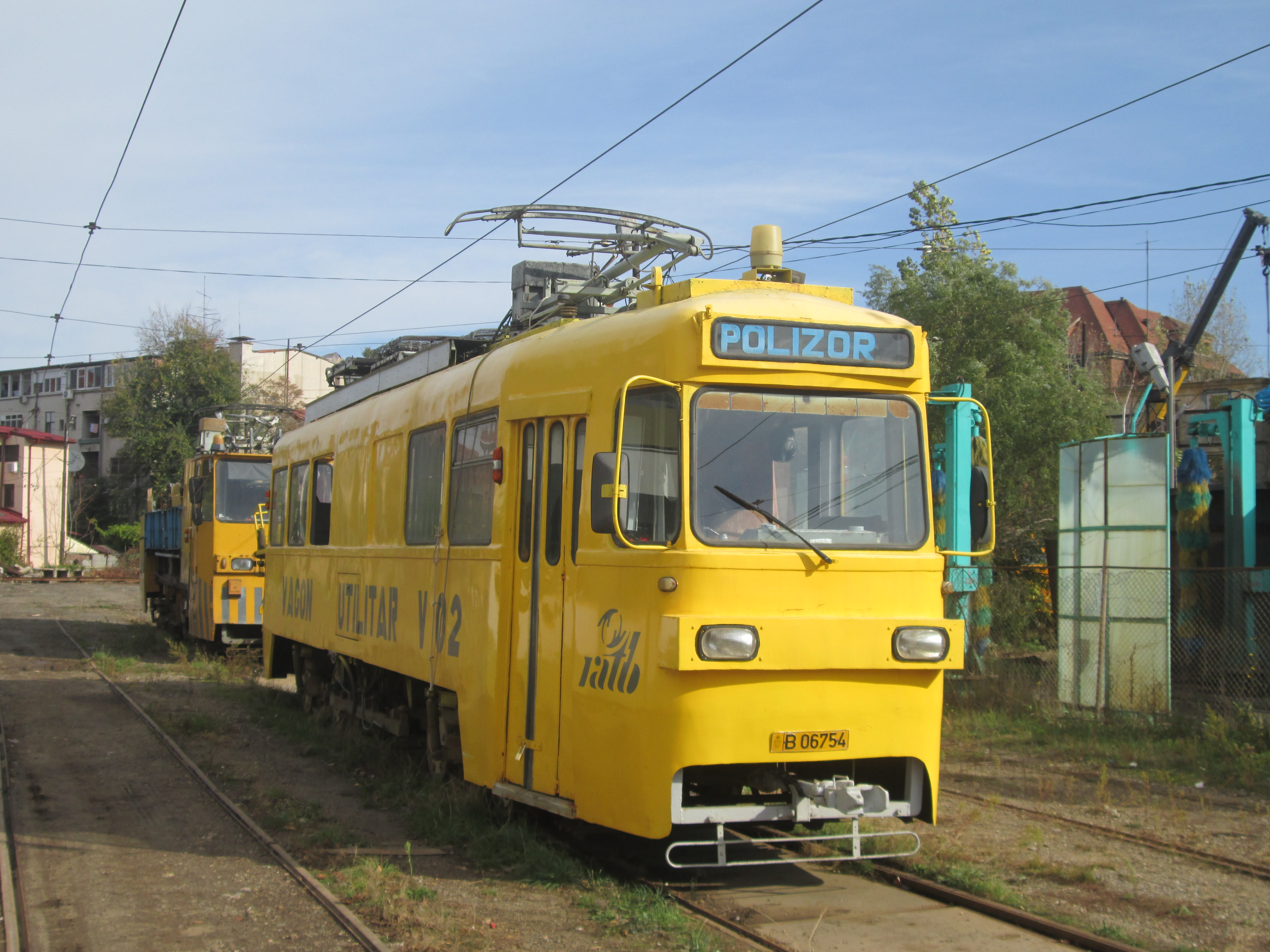
One of the EP/V3A service cars, this particular example is a track grinder

By 1976, the V54 tramcars were getting older and not complying with modern standards. Thus in the same year, a unit was modernized by the ITB main workshops, keeping the structure of the tram relatively similar, albeit slightly modernized but with the electrical part and bogies changed, using the equipment from the ITB V3A trams, that were introduced 5 years prior. This result lead to the new designation of EP/V3A, coming from Electroputere, the original manufacturer and V3A, the model the modernisation was based upon. Apart from the new bogies, the converted wagons could be recognized by the new one-piece pantographs (although some were applied to some units of the old V54 trams in the 1970s), the one-piece windshield, along with the new route indicator and the folding doors. Previously, they had two-part sliding doors, a two-part windscreen and a simple line number display.

year	modernised motor cars	modernized trailer cars	notes
1976:	6001	6201	
1977:	6002–6023	6202–6223	of which 12 Festival
1978:	6024–6043	6224–6243	of which 8 Festival
1979:	6044–6068	6244–6268	of which 2 Festival
1980:	6069–6093	6269–6286, 6288–6292	of which 11 Festival
1981:	6094–6162		of which 2 Festival.
1982:	6163–6172		

Above is the list of the trams modernized. Apart from the modernized trailer cars, ITB also made new trailer cars based on the design used on the V12 trailer cars and also transformed 2-axle trailer cars to 4-axle trailer cars (V14 or V12/V3A being the designation used for the trailer cars that were modernized).

1980:	6287
1981:	6294–6362
1982:	6363–6372

The trams served on most Bucharest tram routes, especially on the ones that were operated before by the non modernized versions. Initially the formation of this trams was simple, a motor car and a trailer car. But from 1988 and until 1992, there were also high capacity formations that were composed of one motor car and 2 trailer cars or 2 motor cars and a trailer car. Usually the middle motor car in the latter formation would have all its electrical equipment removed (temporarily) and act as a trailer car. These formations appeared in the late 1980s when "urban trains" were found on the Bucharest tram network to carry more passengers around. This practice was similar to the one done to V2A and V3A trams where these articulated sets would be coupled together forming 4 or 6 car tram sets.

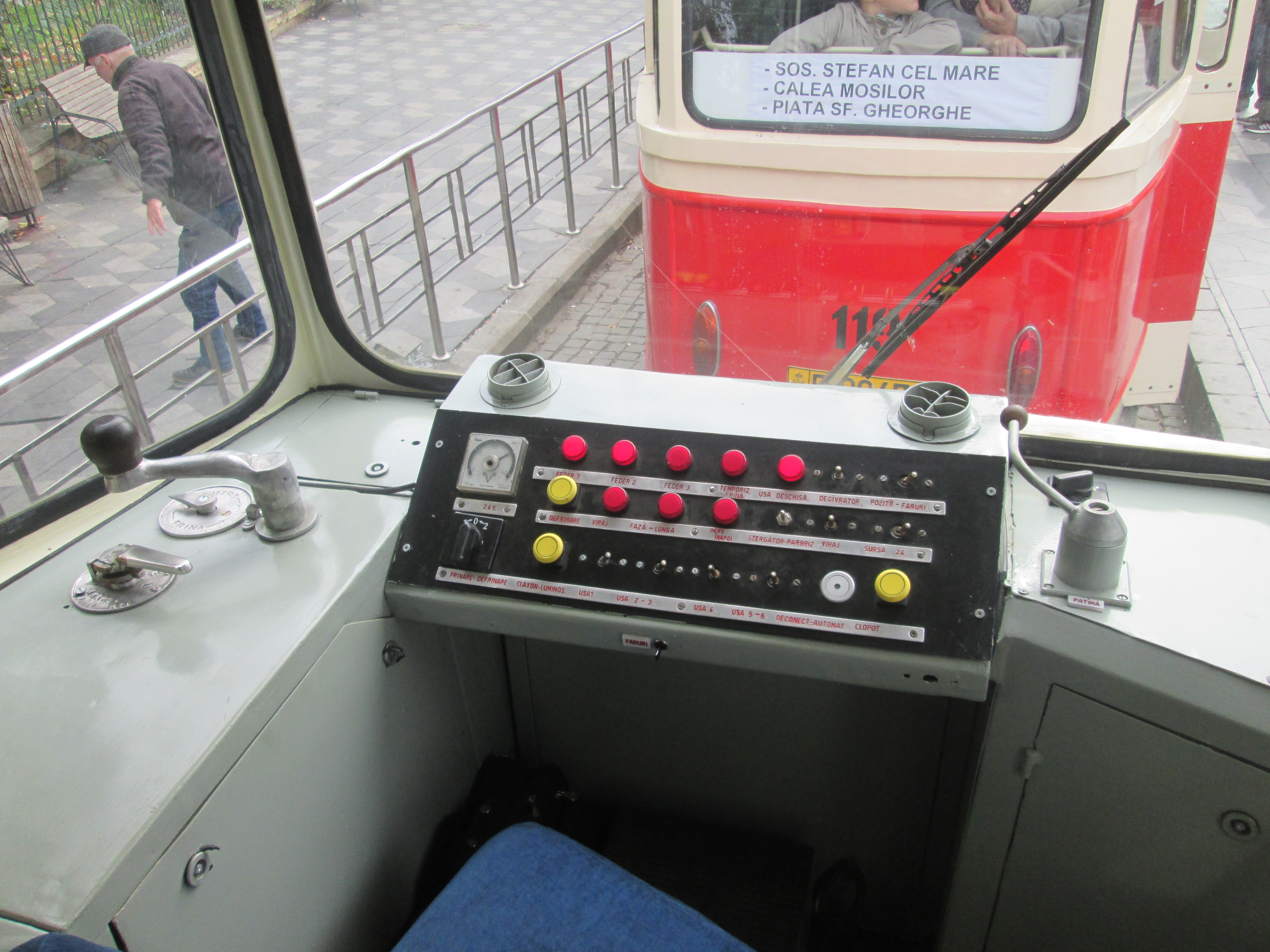
Drivers cab of EP/V3A unit 6001. It is identical to one of the V3A trams

The service was continued in the 1990s, but starting from 1995 these trams were retired in favour of the Duewag T4 trams brought from Frankfurt a.M. and the Rathgeber M4.65 and M5.65 trams brought from Munich. The last examples were retired by June 2000. Whilst most of these trams were scrapped, a number of them were then turned into service cars, and an example was sent to Timișoara in the hope of being restored (its whereabouts are unknown currently). In between 2012 and 2017, tram number 6001 that was stored along with 2 trailers was restored and now is preserved, operating as a museum tram.

==== Timișoara ====
There were 20 tramcars in Timișoara: being numbered like this:

- 1955: 5 units (208-212)
- 1956: 7 units (213-219)
- 1959: 8 units (220-227)

Note that the numbering from 201 to 207 was attributed to the Gb 2/2 tramcars that were built from 1948 to 1954 and from 229 onwards to the Timiș 2 trams that were built from 1969 to 1990. Trams 208 and 209 were renumbered to 228 and 229 in 1964, hence the confusion that there had been 22 cars instead of 20.

At first used as solo trams, between 1961 and 1966 the ITT received a few V12 trailer cars, and between 1965 and 1969 they were retrofitted with pneumatic doors. Because when they were introduced, Timișoara's tram system mostly relied on double-ended trams, they were only used on a single tram line (Line 2, later 1) and the circuit line 6. Later another ring line was established, meaning that they operated on 3 lines maximum during their existence. Between 1972 and 1976 they were phased out on the lines 1, 2 and 6 and replaced with the then-new Timiș 2 cars that were built locally, and then operated on a few other lines until the 1980s. Apart from tramcar number 229, that was used as a work car and retired in the 1990s, no example survives today. 229 was later restored in 2008 and now preserved as a museum car.

==== Oradea ====
Oradea received the least V54 trams, and were delivered as it follows:

- 1956: 44, 45, 46
- 1957: 47, 48
- 1958: 49, 50, 51
- 1959: 52, 53, 54 (motor cars) and 111, 112 and 113 (trailer cars)

The trailer cars were later transformed into motor cars in the early 1960s, and numbered 58, 59 and 60. Unlike other V54 trams that featured a diamond shaped pantograph, these featured a loop pantograph.

They operated either in solo formations or with ITB 2-axle trailer cars. Whilst by the beginning of the 1980s the 14 examples were still all running, along with the "imported" Timiș 2 trams and the ITB V56 and V58 trams, by the end of their operations only 5 were still in service. They were finally retired by 1989, to be replaced with the brand new ITB V2A and V3A sets. No example survives today.
