= 2005 European floods =

Natural disaster in central and eastern Europe

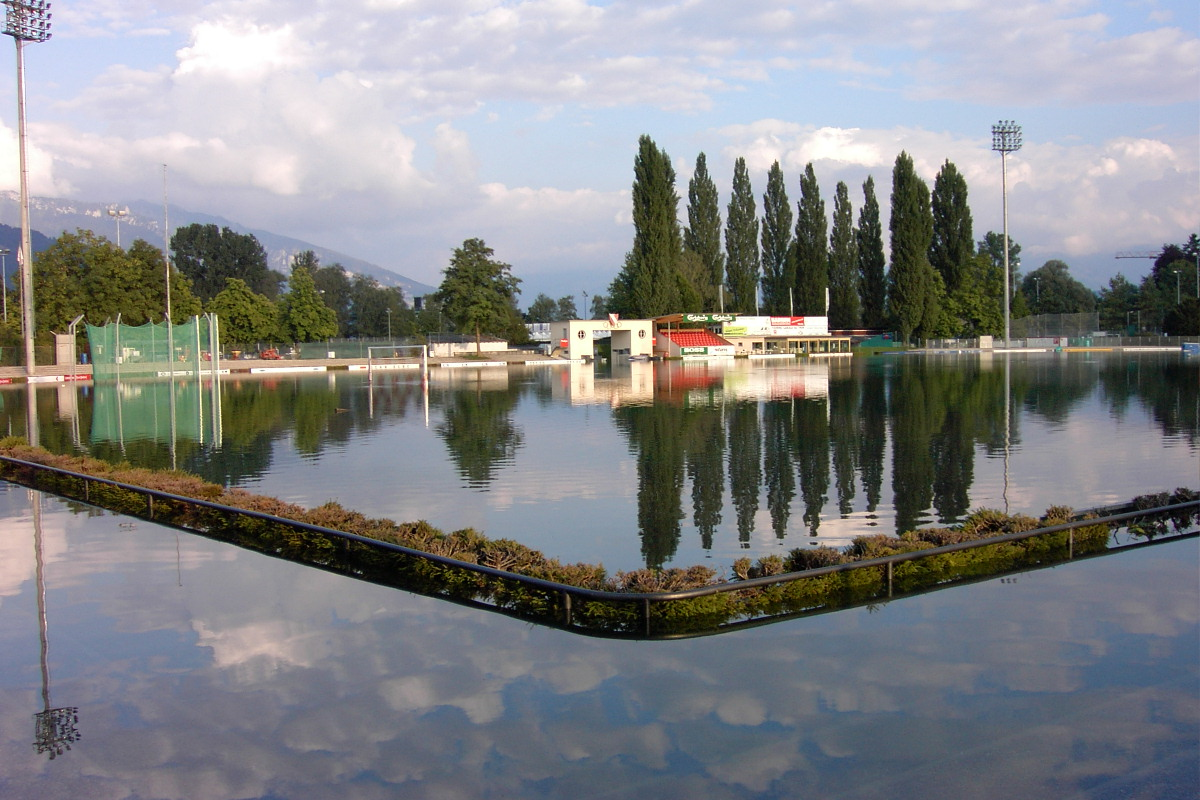
A stadium in Thun, Switzerland under water

The 2005 European floods hit mainly Romania, Switzerland, Austria and Germany, as well as several other countries in Central Europe and Eastern Europe during August 2005. The disaster came at a time when Portugal was suffering from intense forest fires which left 15 dead and days before the powerful Hurricane Katrina hit the United States.

== Death toll ==
The death toll was 62, with 31 dead in Romania, 20 in Bulgaria, 6 in Switzerland, and 5 in Austria and Germany. Thousands were evacuated from their homes; the rains were the worst flooding to hit Europe since the 2002 floods.

== Affected regions ==
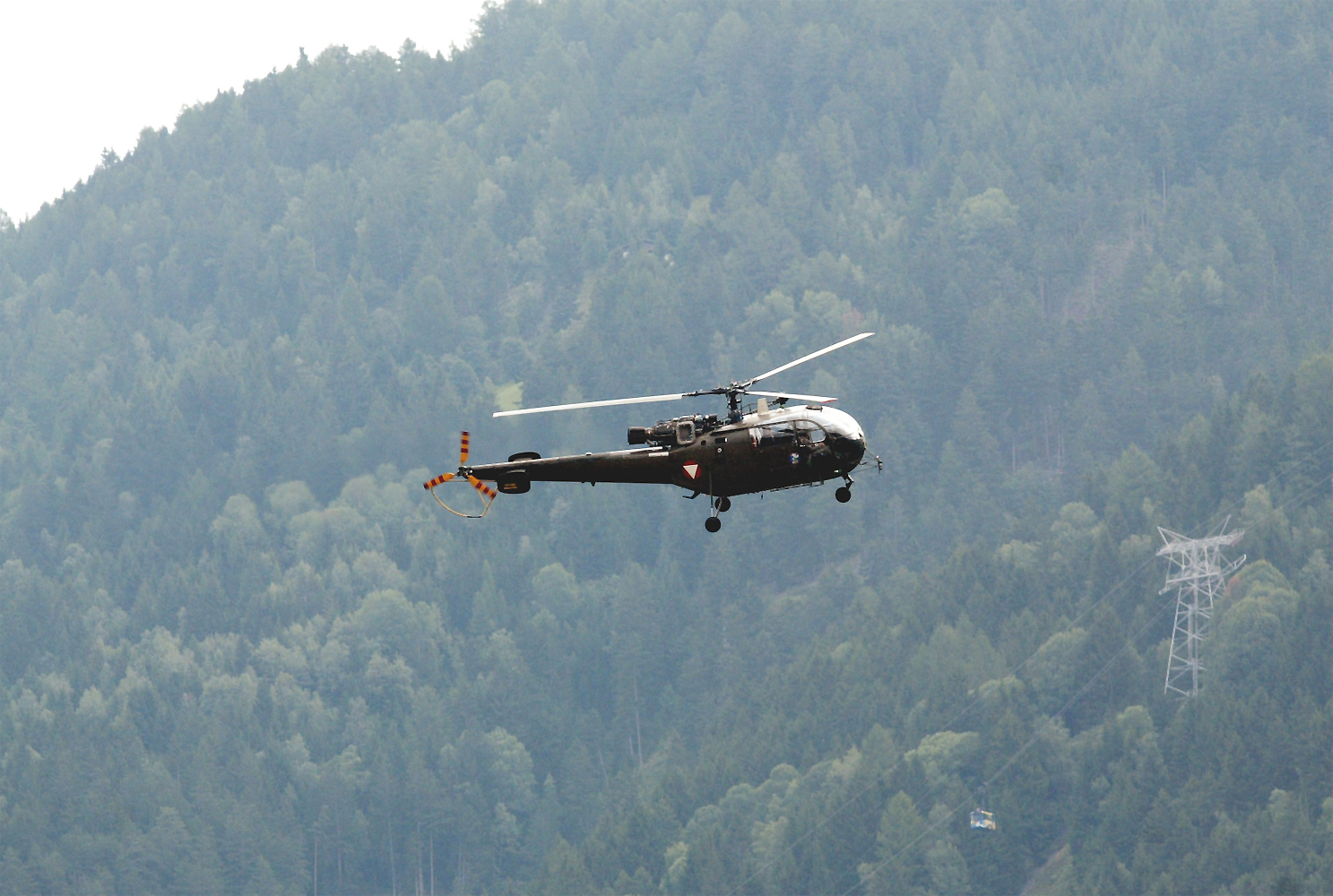
Rescue efforts with helicopters.

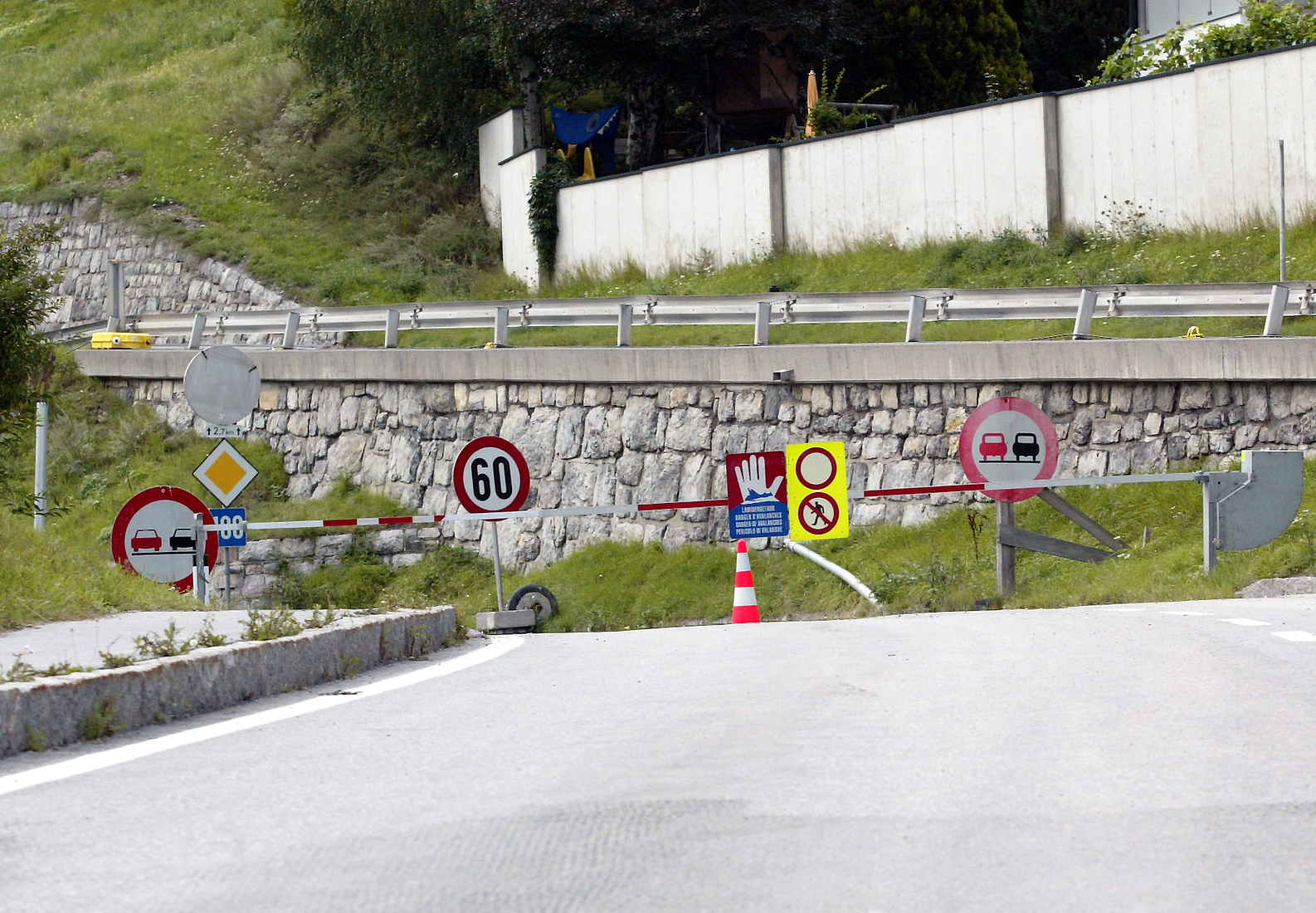
Road closures in the Alps.

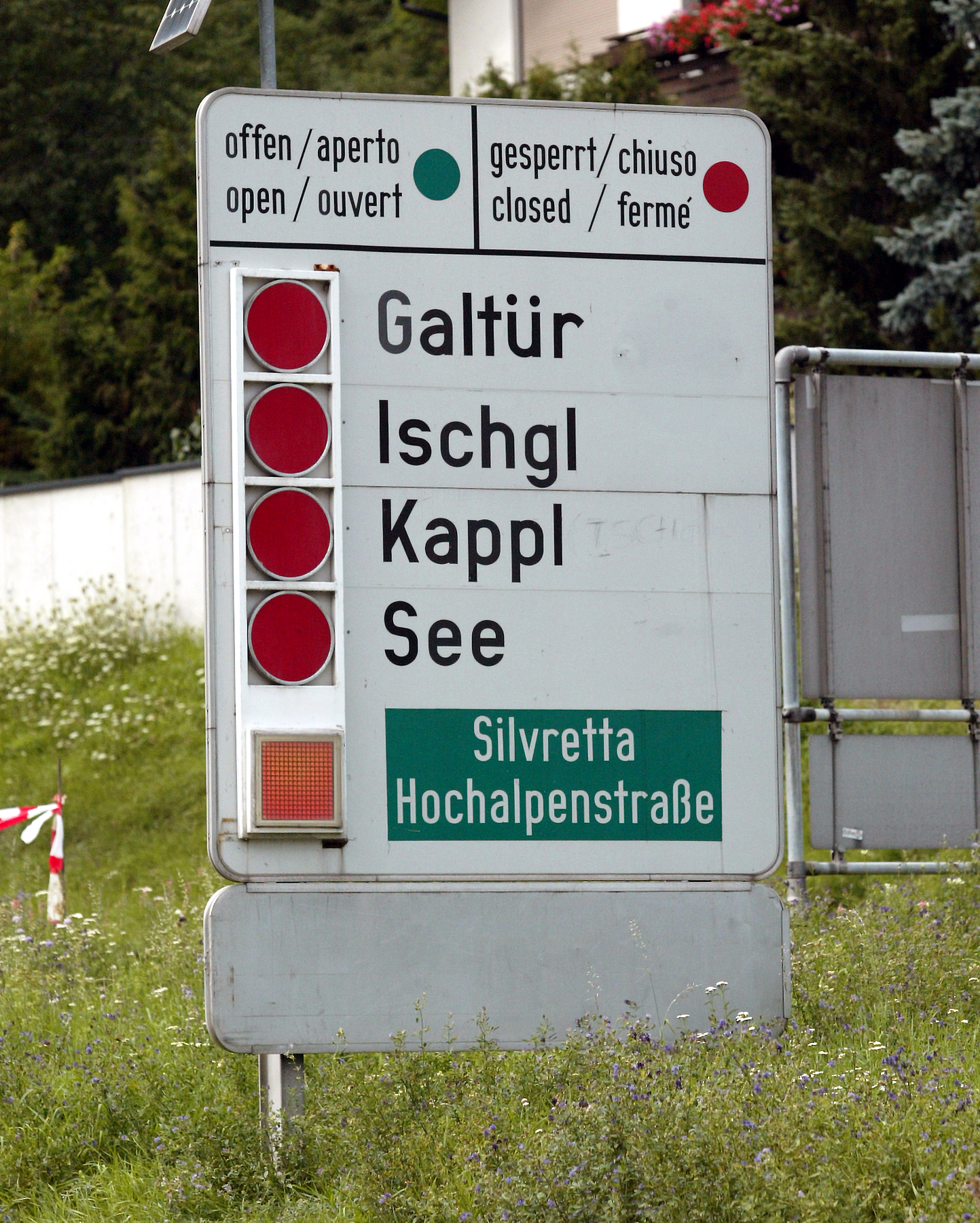
The Paznaun Valley is cut off from the rest of Austria.

=== Romania ===
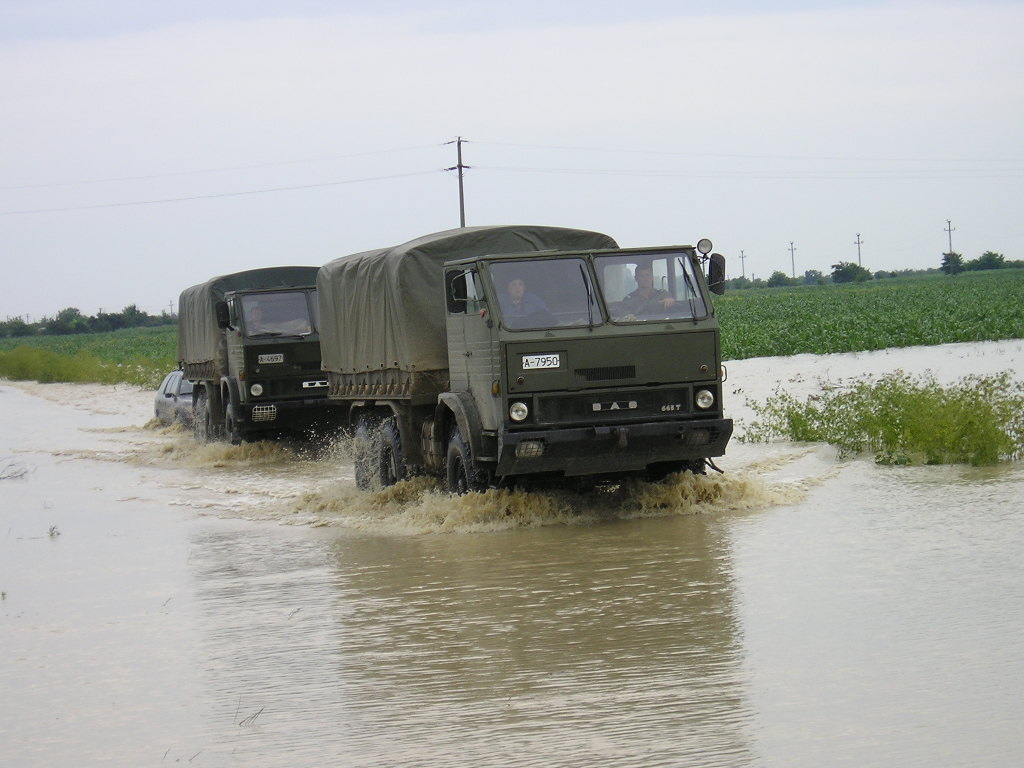
DAC military trucks near Nănești, Vrancea County

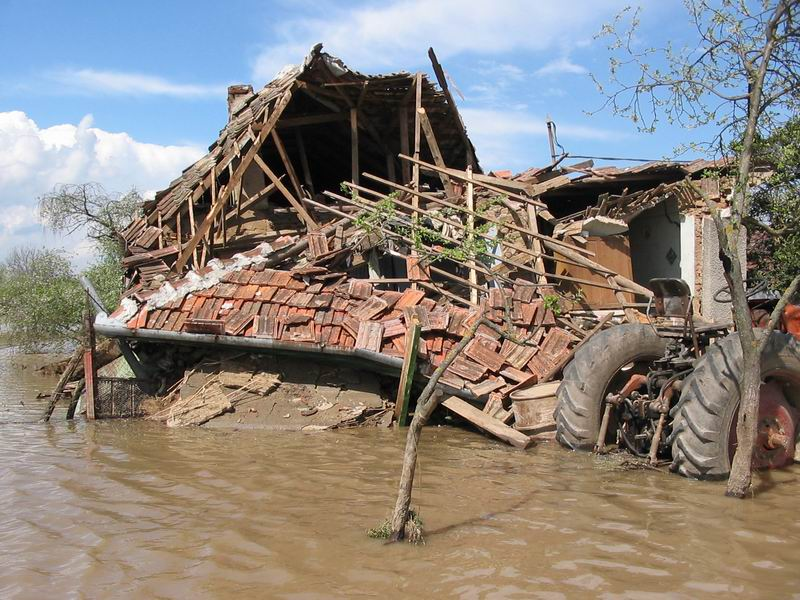
Flood of the Berzava River in Banat

Romania was the most affected by the 2005 floods, as it was faced with the most powerful and widespread floods and also the highest loss of life, with 31 dead. Total damages are estimated to be valued at more than 5 billion lei (€1.5 billion).

In mid August, the North-East region of Romania was heavily affected, with 1,473 evacuated from their homes in Iași, Suceava and Botoșani starting from 16 August. In Suceava county, 555 km of roads were affected, while nearly 600 bridges were flooded, resulting in the flooding of 520 houses, 16 of which were significantly destroyed. Several communications networks, particularly electric cables and optical fibres, were also affected.

Before it had ended, on 22 August 2005, the Ministry of Interior was reported as saying that floods and landslides affected over 500 villages in 31 districts: 200 homes completely destroyed, 2,000+ other structures affected, 11,000 households flooded, 9,000 wells flooded with rainfall and groundwater displacement, 34,000+ hectares of farmland and 2,000+ hectares of forests and grasslands destroyed, 9 kilometers of highway, 265 kilometers of county roads and 906 other roads were all severely damaged, and 25 cities lost power.

Floods were particularly acute in the central county of Harghita, where flooding hit the town of Odorheiu Secuiesc and surrounding localities in mid-to-late August. The flooding was most intense in the period from 24 to 25 August, when ten people were killed, a further five were declared missing and 1,400 households were flooded. Other counties significantly affected in late August were Mureș, Prahova and Bistrița-Năsăud. The city of Târgu Mureș, an important regional centre, was also affected by the rising of waters on the Târnava River, even though there wasn't a significant amount of damage caused to infrastructure.

In northwestern Romania, the counties of Bihor and Cluj were also affected, although on a smaller scale than Harghita. In Cluj County, over 100 houses were flooded, with the flooding centred on the town of Turda. Railway lines in the county were also closed. The localities of Popeşti, Suplacu de Barcău and Valea lui Mihai were affected in Bihor County.

=== Central Europe and the Alpine region ===
The Swiss capital of Bern was also heavily hit after the Aar burst its banks, and the town of Brienz saw 400 residents evacuated. The village of Lauterbrunnen in the Bernese Alps was completely cut off. The only exit from the town is by a very narrow gorge just wide enough to take the river, road and railway, and the river expanded to fill the entire gorge. This stranded thousands of tourists in the village, and the only way out was by helicopter or by crossing one of the high Alpine passes.

The Tyrol and Vorarlberg states of Austria saw many areas cut off by flooded roads. The lower part of the Rhine overflowed, affecting the Swiss Graubünden Canton, as well as parts of Vorarlberg. The river Danube and its tributaries overflowed in many places, flooding parts of Germany, Bavaria in particular. Several floodings and landslides were reported in Lower Austria and Styria.

The floods also meant the temporary closure of many mountain passes, amongst them the Gotthard in Switzerland, and the Arlberg in Austria. On a section of the Arlberg, the road and rail were washed away. Austrian Federal Railways have issued a statement (in German) that the rail line reconstruction will take at least a month. The main phone and data line between Vorarlberg and the rest of Austria was destroyed and had to be replaced by a radio communication. With rain and flood waters subsiding on 27 August, people started to return to their homes, rail and road routes reopened and the cleanup began.

The town of Jaša Tomić in Serbia was devastated by floods. Poland, where seven bridges collapsed, and Slovenia were also affected by flooding in August.

=== Other countries ===
Bulgaria and Moldova were also affected, though to a lesser extent. In Bulgaria, three months of rain and flooding killed 20 people and left 14,000 homeless. The country was hit by further floods in August (normally a very dry month), though these did not cause such widespread damage, but caused damage to the year's crops, causing an increase in the price of fruit and vegetables. Moldova was also hit by torrential rains in August.
