= Heroes' Bridge, Timișoara =

Heroes' Bridge Podul Eroilor
- Coordinates: 45°44′47″N 21°12′26″E
- Carries: Motor vehicles, pedestrians, bicycles
- Crosses: Bega Canal
- Locale: Timișoara, Romania
- Other name(s): Bem Bridge
- Preceded by: Iuliu Maniu Bridge
- Followed by: General Ion Dragalina Bridge

History
- Engineering design by: Ioan Polen
- Construction start: 1870
- Construction end: 1871
- Rebuilt: 1938

The Heroes' Bridge (Romanian: Podul Eroilor) is located in the western Romanian city of Timisoara. It crosses the Bega River in the Iosefin district.

Other names for the bridge are Podul Bem (Bem Bridge), Podul de la Elba (Elba Bridge), and Podul Pieței Iosefin (Iosefin Market Bridge) in Romanian, as well as Püspök híd and Bem híd in Hungarian.

== History ==
At the end of the 19th century, between Iancu Văcărescu and Dimitrie Bolintineanu streets, across from Iosefin market, stood the Bem Bridge. This metal bridge, built in 1870–1871 alongside the Hunyadi Bridge, was one of the first metal bridges in Timișoara, constructed on a brick foundation. By 1927 it had reached a very poor state and was supported by a temporary wooden structure. In 1938 it was demolished and replaced with a reinforced concrete bridge, designed by engineer Ioan Polen from the municipal technical service. Notable features of the new bridge included an elegant balustrade and stone pedestals, which supported decorative wrought iron lighting poles. During the communist era, the street was closed, and the bridge lost much of its significance.

From 2018 to 2019, the bridge's carriageway was expanded to four lanes, and sidewalks and bike paths were constructed.
