= 1869 =

1869 in various calendars
- Gregorian calendar: 1869; MDCCCLXIX
- Ab urbe condita: 2622
- Armenian calendar: 1318; ԹՎ ՌՅԺԸ
- Assyrian calendar: 6619
- Baháʼí calendar: 25–26
- Balinese saka calendar: 1790–1791
- Bengali calendar: 1275–1276
- Berber calendar: 2819
- British Regnal year: 32 Vict. 1 – 33 Vict. 1
- Buddhist calendar: 2413
- Burmese calendar: 1231
- Byzantine calendar: 7377–7378
- Chinese calendar: 戊辰年 (Earth Dragon); 4566 or 4359 — to — 己巳年 (Earth Snake); 4567 or 4360
- Coptic calendar: 1585–1586
- Discordian calendar: 3035
- Ethiopian calendar: 1861–1862
- Hebrew calendar: 5629–5630
- Hindu calendars
- Vikram Samvat: 1925–1926
- Shaka Samvat: 1790–1791
- Kali Yuga: 4969–4970
- Holocene calendar: 11869
- Igbo calendar: 869–870
- Iranian calendar: 1247–1248
- Islamic calendar: 1285–1286
- Japanese calendar: Meiji 2 (明治２年)
- Javanese calendar: 1797–1798
- Julian calendar: Gregorian minus 12 days
- Korean calendar: 4202
- Minguo calendar: 43 before ROC 民前43年
- Nanakshahi calendar: 401
- Thai solar calendar: 2411–2412
- Tibetan calendar: ས་ཕོ་འབྲུག་ལོ་ (male Earth-Dragon); 1995 or 1614 or 842 — to — ས་མོ་སྦྲུལ་ལོ་ (female Earth-Snake); 1996 or 1615 or 843

1869 (MDCCCLXIX) was a common year starting on Friday of the Gregorian calendar and a common year starting on Wednesday of the Julian calendar, the 1869th year of the Common Era (CE) and Anno Domini (AD) designations, the 869th year of the 2nd millennium, the 69th year of the 19th century, and the 10th and last year of the 1860s decade. As of the start of 1869, the Gregorian calendar was 12 days ahead of the Julian calendar, which remained in localized use until 1923.

== Events ==
=== January ===
- January 3 – Abdur Rahman Khan is defeated at Tinah Khan, and exiled from Afghanistan.
- January 5 – Scotland's second oldest professional football team, Kilmarnock F.C., is founded.
- January 20 – Elizabeth Cady Stanton is the first woman to testify before the United States Congress.
- January 21 – The P.E.O. Sisterhood, a philanthropic educational organization for women, is founded at Iowa Wesleyan College in Mount Pleasant, Iowa.
- January 27 – The Republic of Ezo is proclaimed on the northern Japanese island of Ezo (which will be renamed Hokkaidō on September 20) by remaining adherents to the Tokugawa shogunate.

=== February ===
- February 5 – Prospectors in Moliagul, Victoria, Australia, discover the largest alluvial gold nugget ever found, known as the "Welcome Stranger".
- February 20 – Ranavalona II, the Merina Queen of Madagascar, is baptized.
- February 25 – The Iron and Steel Institute is formed in London.
- February 26 – Mahbub Ali Khan, 2½, begins a 42-year reign as Nizam of Hyderabad.

=== March ===
- March 1
  - The North German Confederation issues 10gr and 30gr value stamps, printed on goldbeater's skin.
  - (O. S. February 17) – Dmitri Mendeleev finishes his design of the first periodic table and sends it for publishing.
- March 18 (O. S. March 6) – Dmitri Mendeleev makes a formal presentation of his periodic table to the Russian Chemical Society.
- March 24 – Tītokowaru's War ends with the surrender of the last Māori troops at large, in the South Taranaki District of New Zealand's North Island.
- March – In Japan, the daimyōs of the Tosa, Hizen, Satsuma and Chōshū Domains are persuaded to return their domains to the Emperor Meiji, leading to creation of a fully centralized government in the country.

=== April ===
- April 6 – The American Museum of Natural History is founded in New York.
- April 17 – The State of Morelos is created in Mexico.

=== May ===
- May 4–10 – Naval Battle of Hakodate: The Imperial Japanese Navy defeats adherents of the Tokugawa shogunate.
- May 6 – Purdue University is founded in West Lafayette, Indiana.
- May 10 – The first transcontinental railroad in North America is completed at Promontory, Utah, by the driving of the "golden spike".
  May 10 – The First transcontinental railroad in North America is completed
- May 15 – Women's suffrage: In New York, Susan B. Anthony and Elizabeth Cady Stanton form the National Woman Suffrage Association.
- May 18 – One day after surrendering at the land Battle of Hakodate (begun 4 December 1868), Enomoto Takeaki turns over Goryōkaku to Japanese forces, signaling the collapse of the Republic of Ezo.
- May 22 – Sainsbury's first store, in Drury Lane, London, is opened.
- May 24 – John Wesley Powell departs Green River, Wyoming, with a company of nine other men, on a trip down the Green and Colorado Rivers.
- May 26 – Boston University is chartered by the Commonwealth of Massachusetts.
- May – In elections in France, the opposition, consisting of republicans, monarchists and liberals, polls almost 45% of the vote.

=== June ===
- June 1 – The Cincinnati Red Stockings open the baseball season as the first fully professional team.
- June 2 – Sherwood College is founded in Nainital, India.
- June 15 – John Wesley Hyatt patents celluloid in Albany, New York.
- June 27 – The fortress of Goryōkaku is turned over to Imperial Japanese forces, bringing an end to the Republic of Ezo, the Battle of Hakodate and the Boshin War, the military phase of the Meiji Restoration.
- June 30–July 2 – The first Estonian Song Festival takes place in Tartu.

=== July ===
- July 10 – Gävle, Sweden, is destroyed in a city fire; 8,000 people become homeless.
- July 15 – Hippolyte Mège-Mouriès files a patent for margarine in France.
- July 20
  - The Innocents Abroad, by Mark Twain, goes on sale after printing by the American Publishing Company. It becomes Twain's bestselling work during his lifetime.
  - Children's Hospital Boston is founded by Dr. Francis Henry Brown and other Harvard Medical School graduates, as a 20-bed facility in the South End of Boston, Massachusetts.
- July 26 – The Irish Church Act 1869 is given royal assent by Queen Victoria, disestablishing the Church of Ireland effective January 1, 1871.

=== August ===
- August 9 – August Bebel and Wilhelm Liebknecht found the Social Democratic Workers' Party of Germany (SDAP).
- August 27 – The University of Oxford wins the first international boat race held on the River Thames, against Harvard University.
- August 31 – Irish scientist Mary Ward is killed by a steam car.

=== September ===
- September 5 – The foundation stone is laid for Neuschwanstein Castle in Bavaria (southern Germany).
- September 11 – Work on the Wallace Monument is completed in Stirling, Scotland.
- September 12–13 – P&O's SS Carnatic runs aground and sinks in the Red Sea; 31 drown.
- September 24 – Black Friday: The James Fisk–Jay Gould Scandal causes a financial panic in the United States.

=== October ===
- October 11
  - The Red River Rebellion breaks out against British forces in Canada.
  - Gamma Sigma becomes the first high school fraternity in North America at Brockport Normal School, Brockport, New York.
- October 16 – England's first residential university-level women's college, the College for Women (predecessor of Girton College, Cambridge), is founded at Hitchin, by Emily Davies and Barbara Bodichon.
- October – The 'Edinburgh Seven', led by Sophia Jex-Blake, start to attend lectures at the University of Edinburgh Medical School, the first women in the United Kingdom to do so (although they will not be allowed to take degrees).

=== November ===
- November 4 – The first issue of the scientific journal Nature is published in London, edited by Norman Lockyer.
- November 6 – The first game of American football between two American colleges is played. Rutgers University defeats Princeton University 6–4, in a forerunner to American football and College football.
- November 13 – The Newfoundland Colony rejects confederation with Canada in election. The Anti-Confederates winning 21–9.
- November 17 – In Egypt, the Suez Canal, linking the Mediterranean Sea with the Red Sea, is inaugurated in an elaborate ceremony.
- November 19 – The Hudson's Bay Company surrenders its claim to Rupert's Land in Canada, under its letters patent, back to the British Crown.
- November 23 – In Dumbarton, Scotland, the clipper ship Cutty Sark is launched (it is one of the last clippers built, and the only one to survive in the United Kingdom).

=== December ===
- December 7 – American outlaw Jesse James commits his first confirmed bank robbery, in Gallatin, Missouri.
- December 8 – The First Vatican Council opens in Rome.
- December 10
  - Women's suffrage: The Wyoming territorial legislature gives women the right to vote, the first such law in the world.
  - The first American chapter of Kappa Sigma is founded at the University of Virginia.
- December 31 – Paraguayan War: Triple Alliance forces take Asunción.
- December – Leo Tolstoy's novel War and Peace is published in complete book form, in Russia.

=== Date unknown ===
- The investment bank Goldman Sachs is founded in New York.
- The capital of the Isle of Man moves from Castletown to Douglas.
- Arabella Mansfield became the first woman in the United States awarded a license to practice law, at Mount Pleasant, Iowa.
- James Gordon Bennett Jr. of the New York Herald asks Henry Morton Stanley to find Dr. David Livingstone.
- The Co-operative Central Board (later Co-operatives UK) is founded in Manchester, England.
- Friedrich Miescher purifies nuclein, which was then identified as deoxyribonucleic acid (DNA).
- The Ladies National Association for the Repeal of the Contagious Diseases Acts is founded in Great Britain.
- French missionary and naturalist Père Armand David receives the skin of a giant panda from a hunter, the first time this species becomes known to a Westerner; he also first describes a specimen of the "pocket handkerchief tree", which will be named in his honor as Davidia involucrata.
- New Zealand's first university, the University of Otago, is founded.
- Thomas Henry Huxley coins the word "Agnostic".
- Campbell's is founded in New Jersey, United States.
- Heinz, as predecessor of Kraft Heinz, a worldwide food processing and cheese brand, founded in Pennsylvania, United States.
- St. Ignatius College Prep in Chicago is founded, and construction on the school's main building began. It is one of only five buildings that survived the Great Chicago Fire of 1871. The building was designed by the Canadian architect Toussaint Menard in the Second Empire architecture style.
- The Timișoara horse-drawn railway, opened in 1869.

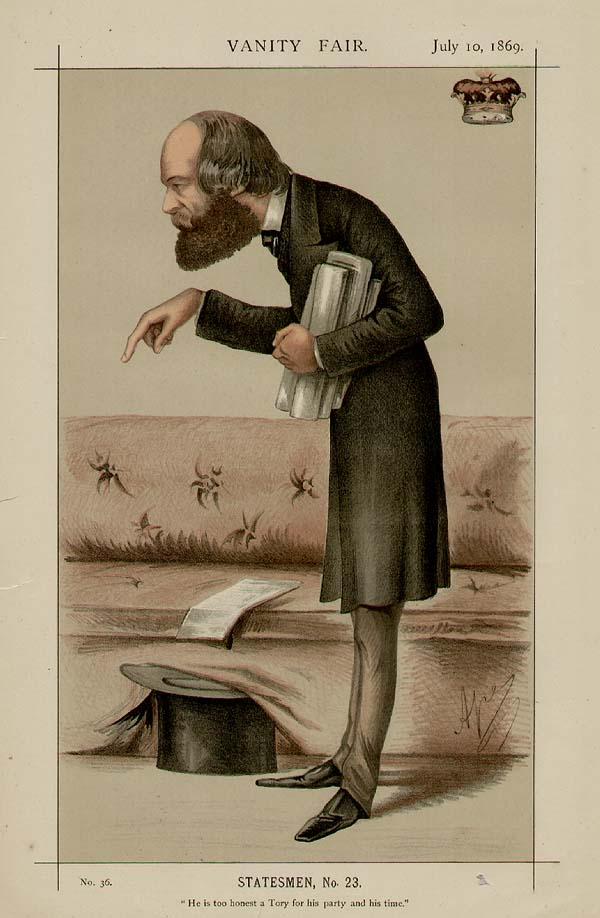
The Marquess of Salisbury caricatured by "Ape" in Vanity Fair', 1869 - Carlo Pellegrini (25 March 1839 – 22 January 1889), who did much of his work under the pseudonym of Ape

== Births ==
=== January–March ===
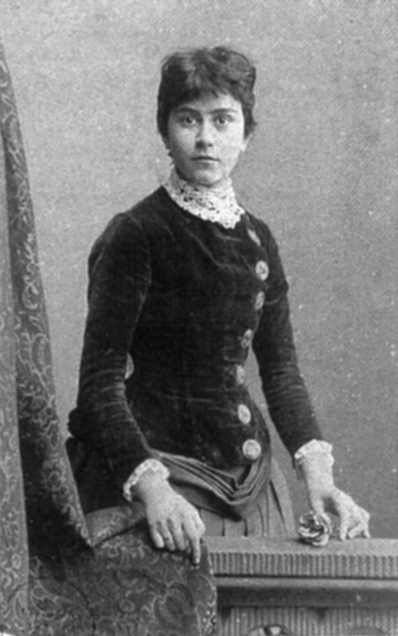
Else Lasker-Schüler

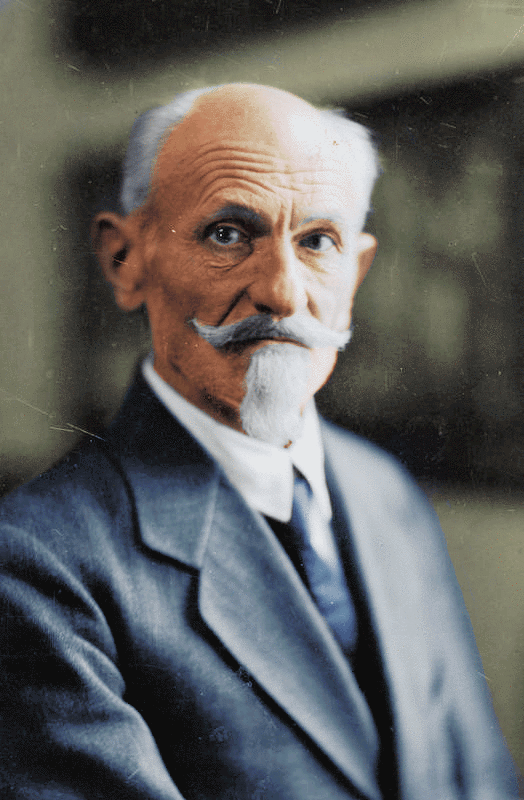
Stanisław Wojciechowski

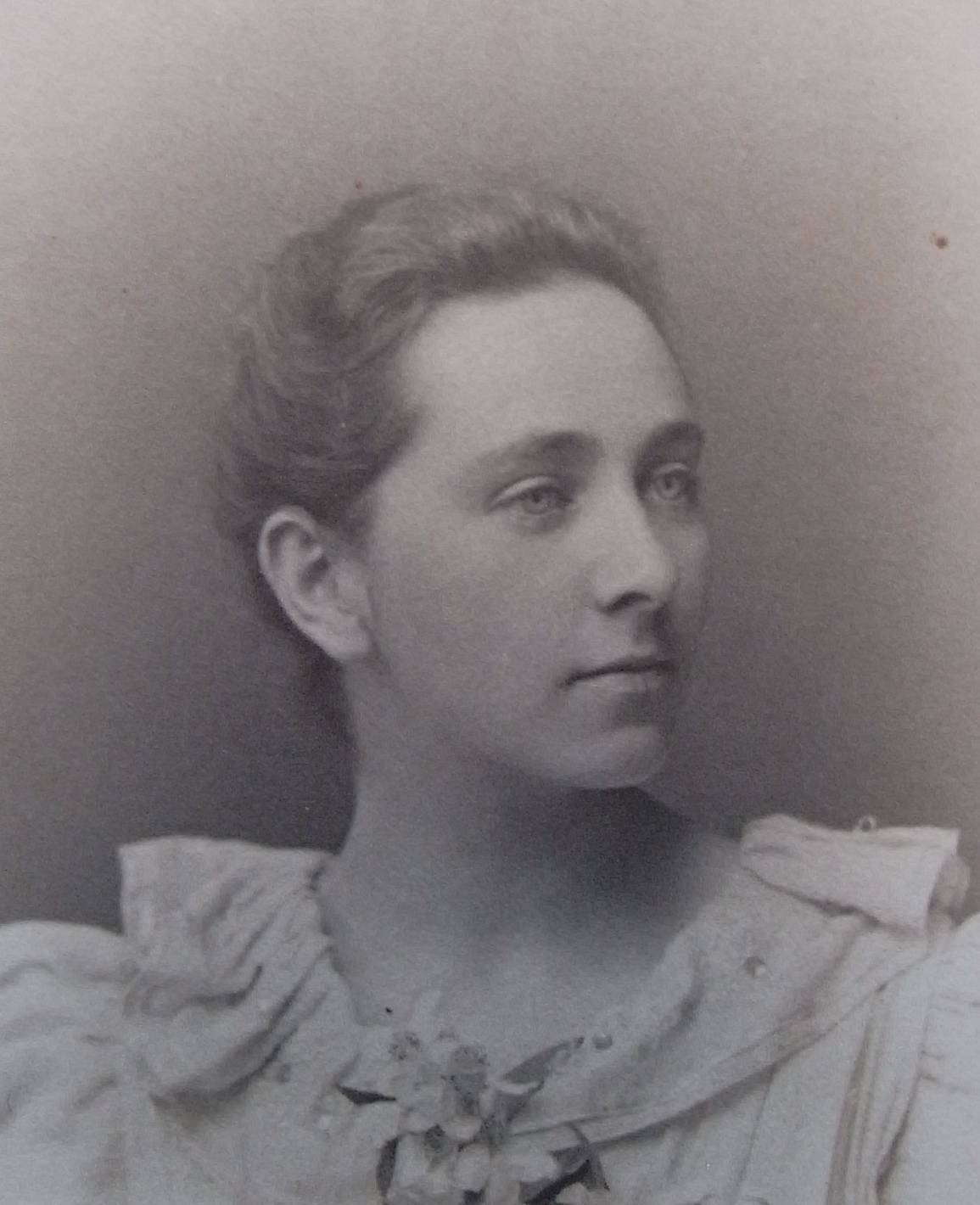
Edith Anne Stoney

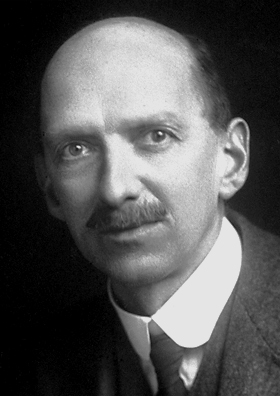
Charles Thomson Rees Wilson

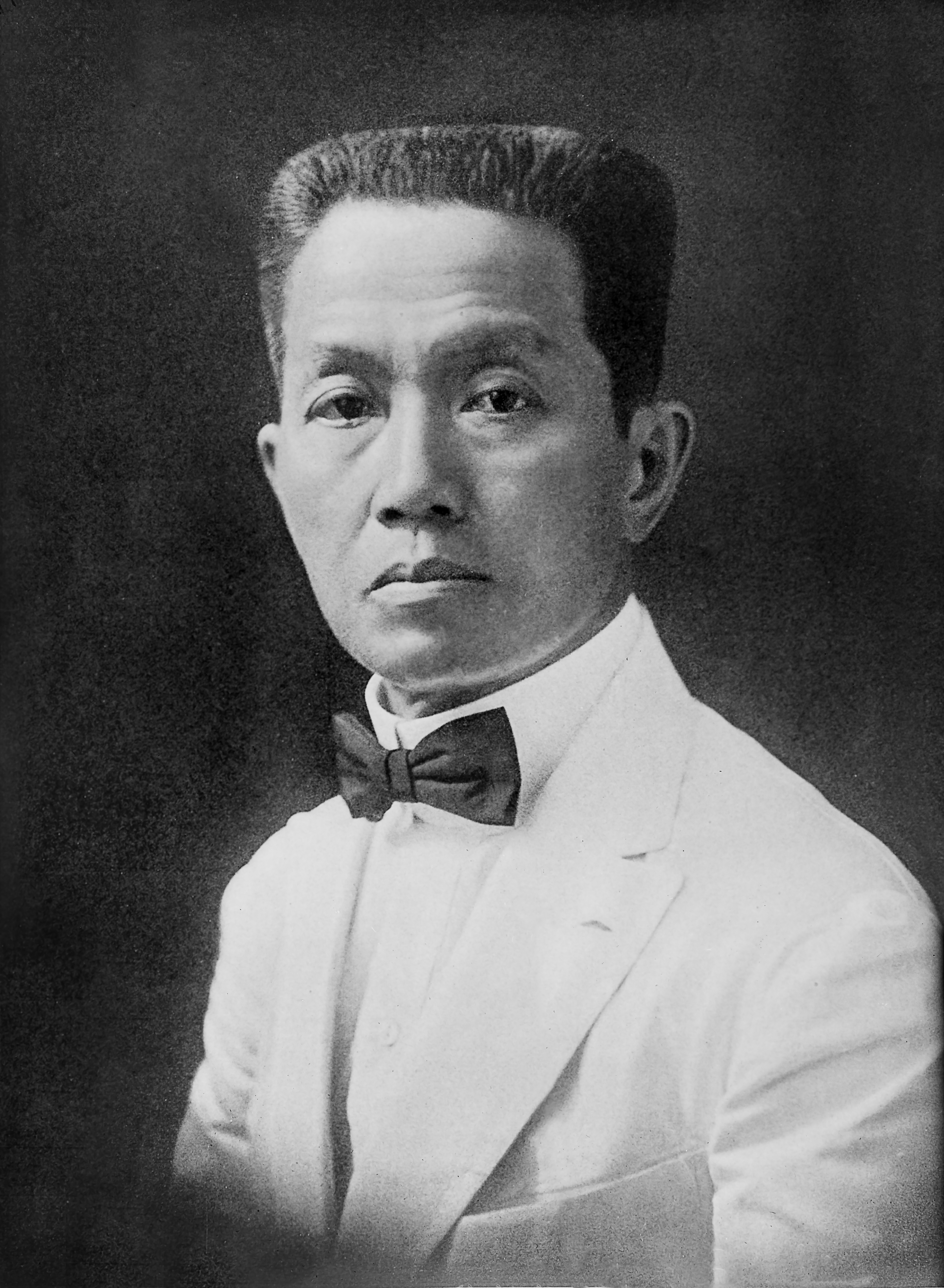
Emilio Aguinaldo

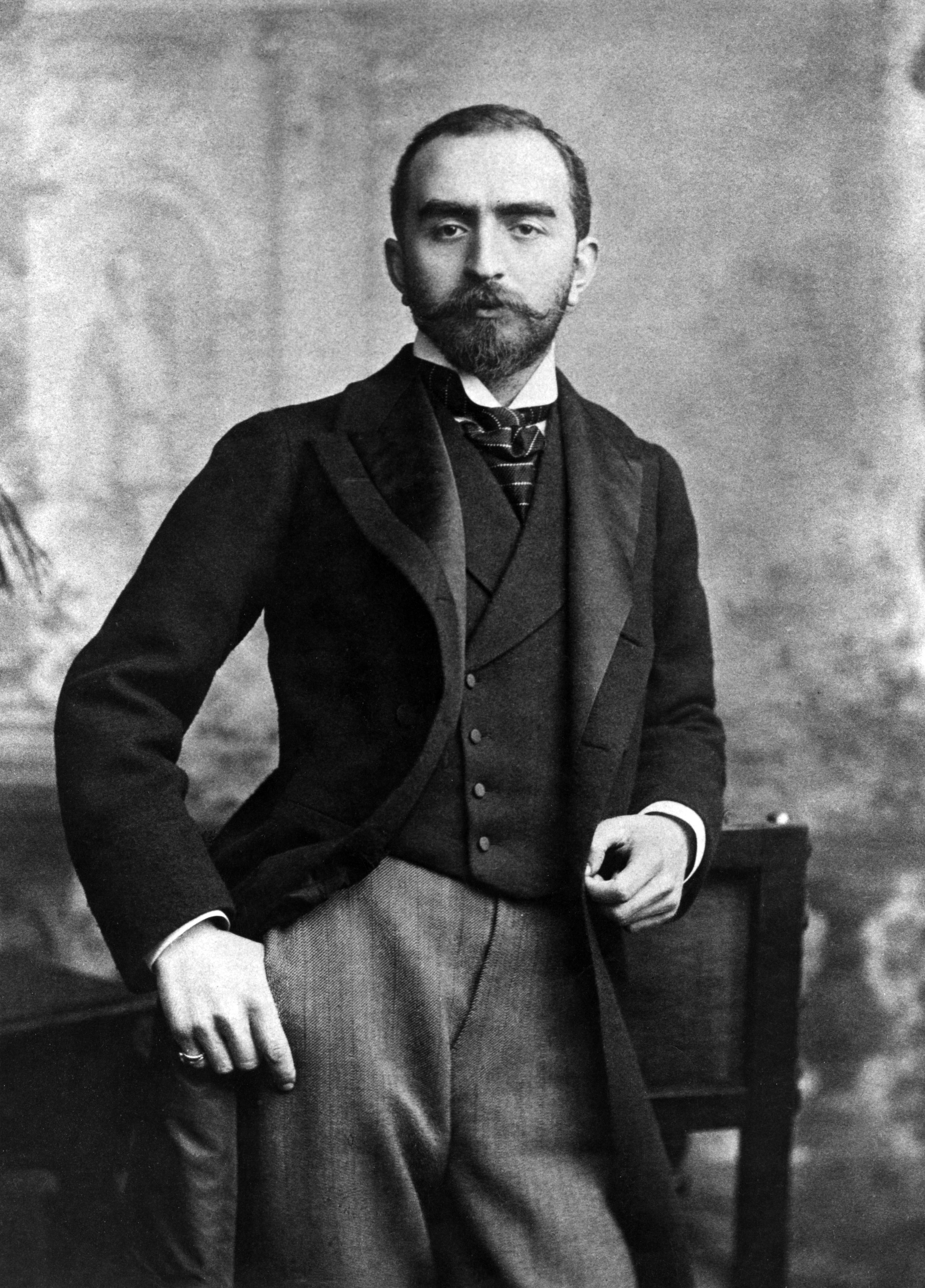
Calouste Gulbenkian

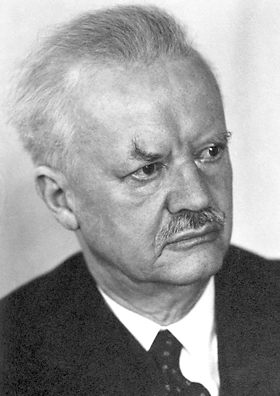
Hans Spemann

- January 6 – Edith Anne Stoney, Irish physicist (d. 1938)
- January 9 – Grigori Rasputin, Russian mystic (d. 1916)
- January 11 – Carl Theodore Vogelgesang, American admiral (d. 1927)
- January 13 – Emanuele Filiberto, 2nd Duke of Aosta, Italian general, Marshal of Italy (d. 1931)
- January 15 – Stanisław Wyspiański, Polish dramatist, poet, painter and architect (d. 1907)
- January 21 – Agnelo de Souza, Portuguese Roman Catholic priest, missionary and saint (d. 1927)
- January 22 – José Vicente de Freitas, Portuguese colonel and politician, 97th Prime Minister of Portugal (d. 1952)
- January 24
  - Ernest Broșteanu, Romanian general (d. 1932)
  - Yoshinori Shirakawa, Japanese general (d. 1932)
- January 25 – Max Hoffmann, German general (d. 1927)
- February 11
  - Helene Kröller-Müller, Dutch museum founder, patron of the arts (d. 1939)
  - Else Lasker-Schüler, German-born poet, author (d. 1945)
- February 14 – Charles Thomson Rees Wilson, Scottish physicist, Nobel laureate (d. 1959)
- February 26 – Nadezhda Krupskaya, Russian Marxist revolutionary, Vladimir Lenin's wife (d. 1939)
- February 27 – Alice Hamilton, American physician (d. 1970)
- February 28 – William V. Pratt, American admiral (d. 1957)
- March 3
  - Michael von Faulhaber, German cardinal, archbishop (d. 1952)
  - Henry Wood, British conductor (d. 1944)
- March 12 – George Forbes, New Zealand Prime Minister, first leader of the New Zealand National Party (d. 1947)
- March 14 – Algernon Blackwood, English writer (d. 1951)
- March 15 – Stanisław Wojciechowski, 2nd President of the Republic of Poland (d. 1953)
- March 18 – Neville Chamberlain, Prime Minister of the United Kingdom (d. 1940)
- March 22 – Emilio Aguinaldo, 1st President of the Philippines (d. 1964)
- March 23 – Calouste Gulbenkian, British-Armenian businessman and philanthropist (d. 1955)
- March 29 – Edwin Lutyens, British architect (d. 1944)

=== April–June ===
- April 2 – Hughie Jennings, American baseball player (d. 1928)
- April 4 – Mary Colter, American architect (d. 1958)
- April 8
  - Harvey Cushing, American neurosurgeon (d. 1939)
  - Ignatius Maloyan, Armenian Eastern Catholic archbishop and blessed (d. 1915)
- April 10 – Signe Bergman, Swedish suffragist (d. 1960)
- April 11 – Gustav Vigeland, Norwegian sculptor (d. 1943)
- April 12 – Henri Désiré Landru, French serial killer (executed 1922)
- May 3 – Warren Terhune, United States Navy Commander, 13th Governor of American Samoa (d. 1920)
- May 5 – Hans Pfitzner, German composer (d. 1949)
- May 9 – Tyrone Power Sr., English-born American actor (d. 1931)
- May 12 – Carl Schuhmann, German athlete (d. 1946)
- May 13 – Bob Dalton, Wild Western outlaw (d. 1892)
- May 14 – Percy Abbott, Australian politician (d. 1940)
- May 18
  - Rupprecht, Crown Prince of Bavaria, Bavarian military leader, last Bavarian crown prince (d. 1955)
  - Lucy Beaumont, English actress (d. 1937)
- May 20 – John Stone Stone, American physicist, inventor (d. 1943)
- May 24 – Ivan Aguéli, Swedish wandering Sufi, artist (d. 1917)
- May 28 – Hugo Meurer, German admiral (d. 1960)
- May 30 – Giulio Douhet, Italian general, air power theorist (d. 1930)
- June 17 – Flora Finch, English-born comedian (d. 1940)
- June 24 – Prince George of Greece and Denmark, high commissioner of the Cretan State (d. 1957)
- June 27
  - Emma Goldman, Russian-born anarchist (d. 1940)
  - Hans Spemann, German embryologist, recipient of the Nobel Prize in Physiology or Medicine (d. 1941)

=== July–September ===
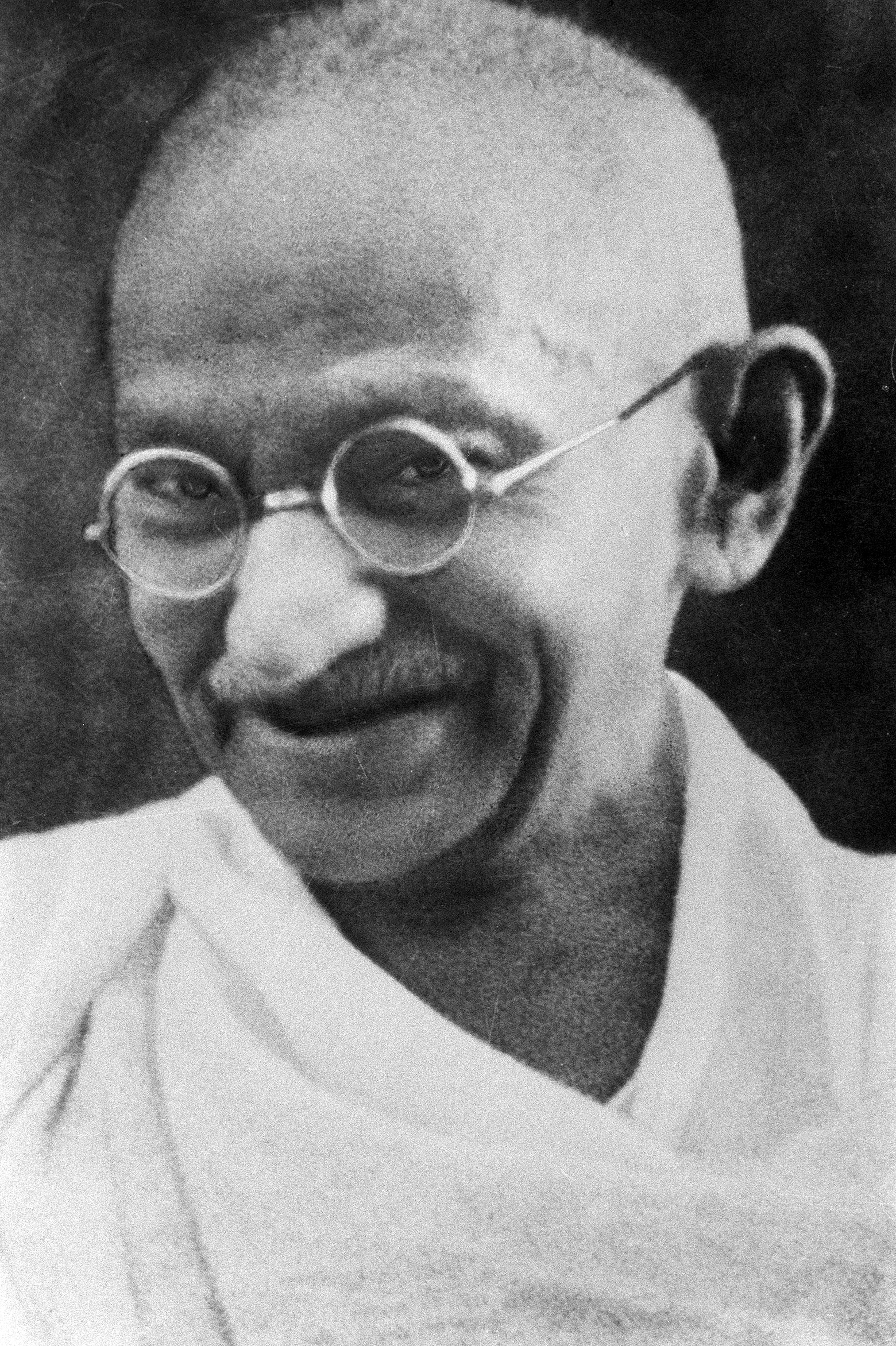
Mohandas Gandhi

Victor Emmanuel III

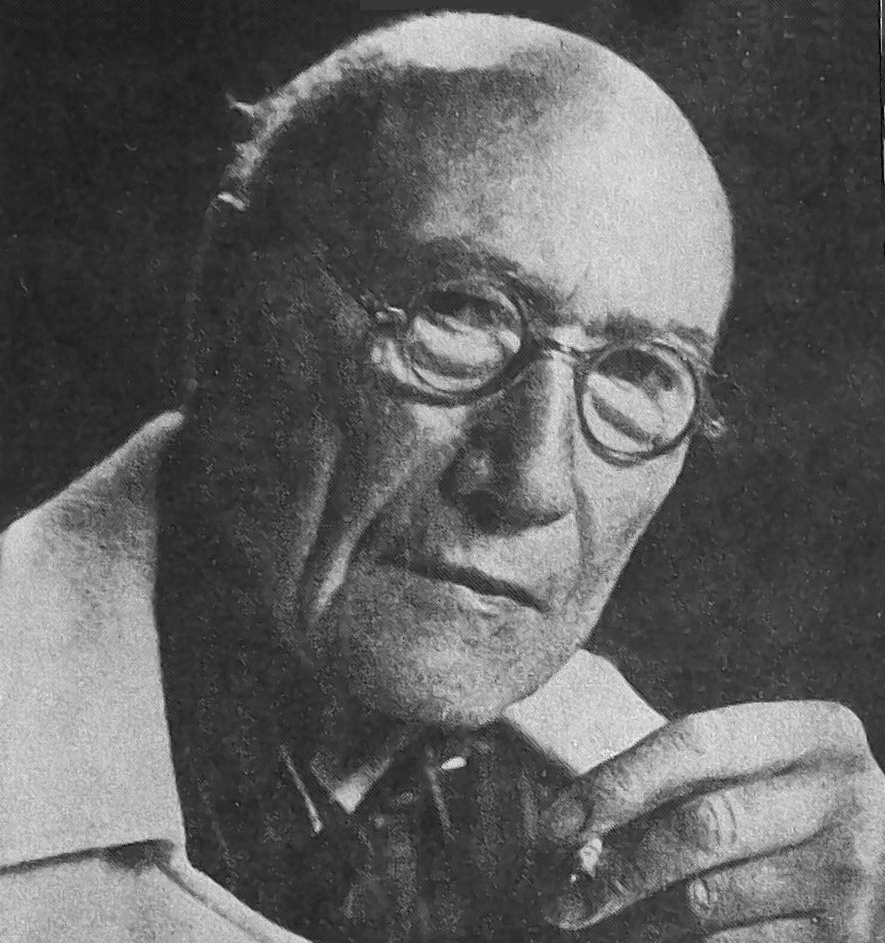
André Gide

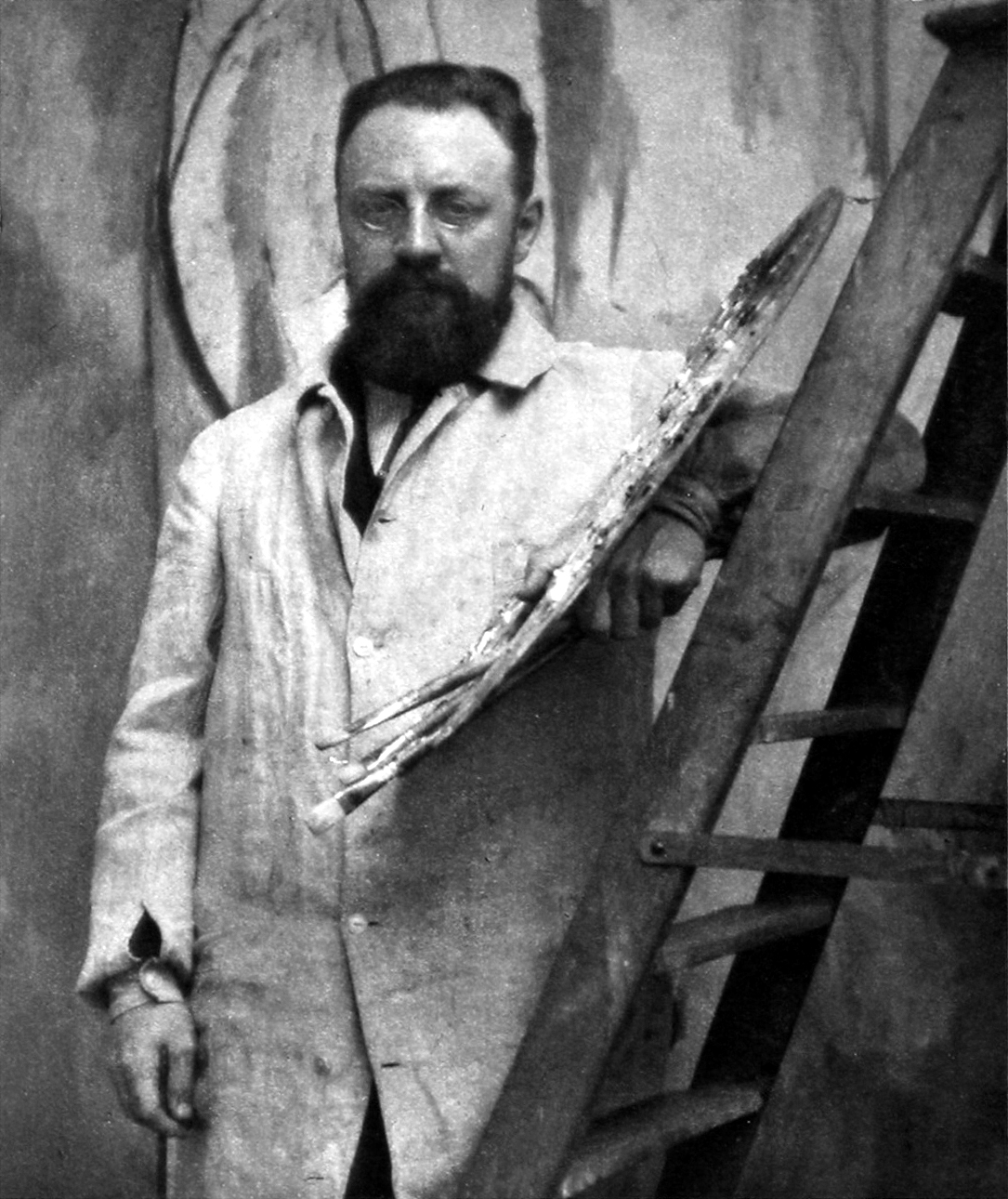
Henri Matisse

- July 11 – Pío Valenzuela, Filipino doctor, patriot (d. 1956)
- July 19 – Xenophon Stratigos, Greek general (d. 1927)
- July 30 – Cristóbal Magallanes Jara, Mexican Roman Catholic priest, martyr and saint (d. 1927)
- August 11 – Hale Holden, president of Chicago, Burlington and Quincy Railroad (d. 1940)
- August 13 – Paul Behncke, German admiral (d. 1937)
- August 16 – Mignon Talbot, American paleontologist (d. 1950)
- September 2 – Anna DeCosta Banks, American nurse (d. 1930)
- September 3 – Fritz Pregl, Austrian chemist, Nobel Prize laureate (d. 1930)
- September 6 – Felix Salten, Austrian author and critic (d. 1945)
- September 17 – Christian Lous Lange, Norwegian pacifist, recipient of the Nobel Peace Prize (d. 1938)
- September 19 – Ben Turpin, American actor and comedian (d. 1940)
- September 23 – Mary Mallon (Typhoid Mary), first known (in the United States) asymptomatic carrier of the pathogen associated with typhoid fever (d. 1938)
- September 26 – Winsor McCay, American cartoonist, animator (d. 1934)

=== October–December ===
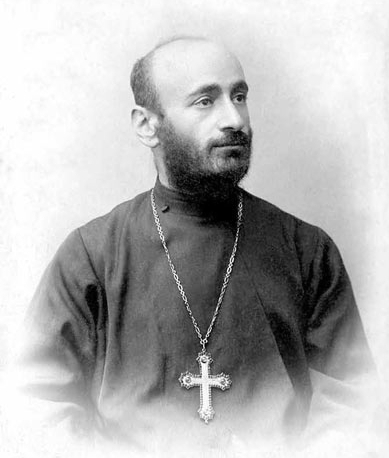
Komitas

- October 2 – Mahatma Gandhi, Indian political leader, Father of the Nation (d. 1948)
- October 8 – Komitas, Armenian composer, Father of Armenian national school of music (d. 1935)
- October 18 – Johannes Linnankoski, Finnish author (d. 1913)
- October 21 – William Dodd, American historian, diplomat (d. 1940)
- October 25 – John Heisman, American football coach (d. 1936)
- October 26 – Washington Luís, 13th President of Brazil (d. 1957)
- October 31 – William A. Moffett, American admiral (d. 1933)
- November 10 – Wayne Wheeler, American temperance movement leader (d. 1927)
- November 11 – Victor Emmanuel III, King of Italy (d. 1947)
- November 20 – Herbert Tudor Buckland, British Arts and Crafts architect (d. 1951)
- November 22 – André Gide, French writer, Nobel laureate (d. 1951)
- November 24 – Óscar Carmona, President of Portugal (d. 1951)
- November 25 – Herbert Greenfield, Premier of Alberta, Canada (d. 1949)
- November 30 – Gustaf Dalén, Swedish physicist, Nobel laureate (d. 1937)
- December 5 – Ellis Parker Butler, American humorist (d. 1937)
- December 16 – Hristo Tatarchev, Bulgarian revolutionary, leader of the revolutionary movement in Macedonia and Eastern Thrace (d. 1952)
- December 20 – Charley Grapewin, American vaudeville performer, stage and film actor (d. 1956)
- December 22 – Edwin Arlington Robinson, American poet (d. 1935)
- December 24 – Henriette Roland Holst, Dutch poet, socialist (d. 1952)
- December 30 – Stephen Leacock, British-Canadian author, economist (d. 1944)
- December 31 – Henri Matisse, French painter (d. 1954)

== Deaths ==
=== January–June ===
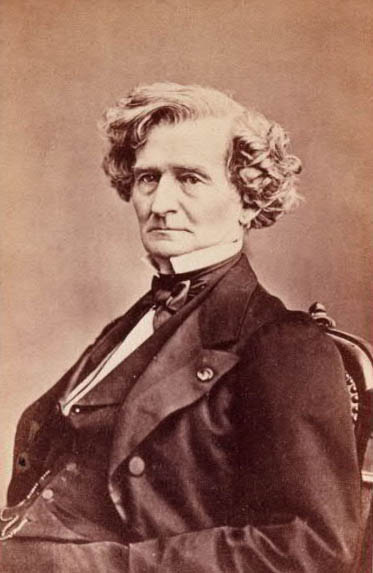
Hector Berlioz

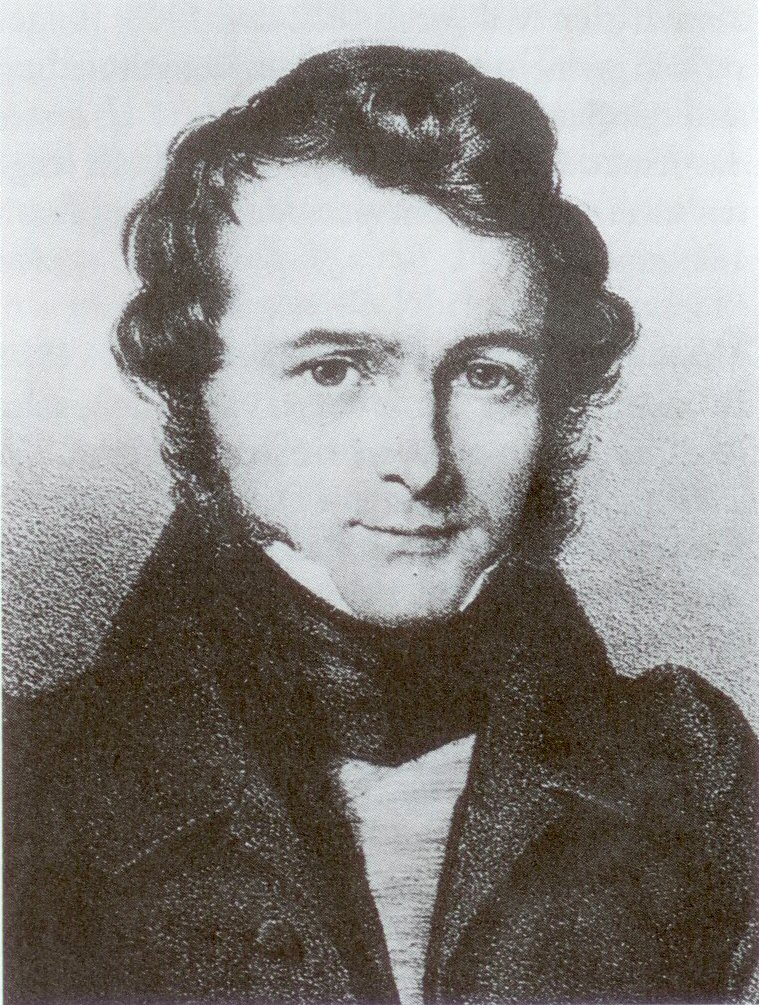
Christian Erich Hermann von Meyer

- January 1
  - Martin W. Bates, American senator (b. 1786)
  - James B. Longacre, fourth Chief Engraver of the U.S. Mint (b. 1794)
- January 18 – Bertalan Szemere, 3rd Prime Minister of Hungary (b. 1812)
- January 19 – Carl Reichenbach, German chemist (b. 1788)
- January 30
  - Frances Catherine Barnard, English author (b. 1796)
  - William Carleton, Irish novelist (b. 1794)
- February 15 – Ghalib, Indian poet (b. 1797)
- March 8 – Hector Berlioz, French composer (b. 1803)
- March 20 – John Pascoe Grenfell, British admiral of the Brazilian Navy (b. 1800)
- March 21 – Juan Almonte, Mexican general, diplomat and regent (b. 1803)
- March 22 – Antoine-Henri Jomini, French general (b. 1779)
- April 2 – Christian Erich Hermann von Meyer, German palaeontologist (b. 1801)
- April 20 – Carl Loewe, German composer (b. 1796)
- June 16 – Charles Sturt, Australian explorer (b. 1795)
- June 18 – Giovanni Battista Bugatti, Italian executioner (b. 1779)
- June 20 – Hijikata Toshizō, Japanese military commander (b. 1835)

=== July–December ===
- July 18 – Laurent Clerc, French advocate for the American deaf (b. 1785)
- July 22 – John A. Roebling, American bridge engineer (b. 1806)
- July 28 – Carl Gustav Carus, German physiologist (b. 1789)
- August 21 – Casto Méndez Núñez, Spanish admiral (b. 1824)
- August 31 – Mary Ward, Irish scientist, first car crash victim (b. 1827)
- September 4 – John Pascoe Fawkner, Australian pioneer, settler and politician, (b. 1792)
- September 10 – John Bell, American politician, 1860 presidential candidate, (b.1796)
- September 12 – Peter Mark Roget, British lexicographer (b. 1779)
- October 8 – Franklin Pierce, 64, 14th President of the United States (b. 1804)
- October 12 – Pyotr Anjou, arctic explorer and admiral of the Russian Navy (b. 1796)
- October 13 – Charles Augustin Sainte-Beuve, French literary critic (b. 1804)
- October 16 – Joseph Ritner, American politician (b. 1780)
- October 23 – Edward Smith-Stanley, 14th Earl of Derby, Prime Minister of the United Kingdom (b. 1799)
- October 31 – Charles A. Wickliffe, American politician, 14th Governor of Kentucky (b. 1788)
- November 8 – Christodoulos Hatzipetros, Greek military leader (b. 1799)
- November 10 – John E. Wool, general officer in the United States Army, who served during the War of 1812, Mexican–American War, and the American Civil War (b. 1784)
- December 8 – Narcisa de Jesús Martillo, Ecuadorian saint (b. 1832)
- December 18 – Louis Moreau Gottschalk, American composer, pianist (b. 1829)
- December 24 – Edwin Stanton, American lawyer, judge and politician (b. 1814)

== Yearbooks ==
- American Annual Cyclopedia...for 1869 (1870), large compendium of facts, worldwide coverage online edition
- The American year-book and national register for 1869 (1869) online
