= Timișoara horse-drawn railway =

Tramway in Timișoara

Technical
- Line length: 6,636 km (4,123 mi)
- Track gauge: 1435

The Timișoara horse-drawn railway, opened in 1869, formed the foundation of the Timișoara tramway, which was electrified in 1899. This standard-gauge horse tramway in Timișoara, then known as Temesvár in the Kingdom of Hungary and now part of Romania, was operated by the joint-stock company Temesvári Közúti Vaspálya Társaság (TKVT), or Temesvar Street Railway Company in German. From 1897, the company was renamed Temesvári Villamos Városi Vasút Részvénytársaság (TVVV). Today, it operates as a public limited company under the name Societatea de Transport Public Timișoara (S.T.P.T.).

== History ==
=== Previous history ===
On 15 November 1857, while part of the Austrian Empire, Temesvár was connected to the railway network of the private Austro-Hungarian State Railways. A new railway line from Szeged reached the capital of the Banat region. However, the new Timișoara railway station, now Gara de Nord, was located in the Josefstadt district, far from the city centre. The undeveloped fortress foreground separated the central Piața Libertății (then Jenő Herceg tér) from the railway station, approximately 2.5 kilometres away.

On 20 July 1858, the railway line was extended to Karasjeszenö, now Jasenovo in Serbia, running just a few hundred meters south of the fortress walls surrounding the inner city. For military reasons, no station was built there, leaving the railway's accessibility limited.

With the onset of industrialisation, the lack of transport links between the inner city and the Fabric district, a major industrial and residential area, became increasingly evident. In 1850, 70 per cent of Temesvár's population lived in the Fabric district, the city's largest at the time.

=== Granting of concession and start of construction ===
To improve urban transport, the company that would later operate the horse-drawn tramway was founded on 3 November 1867, shortly after the Austro-Hungarian Compromise. On 11 December 1867, it received building permit number 11.981 for the tramway's construction. On 12 February 1868, construction plans were submitted, followed by the concession on 20 February 1868, initially granted for 50 years.

A competing bid by entrepreneurs J. Krammer and A. Herzberg from Pest, then the Hungarian capital, was rejected. In March 1868, the city council deemed their offer more favourable, but the local company's prior concession prevailed. To address concerns, the company agreed to reduce the concession period from 50 to 40 years, formalized by the Ministry of Construction in Pest on 15 July 1868 via decree number 6530.

Construction of the railway, known in Hungarian as lóvasút (horse railway), began on 29 October 1868. In April 1869, engineer Heinrich Christian Baader was appointed to oversee construction and became company director on 1 July 1869. In May 1869, a land use agreement with the city required the company to cover a quarter of the costs for constructing and maintaining bridges used by the tramway.

=== Opening (July 1869) ===
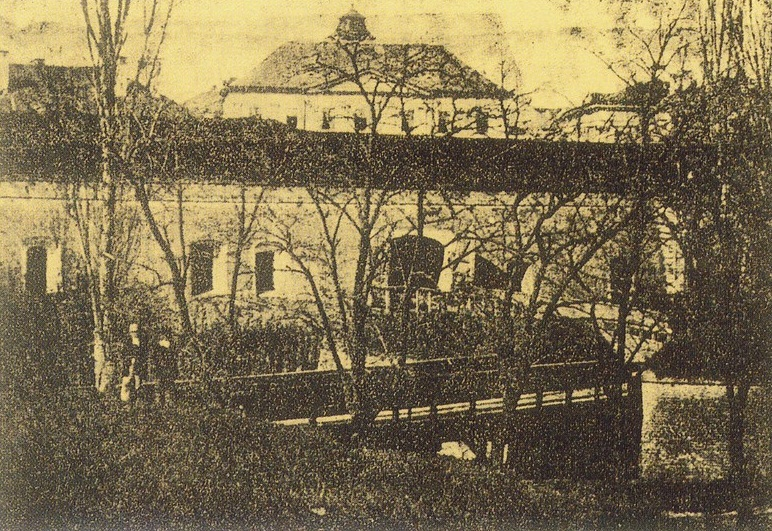
Horse tramway culvert at the Siebenbürger Gate with a wooden bridge over the moat, with the former Mocioni Palace in the background

On Thursday, 8 July 1869, the horse-drawn tramway began operations, following cities like New York City (1832), Montbrison (1839), Paris (1855), Boston (1856), Mexico City (1857), Havana and Santiago de Chile (1858), Rio de Janeiro (1859), Birkenhead (1860), London, Sydney, and Toronto (1861), Geneva (1862), Buenos Aires, Alexandria, Cape Town, Copenhagen, Saint Petersburg, and Valparaíso (1863), Berlin and Vienna (1865), Hamburg and Pest (1866), Buda and Stuttgart (1868), and Brussels (May 1869), Temesvár, with 32,725 inhabitants, was among the first cities worldwide to open a horse-drawn tramway. Like most cities, Timișoara used standard gauge, except for Santiago de Chile, Rio de Janeiro, and Valparaíso (colonial gauge, 1676 mm) and Saint Petersburg (Russian broad gauge, 1524 mm).

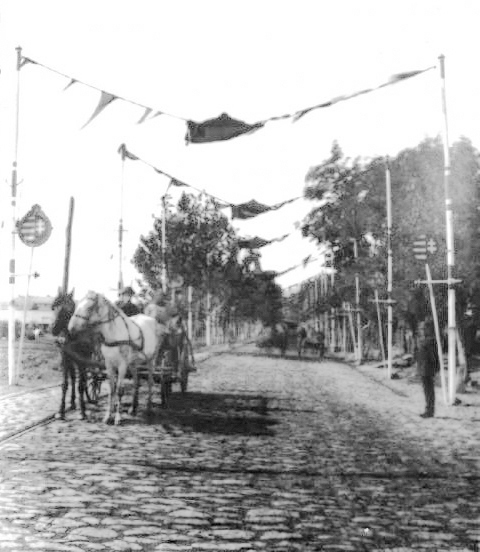
Overland route to the Fabric district, with the inner city in the background

The inner city terminus was on Piața Sfântu Gheorghe (formerly Szent György tér or Sankt-Georgs-Platz), approximately 100 meters east of Piața Libertății and 200 meters south of Piața Unirii. In the Fabric district, the terminus was on Piaţa Romanilor (formerly Piaţa Coronini or Coronini tér), a name adopted in the 1880s. Earlier sources refer to the Zur Königin von England inn (Angol Királynő in Hungarian) at Piaţa Romanilor 1 as the terminus. This initial route, 1,896 meters long, deviated from the modern tram route in two sections, running south of the current alignment.

From Piața Sfântu Gheorghe, the route ran southeast along Strada Enrico Caruso to the main gate of the former Seven Towns Barracks, then northeast along Strada Carol Telbisz—partially built over by the Bega department store in the 1960s—to the junction of Strada Martin Luther and Bulevardul Revoluţiei din 1989, near today's Hotel Continental.

Between the Siebenbürger Gate (Erdélyi kapu, near Hotel Continental) and the entrance to Parcul Poporului (Városliget) in the Fabric district, the route followed Ludwig van Beethoven and Martir Leontina Bânciu streets, crossing the undeveloped Postpalais site. Before the Bega River was canalized, it ran further south, avoiding the need for a tram crossing. Instead, the tram crossed the Holzschwemmkanal, a Bega tributary, about 100 meters south of the Decebal Bridge (completed in 1909), joining the current tram line at the Neptunbad.

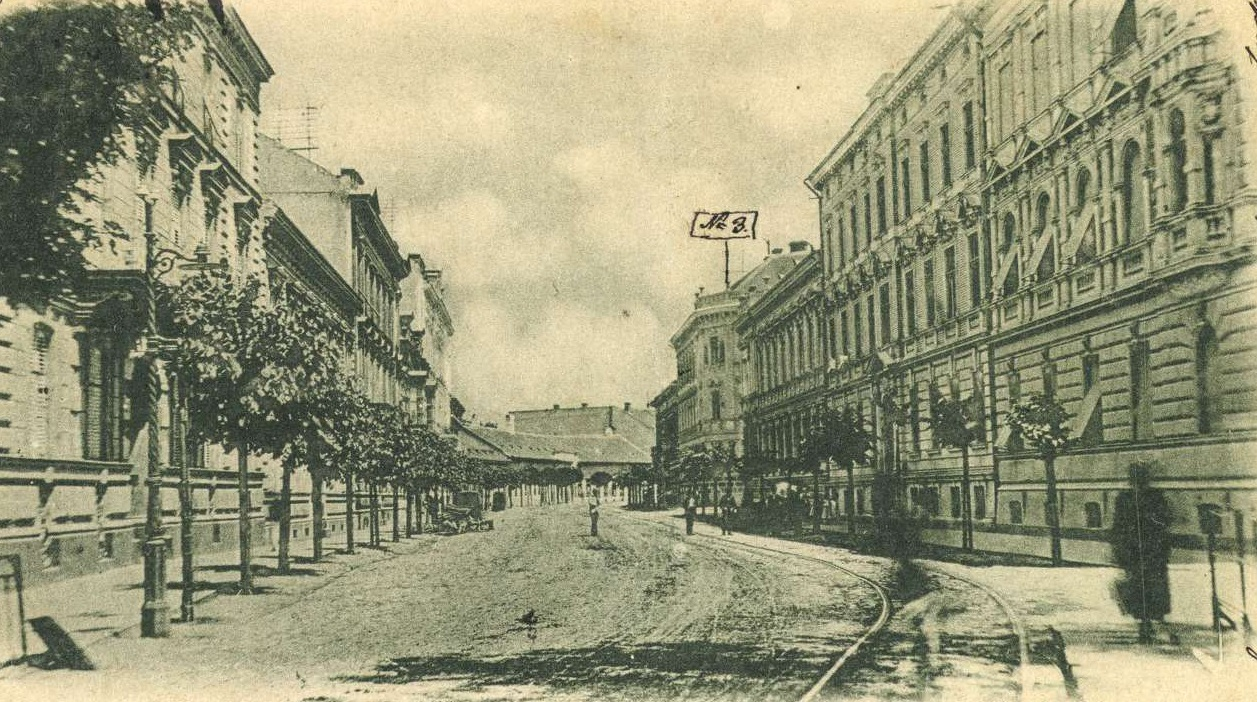
Horse-drawn tram tracks on Andrássy út (now Bulevardul 3 August 1919); in the foreground, the bridge over the mill canal, drained in 1909; in the background, Piaţa Romanilor

The tramway crossed the fortress moat via a wooden bridge and passed through a double-winged railway fortress gate in the city wall. Under a contract signed on 7 September 1868, the tram company was obligated to dismantle the bridge and restore the wall within 24 hours if requested by the military during a siege. For over a kilometre around the fortress, the rails ran through largely undeveloped land, resembling an interurban tramway.

The company initially employed one inspector, six conductors, seven drivers, three track maintenance workers, five-passenger carriages, and 15 pairs of horses, with one carriage and three pairs of horses kept in reserve. Each service used three horses, with two pulling the carriage while the third rested at the route's end.

The tram vehicles featured two classes, a common practice, with an open passage between compartments. On 16 August 1869, a fatal traffic accident occurred near the fortress wall when the last tram to the Fabric district struck a presumably intoxicated pedestrian around 9 p.m.

=== Expansion into Josefstadt (October 1869) ===
On Monday, 25 October 1869, three and a half months after opening, the horse-drawn tramway extended to the Josefstadt district. A second line connected Piața Sfântu Gheorghe to the Wilder Mann Inn (Vad-ember in Hungarian) at the northern end of today's Strada Iancu Văcărescu, at its junction with Splaiul Tudor Vladimirescu. This T-junction on the Bega's left bank served as a temporary terminus, as the bridge to the Josefstadt station (later Bem-híd, now Podul Eroilor) was not yet completed.

The new line, approximately 2.9 kilometres long, shared the existing inner-city infrastructure for the first 100 meters toward the Fabric district. The routes diverged at the main gate of the former Seven Towns Barracks. The Josefstadt line ran via Piața Iancu Huniade and Piața Victoriei, joining the current tram line at the Cathedral of the Holy Three Hierarchs. The fortifications at the Peterwardeiner Gate (Péterváradi kapu) were crossed via a dismantlable wooden bridge and a separate gate. The route then extended about one kilometre through open fields in Josefstadt, resembling an interurban tramway.

The line featured a level crossing with the 1858 Karasjeszenö railway, located where the cathedral now stands. To improve access, the tramway detoured from Păța Alexandru Mocioni via the intersection of Bulevardul 16 Decembrie 1989 and Strada Iancu Văcărescu. Inner-city passengers transferred between the radial lines to the Fabric district and Josefstadt.

==== Extension in the Fabric District (October 1869) ====
On 26 October 1869, the Fabrikstädter line was extended by approximately 650 meters to the Prințul Turcesc (Turkish Prince) stop, formerly Împăratul Turcesc, known during the tramway era as Török Császár in Hungarian and Türkischer Kaiser in German. The terminus was on today's Strada Titu Maiorescu. Unlike the current tram line, the route ran south, crossing Piața Romanilor diagonally and reaching Strada Ștefan cel Mare via a 60-meter private property owned by the tram company at Strada Ștefan cel Mare 22 (conscription number 15). Purchased in 1868 from Krausz for 7,500 gulden, this site was later redeveloped. Near the former Zum Schwarzen Bären inn, the tramway crossed the current tram line at a right angle, slightly north of the brewery, onto public land. It crossed the mill canal again at Piața Aurel Vlaicu (formerly Rózsa tér or Rosenplatz) and followed Strada Titu Maiorescu to the terminus.

=== Extension in Josefstadt (1871) ===
After completion of the elaborately constructed Bem-híd – at that time the first steel bridge over the Bega – the Josefstadt line was extended by approximately 700 metres on Friday, 29 September 1871.[6] This gave Josefstadt station a direct connection to the horse-drawn tramway. The expansion was urgently needed because, with the opening of the line to Arad on 6 April 1871, the station was upgraded from a simple through station to a railway junction. North of the new bridge, the tram ran past the tobacco factory on a direct route to the station, i.e. through Strada Dimitrie Bolintineanu and then through what is now the factory premises of the ELBA company. It then turned right at the freight station into Strada Gării and ended directly in front of the main entrance to the reception building. This marked the completion of the horse-drawn tramway for passenger transport.

=== Plans not implemented ===
Several planned extensions were never implemented or were realized only during electrification in 1899. The city repeatedly urged the tram company to extend the Fabrikstädter line by about 500 meters to Piața Sarmisegetuza (then Malom-tér), but the company deemed it unprofitable. Additionally, a 200-meter extension from Piața Sfântu Gheorghe to Piața Unirii was not pursued.

In autumn 1873, the company received approval for two branch lines from Piața Aurel Vlaicu: one to Podul Dacilor, and another to the intersection of Strada Ștefan cel Mare with Calea Ioan Vidrighiu and Strada Petre Cermena. However, an economic crisis affecting Temesvári Közúti Vaspálya Társaság prevented their construction. Residents of the Fabric district also opposed these routes, citing concerns about narrow streets and unsuitable bridges.

=== Start of freight transport (1872) ===
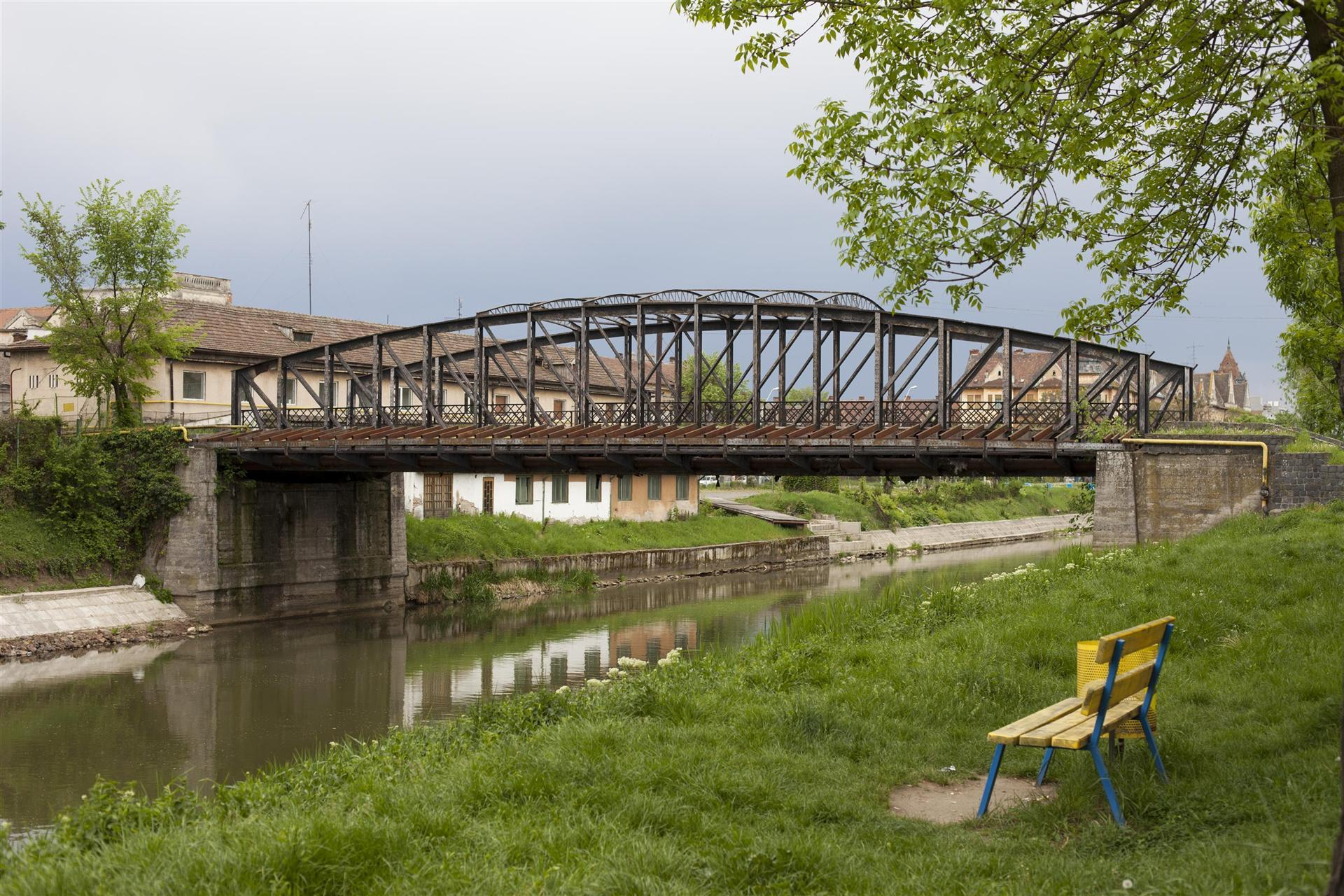
From 1871, horse-drawn tram cars crossed the Bega between the inner city and Josefstadt via this bridge, now the pedestrian bridge about 500 meters downstream

In 1871, the steel Losonczy híd bridge replaced an older wooden bridge, enabling horse-drawn freight transport to begin in May 1872. Although the freight license was obtained initially, it remained unused early on. The 1871 connection to the Josefstadt station increased demand for goods transport, previously limited to luggage. The Timișoreana Brewery in the Fabric district, a key supporter and financial contributor to the tramway, was the primary customer. A railway junction near the Seven Towns Barracks facilitated direct freight trips between the Fabric district and Josefstadt without reversing.

=== Abolition of the Two-Class system (1875) ===
In 1872, the tram company applied to abolish the two-class system in favour of a single fare, proposing smoking and non-smoking compartments. The request was approved on July 10, 1875, with the flat fare effective from July 21, 1875. Smoking compartments were not permitted, and smoking in carriages remained prohibited. To standardize vehicles, during summer months, window panes in half of each carriage were replaced with curtains, resembling summer carriages.

=== Additional level crossings with the railway ===
On October 23, 1876, a new railway line from Temesvár to Karánsebes created two additional level crossings with the Austro-Hungarian State Railways. One was a few meters north of the existing Karasjeszenö crossing, near today's Cathedral of the Holy Three Hierarchs. The second was between the inner city and the Fabric district, at the intersection of Bulevardul Constantin Diaconovici Loga and Strada Ludwig van Beethoven. Both crossings are now defunct, with the railway relocated in 1902 and the electric tram in 1909.

The new line increased congestion near the cathedral, where trains frequently delayed trams and road traffic. Additional railway lines to Buziaș (1896) and Radna (1897), operated by the Magyar Államvasutak (MÁV), further intensified traffic, with up to 40 daily trains causing prolonged closures.

In the 1880s, a fourth crossing was added at the station forecourt, where a siding to the Pannonian steam mill (Pannonische Dampfmühle), opposite the station, intersected the tramway at a right angle.

=== World Exhibition (1891) ===
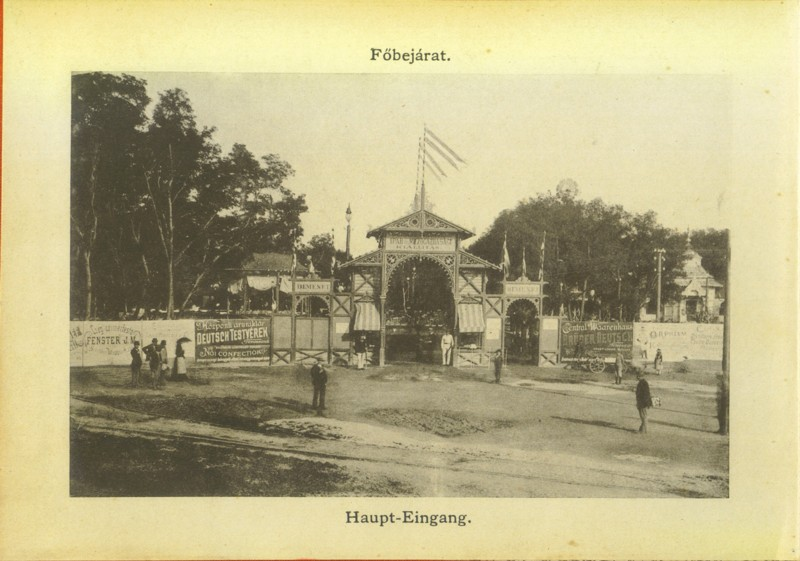
Main entrance to the World Exhibition in Franz Joseph Park, with the horse tram track and passing loop in the foreground

From June 19 to September 30, 1891, Temesvár hosted the Universal Exhibition for Industry and Agriculture, a world exhibition. Held in the newly created Franz Joseph Park, adjacent to the tram line to the Fabric district, the main entrance was at the intersection of Bulevardul Constantin Diaconovici Loga and Strada Ludwig van Beethoven, attracting significant passenger traffic. To accommodate visitors, the company acquired five additional passenger cars, tripling service on the Fabric line when needed, with one car as a reserve. The exhibition led to a record 964,264 passengers in 1891, a figure unmatched until electrification.

=== Competition from Horse-Drawn buses (1894) ===
In 1890, the Alte Mayerhöfe district, renamed Elisabethstadt in 1896, was incorporated into Temesvár. To connect it to the transport network, the city permitted a private entrepreneur to operate horse-drawn omnibuses, competing with the tramway. The company, Temesvár–Majoroki Társaskocsi Részvénytársaság, with 12,000 crowns in the capital, began service on October 24, 1894, between the inner city and Piața Nicolae Bălcescu, the centre of Elisabethstadt. The tramway only served the district's northwestern edge.

On May 27, 1895, the omnibus company was approved to add two lines: one to Josefstadt station and another to Fabrikstadt station. The Fabrikstadt station opened in 1876 on undeveloped land north of Piața Traian and lacked transport connections. The Josefstadt line, however, competed directly with the tramway's southern detour through Josefstadt. Temesvári Közúti Vaspálya Társaság successfully appealed, arguing that omnibus expansion would hinder tramway growth. In June 1895, the city council revoked most approvals, limiting the omnibus to a short route between Piața Romanilor and Gara de Est. The omnibus company, unable to sustain operations, was acquired by the tram company in late 1896, which continued the Fabric route but discontinued the Elisabethstadt line.

=== Track corrections in the Fabric District (1896) and Josefstadt (1897) ===
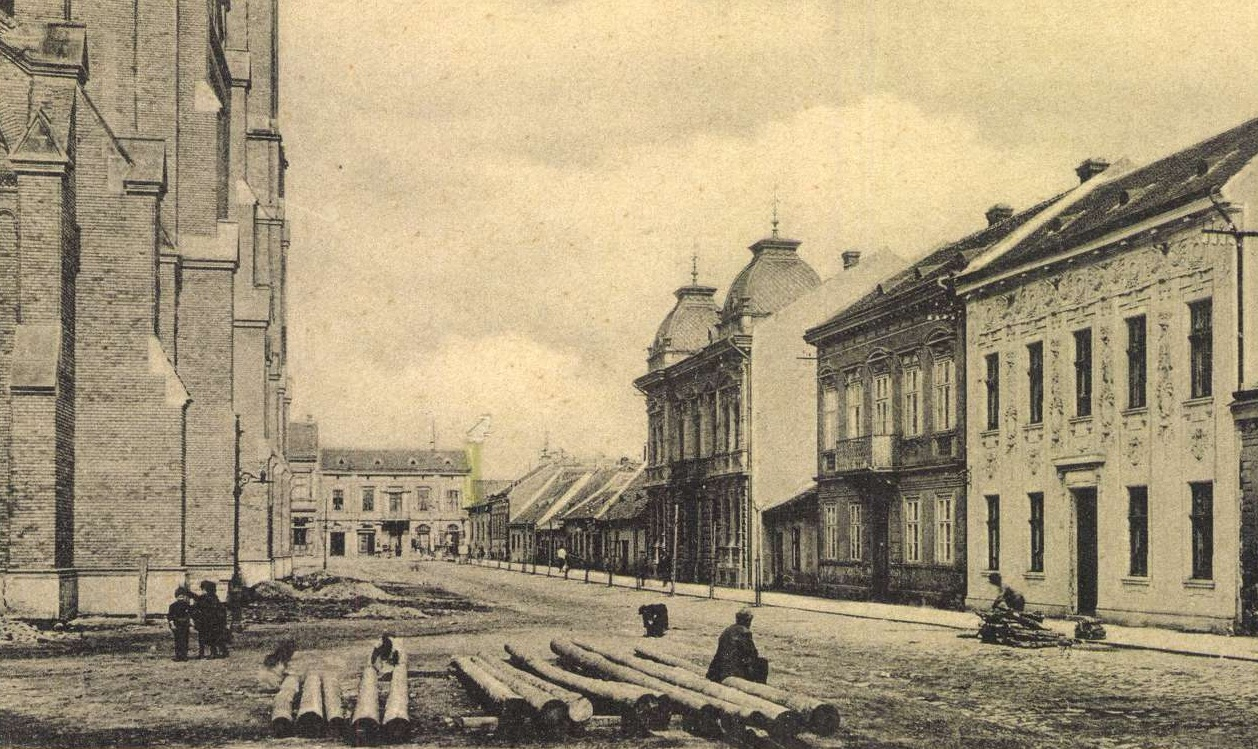
Horse-drawn tram track beside the Millennium Church, used for three years, with the 1896 passing loop in the centre

The construction of the Millennium Church (1896–1901) on Piața Romanilor necessitated a route change in the Fabric district three years before electrification. To clear the construction site, the tramway was rerouted along the northern and eastern sides of the square, extending the route slightly and relocating the passing loop to the eastern side.

The reconstruction of Josefstadt station (1897–1899) prompted changes in the station forecourt. The 1871 terminus, north of today's Strada Gării and accessed via a canal bridge, was removed. The new terminus, used for two years, was positioned in the forecourt's centre, aligned with the city centre route, eliminating the S-curve and canal bridge.

=== Before electrification (1897) ===
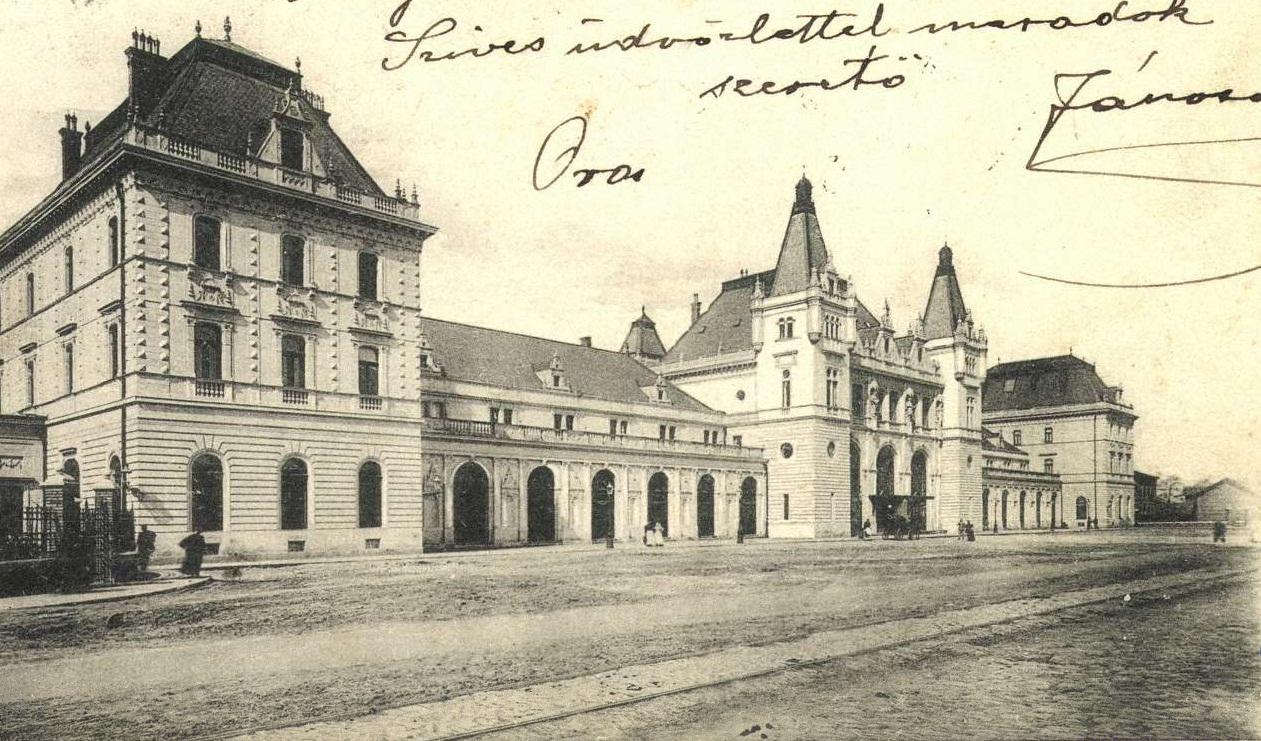
The new terminus opened in 1897 in front of the new station building

After extensive negotiations between the city and the tram company, the Ministry in Budapest granted the electrification license on June 5, 1897. On July 21, 1897, the company renamed itself Temesvári Villamos Városi Vasút Részvénytársaság, or Temeswarer Elektrische-Straßenbahn-Aktiengesellschaft. In addition to upgrading existing lines, the company was primarily tasked with network expansion. Residents of Elisabethstadt, without transport links since the horse-drawn omnibus service ceased in 1896, had long demanded tram connections. A connection to Fabrikstadt station, inadequately served by omnibuses, was equally pressing.

Transport demand had increased significantly, with Temesvár's population nearly doubling to 59,229 by 1900, but horse-drawn trams could only partially meet this demand. By the late 19th century, horse-drawn trams were considered obsolete; electric trams had operated in Budapest since 1887 and in Vienna, the other capital of the Austro-Hungarian Empire, since 1897.

=== Start of electrical operation (1899) ===
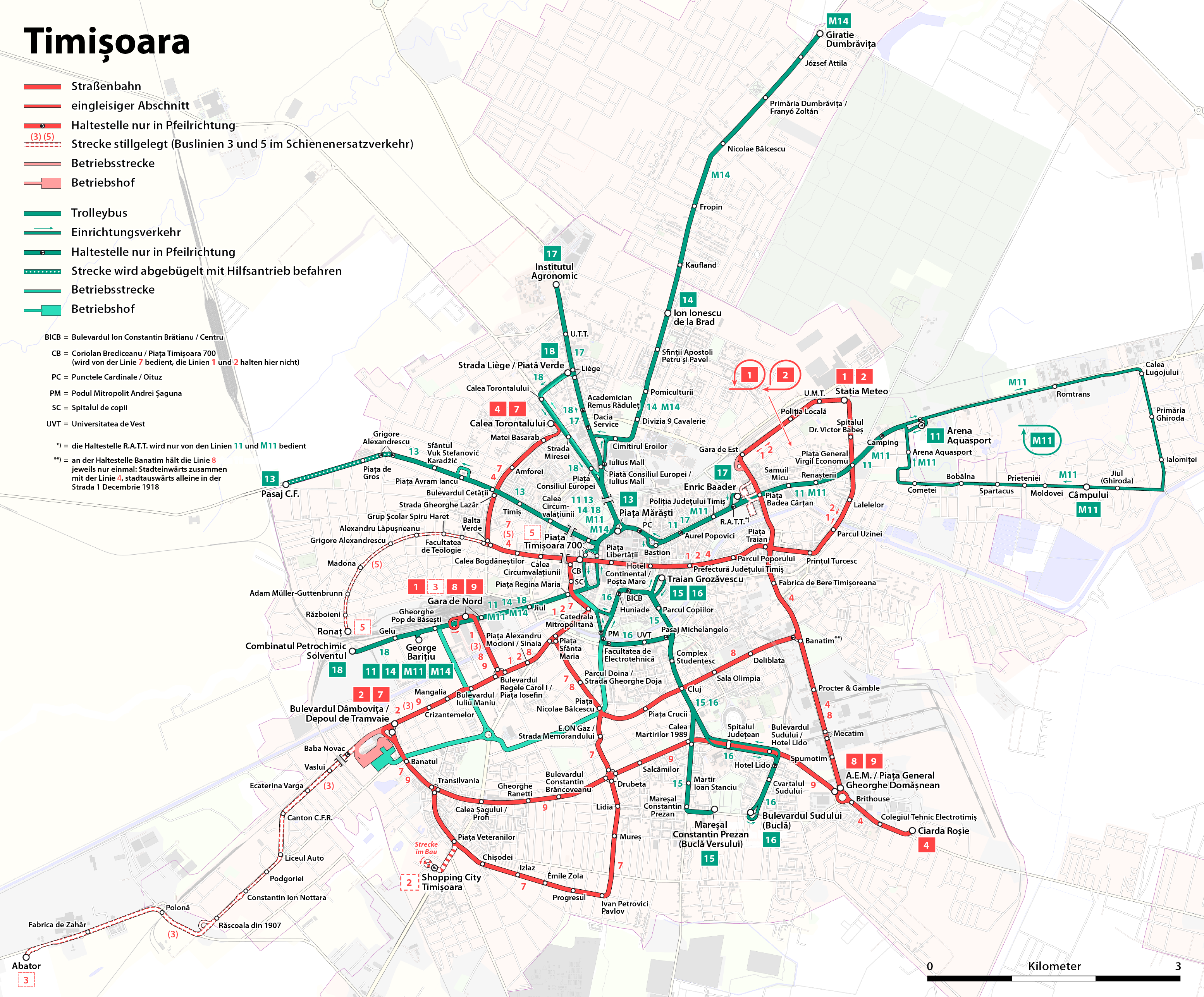
The 1899 network; abandoned horse tramway sections are marked in green

Construction of the new network began in July 1898, expanding from 6.636 kilometres or 6.672 kilometres. Five electric lines (I, II, III, IV, V) replaced the two unnumbered horse-drawn lines. Only two sections—Piața Romanilor to Piața Balaș and the opera house to Piața Alexandru Mocioni, totalling approximately 2.4 kilometres—were directly converted, with these upgraded to double tracks before electrification. Most of the 1899 network consisted of new lines.

The transition significantly boosted transport capacity. In 1898, the horse-drawn tram carried 874,901 passengers, while the electric tram carried 2,397,492 in 1900, over two and a half times more. Despite later route adjustments, the former horse-drawn lines remain the core of Timișoara's tram network, primarily served by lines 1 and 2, with line 1 covering both original termini. Notably, the night service to Josefstadt station continued as a horse-drawn tram until 1904, as the company's power station did not operate at night. Municipalization in 1904 and connection to the municipal electricity works ended horse-drawn operations in Timișoara.

== Operations and infrastructure ==
The horse-drawn railway, including all passing loops, depot tracks, and freight sidings, totalled 7,584 meters after completion. The company primarily used Loubat grooved rails (23 kilograms per meter) on oak sleepers. On two interurban sections, Vignole rails (16 kilograms per meter) were laid on gravel beds with sand filling.

Approximately 400 meters between the Siebenbürger Gate and the intersection of Bulevardul Constantin Diaconovici Loga and Strada Ludwig van Beethoven.Approximately 300 meters between the Peterwardeiner Gate and the former railway crossing near today's cathedral.

Rails, manufactured in Reșița, cost 18 forints per cubic meter. Both lines were single-track; from the inner city, tracks ran on the right toward the Fabric district and the left toward Josefstadt. A 100-meter shared passing loop on Strada Enrico Caruso connected to a four-track interchange at Piața Sfântu Gheorghe, where horses were changed. The Fabrikstädter line used the loop first, followed six minutes later by the Josefstädter line, resulting in a six-minute transfer time and a 45-minute total travel time per direction.

Besides the Strada Enrico Caruso loop, six additional passing loops existed.

On the 2.6-kilometre-long Fabrikstädter branch line:	at the right angle of the intersection of today's Bulevardul Constantin Diaconovici Loga with today's Strada Ludwig van Beethoven, east of the former railway crossing there
On the 2.6-kilometre-long Fabrikstädter branch line:	on Piaţa Romanilor, on the site of today's Millennium Church
On the 3.6-kilometre-long Josefstadt branch:	on Bulevardul 16 Decembrie 1989, between the former railway crossing and Podul Traian
On the 3.6-kilometre-long Josefstadt branch:	on 16 Decembrie 1989 Boulevard, between Alexandru Odobescu Street and Constantin Brâncoveanu Street
On the 3.6-kilometre-long Josefstadt branch:	on Iancu Văcărescu Street, between Regele Carol I Boulevard and Splaiul Tudor Vladimirescu
On the 3.6-kilometre-long Josefstadt branch:	in the area of the double-track terminus on the forecourt of Gara de Nord

The sidings were spaced approximately 950 meters apart and were about 70 meters long, enabling flying crossings. The two lines operated ten trains every 10–12 minutes at an average speed of 9.5 kilometres per hour. The Josefstädter line scheduled six trips (five before the 1871 extension), while the Fabrikstädter line had four trips from the outset. Service began at 6:00 a.m., with the last Fabrikstädter trip departing at 10:00 p.m., connecting to the final Josefstädter carriage in the city centre. A daily night service to Josefstadt station ran at 3:30 a.m., returning at 4:00 a.m., aligning with Budapest trains.

Despite fixed stops in the concession agreement, passengers could request stops by shouting or waving, a common practice on horse-drawn tramways until electrification. During high demand, three extra carriages per line, stationed at Piața Sfântu Gheorghe, reinforced services (e.g., post-theatre trips). These allowed every second Josefstädter service and three-quarters of Fabrikstädter services to be doubled, with extra carriages following regular trains, requiring oncoming trams to wait at sidings. With 21 cars, all services could be doubled, leaving one reserve. The 1891 World Exhibition's five additional carriages enabled the tripling of Fabrikstädter services. Increasing frequency required double-track sections or more loops, which were not built.

== Company premises ==
=== First Depot (1869) ===
In 1869, the city provided a free depot site on the south side of Piața Romanilor (now Piața Romanilor No. 11), at the western edge of the Fabric district on the Seilerwiese. This undeveloped area was bounded by Bulevardul 3 August 1919 (north), Piața Romanilor (east), the Bega (now Strada Joseph Nischbach, south), and the timber flushing canal (now Strada Episcop Joseph Lonovici, west). Replacing the former imperial and royal bedding warehouse, the company built a wooden, three-track carriage shed by late 1869, measuring 51.2 meters long and 20.8 meters wide, accessible via a turntable and housing all 24 carriages.

Stables were initially located in a separate building at Piața Romanilor No. 10 and Strada Ștefan cel Mare No. 20 (Fabric district registration number 16), purchased on March 6, 1869, for 18,500 guilders from Carol Schiller and converted by 1870. The administration rented space in the Lloyd's of London building in the inner city. The depot was temporary, with the city requiring vacation within six weeks if needed. On November 4, 1871, the city demanded the site's return, but the company couldn't comply. Negotiations to purchase the 468-square-fathom site failed, and a court order in the autumn of 1873 forced liquidation. The city built its first power station there in 1884 for electric street lighting.

=== Second Depot (1874) ===
On December 31, 1873, the company purchased a building at Piața Aurel Vlaicu No. 4 (Fabric district registration number 400) from Isabela Schmidt for 22,000 guilders. Located between the Erste Kunstmühl Gesellschaft and the Hotel Rosen, it became the administrative headquarters in 1874. A five-track depot was built in the rear courtyard, accessed via a wide passage gate and a turntable, with a second turntable connecting storage sidings. A blacksmith's workshop opened in 1874, and stables were completed in February 1876.

On October 13, 1875, the company sold the first depot building (registration number 16) for 10,000 guilders, incurring a 6,500-guilder loss. The Piața Aurel Vlaicu depot was abandoned in 1899 during electrification, with operations moving to a site south of Bulevardul Take Ionescu, still in use today. The building was retained, with a new entrance replacing the tram gateway before 2008.

== Tickets and fares ==
A one-way ticket between the Fabric district and the inner city or between the inner city and Josefstadt costs 10 paisa in first class and 8 paisa in second class, with double fares for the full route. After the single-class system was introduced in 1875, the former first-class fare applied universally. Children under 10 and students with valid certificates received half-price tickets from 1875 and 1878, respectively. In 1879, transfer tickets for both lines were introduced at 15 paisa.

Regular passengers and commuters could purchase 50-trip collection cards, 20 per cent cheaper than single tickets but valid for one month. These perforated cards, resembling stamp sheets, had a section removed by the conductor per trip. In 1895, return tickets were introduced at 12 paisa to compete with horse-drawn omnibuses charging 6 paisa per trip.

== Vehicles ==
=== Passenger cars ===
In 1869, the Johann Spiering imperial and royal machine factory and carriage works in Vienna delivered 21 passenger carriages to Temesvár. Five were available at opening, with the rest arriving later that year. Each was drawn by two horses (three in snow). Ten Spiering carriages served as electric tram trailers until 1919.

For the 1891 World Exhibition, five lighter carriages, pulled by one horse, were supplied by the Joh. Weitzer Carriage and Wagon Factory in Graz. These were retired during electrification, and none were preserved.

=== Baggage cars ===
In 1869, Spiering delivered three luggage cars: two closed poggyaszkocsi at 820 forints each and one open poggyaszkocsialváz at 520 forints. Their service duration is unknown, and none survive.

=== Freight cars ===
In May 1872, seven small open flat wagons for freight were purchased from the Maschinen- und Waggon-Fabriks-Aktiengesellschaft Simmering, used until electrification in 1899.
