= Modoș Bridge, Timișoara =

Modoș Bridge Podul Modoș
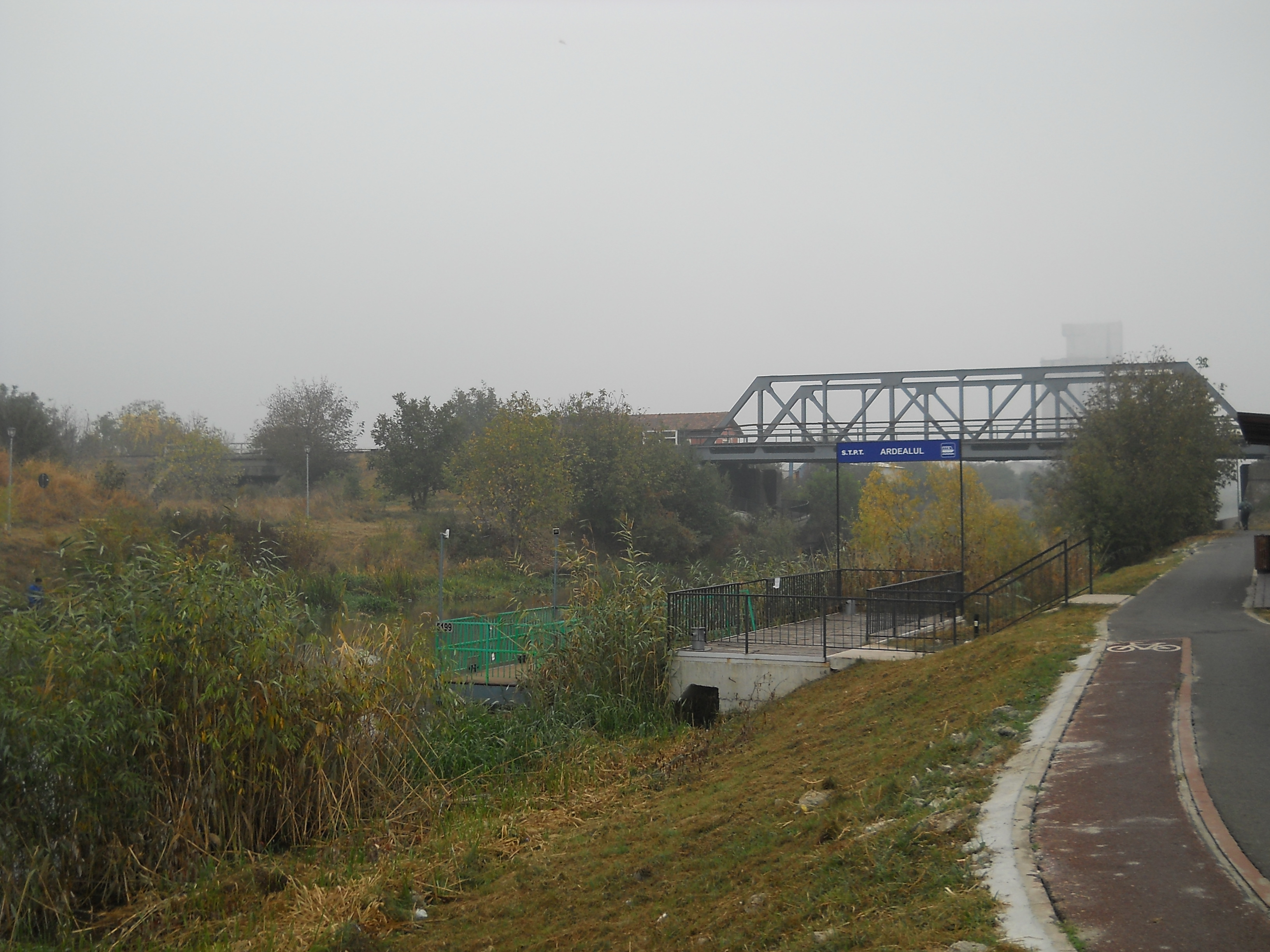
- Coordinates: 45°44′21″N 21°11′9″E
- Carries: Railway tracks
- Crosses: Bega Canal
- Locale: Timișoara, Romania
- Followed by: Iuliu Maniu Bridge

Characteristics
- Design: Railway bridge
- Total length: 35 m (115 ft)
- Width: 11 m (36 ft)

Rail characteristics
- No. of tracks: 2

History
- Built: 1897
- Rebuilt: 1980

Modoș Bridge (Romanian: Podul Modoș) is located in the western Romanian city of Timișoara. It spans the Bega River at the western edge of the southern Iosefin district and extends into the Solventul Industrial Zone. It is 35 meters long, 11 meters wide, and has two tracks.

The iron-framed bridge was named after the line leading to the village of Modoș (now Jaša Tomić), as it was originally built for this purpose.

== History ==
Opened in 1897, the Modoș Bridge is currently the only railway bridge spanning the Bega Canal in Timișoara, linking the city with Stamora Moravița. Initially built for the 53-kilometer Timișoara–Modoș railway (now Jaša Tomić), it became a key part of the Timișoara–Baziaș railway after the section passing through Timișoara's center was dismantled on 1 December 1932, redirecting all trains to the Modoș Bridge. As traffic over the bridge grew significantly, the decision was made to double the railway line in 1935, making the Modoș Bridge the second double-track railway bridge in Romania. In 1980, the original bridge was replaced by the current structure, which continues to serve as the route for trains connecting Timișoara to Oravița and Reșița.

The bridge gained notoriety due to numerous suicides committed there.
