= General Ion Dragalina Bridge, Timișoara =

General Ion Dragalina Bridge Podul General Ion Dragalina
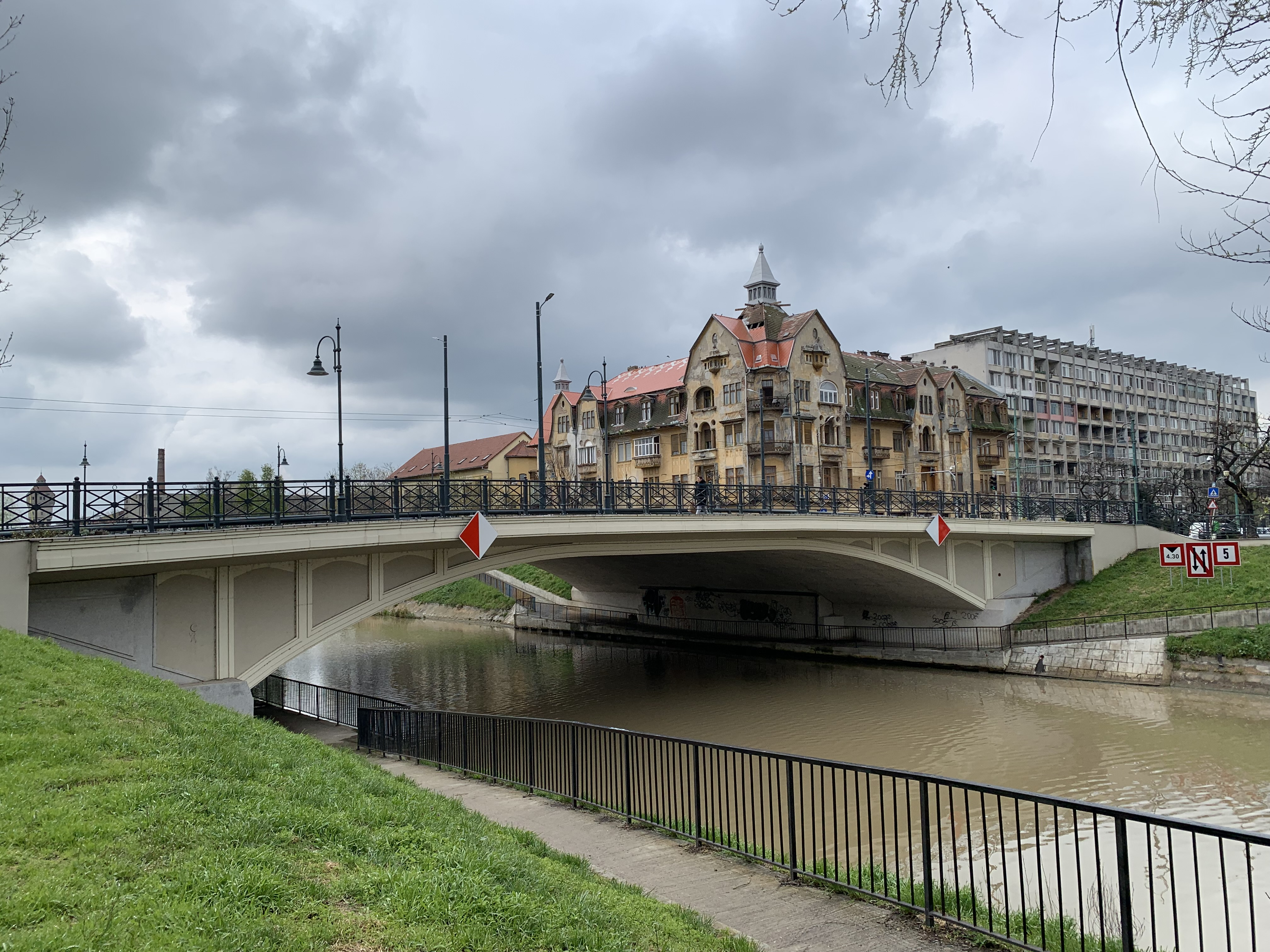
- Coordinates: 45°44′50″N 21°12′34″E
- Carries: Trams, motor vehicles, pedestrians, bicycles
- Crosses: Bega Canal
- Locale: Timișoara, Romania
- Other name(s): Stephen the Great Bridge; Franz Joseph Bridge
- Preceded by: Heroes' Bridge
- Followed by: Iron Bridge

Characteristics
- Width: 50 m (164 ft)
- Longest span: 32 m (105 ft)

History
- Engineering design by: Ioan Polen
- Construction start: 1956
- Construction end: 1958

General Ion Dragalina Bridge (Romanian: Podul General Ion Dragalina), formerly Stephen the Great Bridge, is a bridge in the western Romanian city of Timișoara. It is located in the Iosefin district and crosses the Bega River. As part of General Ion Dragalina Boulevard, it connects the center of Iosefin with Timișoara North railway station.

It spans 32 meters and has a width of 50 meters, with 12 meters designated for the roadway. Currently, it is traversed by a two-way tram line. The structure is supported by beams resting on consoles and features a reinforced concrete superstructure and a concrete foundation.

== Name ==
In the era of the Kingdom of Hungary, the bridge was originally known as Horgony híd, or Podul Ancora de Aur in Romanian, which translates to "Bridge to the Golden Anchor." The name originates from its proximity to the Anchor Palace, built in 1902 by Aladár Kudelich and Johanna Sailer. The palace, which featured a park, also housed a restaurant and brewery named the Golden Anchor. After Timișoara became part of Romania in 1919, the bridge was given its current name. Locally, it is also referred to as Podul de la Gară, meaning "Station Bridge."

== History ==
=== Wooden bridge ===
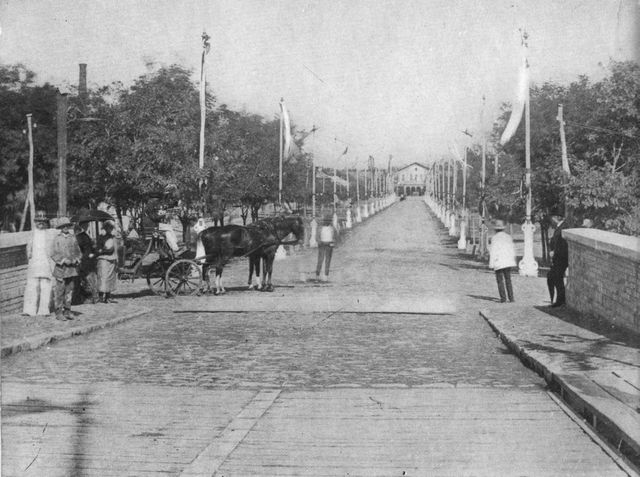
The northern end of the old 19th-century wooden bridge, with Gara de Nord in the background

By the 1880s, the old wooden bridge to the train station had deteriorated and was no longer sufficient for its purpose. As a result, in 1889, the city council chose to construct a metal bridge. Metal bridges had become quite common by then, with the city's first ones having been built in 1870 and 1871.

=== Steel bridge ===
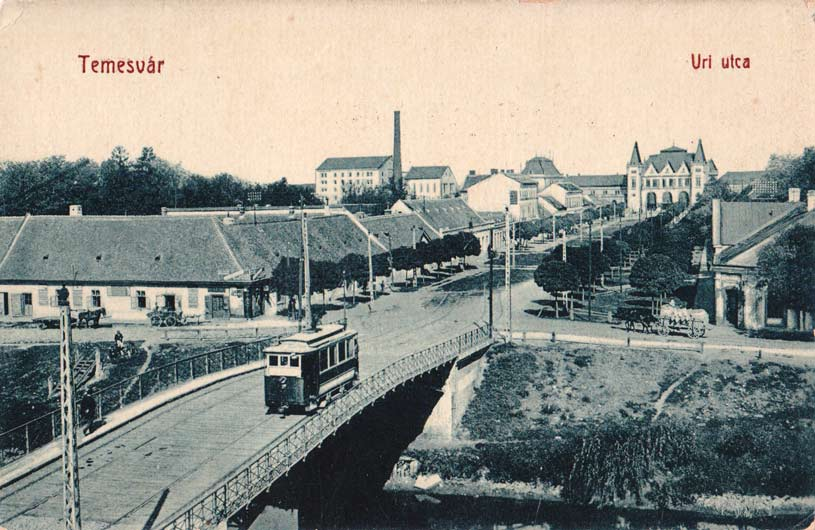
Tram on the steel bridge opened in 1891

In 1890, a public tender was issued for replacing the wooden bridge, and the contract was granted to the Reșița Railway Company, led by engineer Henrik Reiber. The Reiber family had constructed several significant buildings in the city, with the Dicasterial Palace being the most notable. However, due to bureaucratic delays, the bridge's construction was postponed. The steel bridge was ultimately finished in 1891, featuring a 30-meter opening, a 5.6-meter-wide roadway, and two pedestrian walkways, each 1.5 meters wide. It was officially opened during the South Hungarian Industrial and Agricultural Exhibition held in Timișoara. With Emperor Franz Joseph in attendance, it was subsequently referred to as the Franz Joseph Bridge.

In 1899, with the introduction of the electric tramway, the bridge had to be modified to accommodate the new conditions. As a result, it was expanded from five arches to seven.

=== Concrete bridge ===
In 1930, the 19th-century steel bridge was slated for demolition due to signs of wear and tear. By 1939, the bridge had deteriorated to the point that it was closed to private traffic, though trams continued to use it. In 1940, engineer Ioan Polen proposed plans for a new bridge, but the project was delayed by World War II. The old bridge was finally demolished in 1956, and construction of the current concrete bridge was completed by 1958, during which tram service was temporarily suspended. The metal components were melted down, leaving no trace of the original bridge.
