= Iuliu Maniu Bridge, Timișoara =

Iuliu Maniu Bridge Podul Iuliu Maniu
- Coordinates: 45°44′45″N 21°12′18″E
- Carries: Trolleybuses, motor vehicles, pedestrians, bicycles
- Crosses: Bega Canal
- Locale: Timișoara, Romania
- Other name(s): Labor Bridge; Royal Bridge
- Preceded by: Modoș Bridge
- Followed by: Heroes' Bridge

Characteristics
- Total length: 69.85 m (229 ft)

History
- Built: 1913
- Rebuilt: 1978

Location
- Interactive map of Iuliu Maniu Bridge

Iuliu Maniu Bridge (Romanian: Podul Iuliu Maniu) is located in the western Romanian city of Timișoara and crosses the Bega River in the Iosefin district. It carries private motorized traffic and trolleybuses, connecting Calea Șagului—an important commercial and transit artery, with Gării Street, which ensures access to the central area and railway transport hubs. It is named after the Romanian politician Iuliu Maniu (1873–1953).

Other names for the bridge are Podul de la Autogară (Bus Station Bridge), Podul de la Fabrica de Tutun (Tobacco Factory Bridge), and Podul Regal (Royal Bridge) in Romanian, as well as Király híd in Hungarian and Königsbrücke in German. Until 2016, it was called Podul Muncii (Labor Bridge).

== History ==
The bridge was originally constructed from wood, with its most recent repair occurring in 1898. At that point, the bridge supports were positioned in the riverbed, making navigation on the Bega Canal challenging.

In 1913, the bridge was replaced with a metal structure that repurposed elements from the one on the Suboleasa Canal in the Fabric district. Originally situated between the old Turul shoe factory and the cemetery on Calea Buziașului, the bridge was dismantled following the excavation of the new riverbed and then reconstructed in the Iosefin district. During this period, the bridge came to be known as the Royal Bridge (Három Király híd or Three Kings Bridge).

The structure was painted in 1923, reinforced in 1936, and again in 1968. It was rebuilt in 1978 using prestressed reinforced concrete and measures 69.85 meters in length.

Due to the damage to the resistance structure and the degradation of the ramps, access stairs, and superstructure, Timișoara City Hall proposed the demolition and partial reconstruction of the bridge. Rehabilitation works began in February 2026 and include, among other things, strengthening the load-bearing structure and completely replacing the superstructure with a mixed steel-concrete structure.

== Specifications ==
The Iuliu Maniu Bridge is a slab bridge constructed in segments with prefabricated voided slabs. It has a total length of 69.85 meters, featuring a central span of 32.1 meters over the Bega River and two equal side spans of 18.88 meters each. These spans facilitate the crossing over Splaiul Nicolae Titulescu via the Iuliu Maniu Square access ramp and over Splaiul Tudor Vladimirescu via the Gării Street access ramp.

The Iuliu Maniu Bridge features two access ramps of considerable length. The Iuliu Maniu ramp extends 117 meters and terminates with a 7-meter-long section distinguished by a notable architectural design, while the Gării ramp measures 119 meters. Consequently, the total length of the bridge amounts to 305.85 meters, including the lengths of both access ramps leading to the main bridge structure. Along both sides of each access ramp, and throughout their entire length, dedicated lanes accommodate vehicular traffic, pedestrian movement, and a trolleybus line, ensuring connectivity from Iuliu Maniu Boulevard to Splaiul Nicolae Titulescu and Splaiul Tudor Vladimirescu.
