= Iron Bridge, Timișoara =

Iron Bridge Podul de Fier
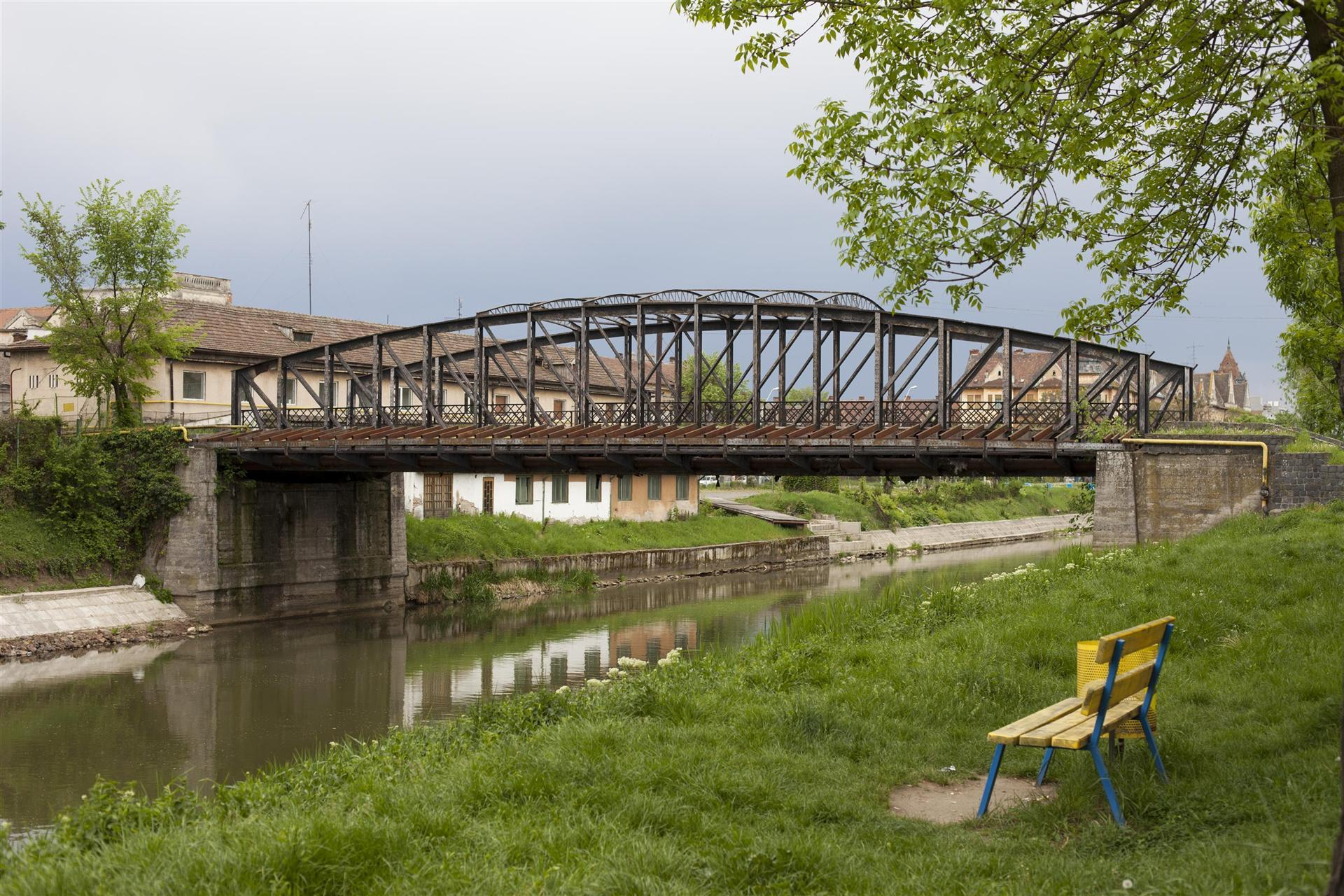
- Coordinates: 45°44′56″N 21°12′52″E
- Crosses: Bega Canal
- Locale: Timișoara, Romania
- Other name: Metal Bridge
- Preceded by: General Ion Dragalina Bridge
- Followed by: Mary Bridge

Characteristics
- Design: Pedestrian bridge
- Total length: 40 m (131 ft)
- Width: 7 m (23 ft)
- Longest span: 32.8 m (108 ft)
- Clearance above: 4.5 m (15 ft)
- Clearance below: 5 m (16 ft)

History
- Constructed by: Timișoara City Hall; Austro-Hungarian Railway Company
- Construction cost: Kr. 70,000
- Opened: 1917

Location
- Interactive map of Iron Bridge

The Iron Bridge (Romanian: Podul de Fier; Hungarian: Közötti híd; German: Eisenbrücke), also known as the Metal Bridge, is the name of a pedestrian bridge in Timișoara, Romania, which crosses the Bega Canal between Ady Endre and Andrei Mureșanu streets.

== History ==
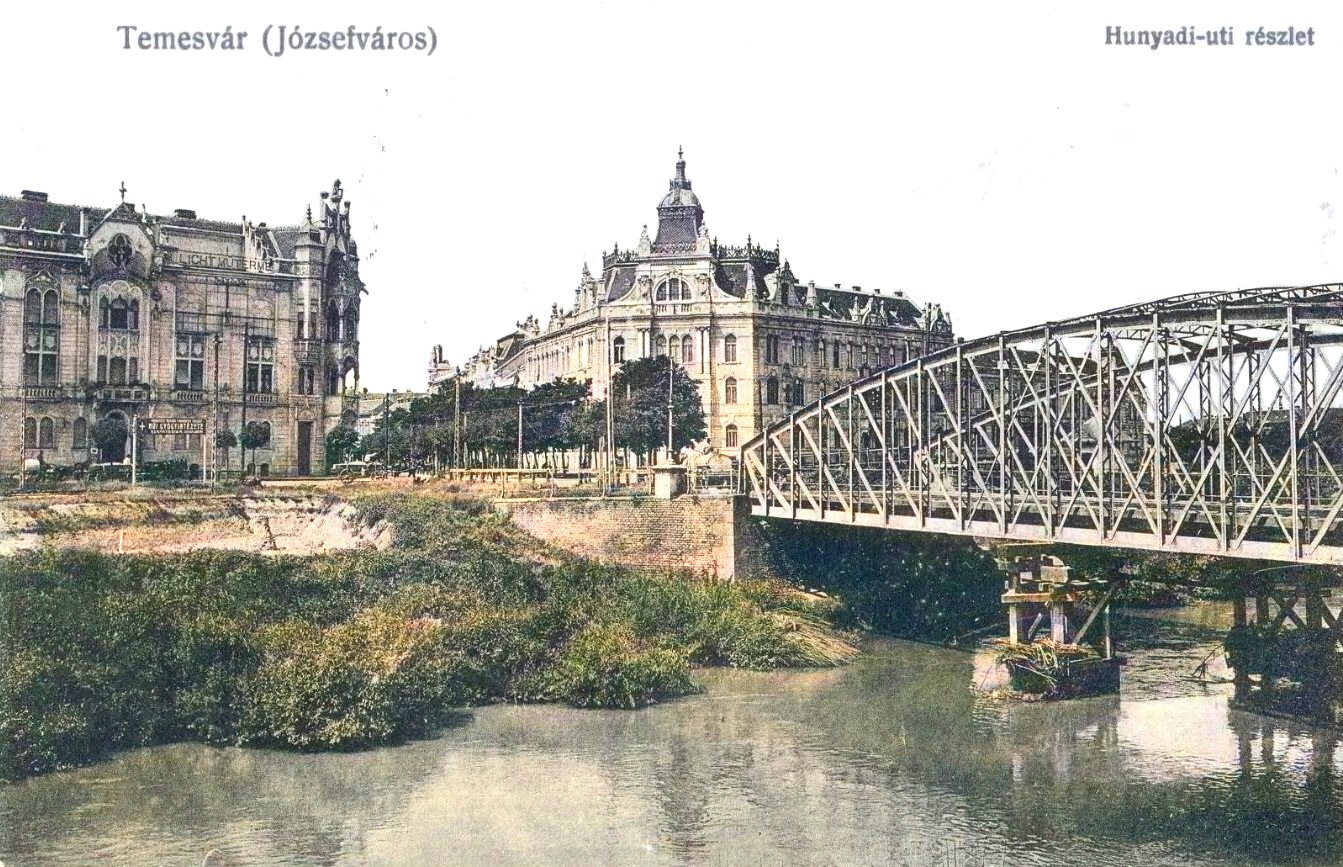
The Iron Bridge at the entrance to Iosefin

Before 1870, there were no solid bridges over the Bega River for a distance of over a kilometer, except for two: the Bishop's Bridge (now located next to Michael the Brave Boulevard), which connected the fortress to Maierele Vechi (the area of present-day Nicolae Bălcescu Square), and the Fabric railway station bridge (now General Ion Dragalina Bridge). Between the Peterwardein Gate of the fortress and the Maierele Noi neighborhood (modern-day Iosefin), only a wooden bridge existed. At the initiative of Mayor János Török, the construction of metal bridges across the Bega River began in 1870–1871.

The existing metal bridge was initially constructed on the location of the present-day Mary Bridge, which was formerly known as Hunyadi híd (Hunyadi Bridge). In 1898, its structure was strengthened to accommodate the added weight of electric trams, which were introduced at that time.

In 1911, it was decided to replace the metal bridge with a reinforced concrete one, better suited for the main connection between the Cetate and Iosefin neighborhoods. Additionally, the metal superstructure of the bridge was to be reused at another location. The bridge was dismantled in March–April 1913 by the Austro-Hungarian Railway Company in Reșița. The structure was then transported about 500 meters downstream, where it was stored on the bank, to be placed between Török utca (Turkish Street, now Ady Endre Street) and Nap utca (Sun Street, now Andrei Mureșanu Street). The bridge was to be named Losonczy híd (Losonczy Bridge), in honor of István Losonczy, the commander of the Timișoara Fortress during the Turkish sieges of 1551–1552. At this place the crossing was made with a raft, which belonged to M. Heim.

The construction of the bridge involved building a concrete infrastructure on the banks, which was designed by engineer Károly Lád from the city hall's technical service. The city hall carried out the work independently until 31 October 1914. However, due to the outbreak of World War I, the project was halted and resumed in August 1916, with completion on 30 November. The Railway Company installed the metal superstructure in 1917.

Since the Chain Factory was nearby, the bridge was known as the Chain Factory Bridge. In the meantime, the factory having been demolished, the bridge is also known as the Iron Bridge.

== Description ==
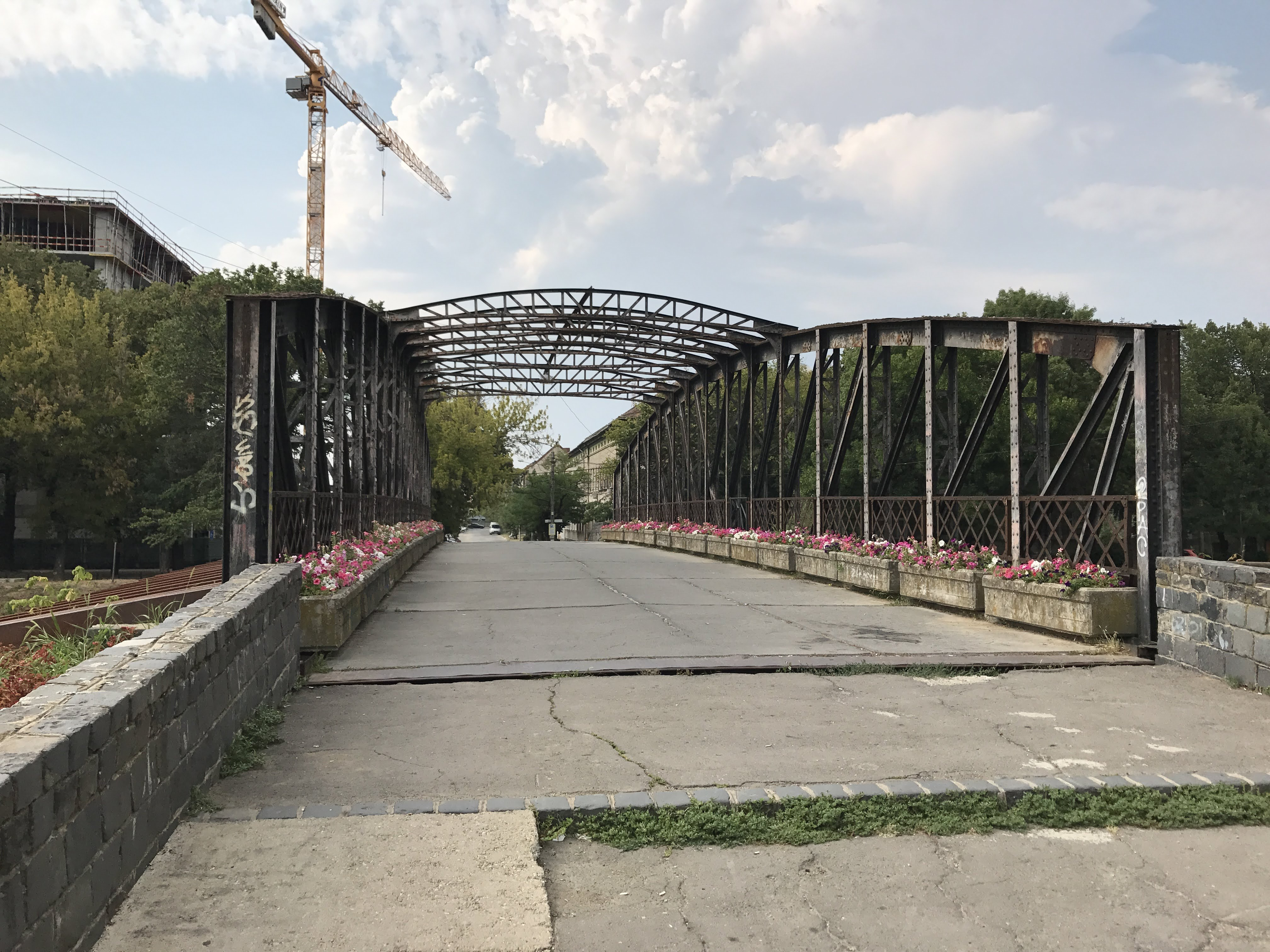
Construction details

The metal superstructure design is a standard one, created by engineer Robert Tóth from the Austro-Hungarian Railway Company in Reșița. The bridge features a simply supported steel truss girder with parabolic sides and a low running track. The deck is supported by nine beams, and the components are joined by riveting. The bridge has a total length of 40 meters and a span of 32.8 meters, with a roadway width of 7 meters. Its original weight was 120 tons.

The bridge was constructed at a considerable height to provide the necessary clearance for navigation. To allow vehicle access, ramps were required on Ady Endre and Andrei Mureșanu streets. However, these ramps were quite narrow, and their construction would have resulted in the burial of riverside residents' houses, which they opposed. As a result, the bridge can only be accessed by steps from both sides, making it a pedestrian bridge. In 1929, with commercial vessel navigation on the Bega River having ceased, the city hall attempted to lower the bridge deck by 1.5 meters, but the request was denied, despite the city's promise to raise the bridge again if navigation resumed. Consequently, the original 2-meter-wide pedestrian sidewalks were removed, and the structure now supports pipes in that area. The situation remains unchanged to this day.

== Legend ==
In the 1970s, a legend emerged, even in the media, claiming that the bridge was designed and constructed by Gustave Eiffel and referred to as the Eiffel Bridge. This may have been a mix-up with another metal bridge known as the Eiffel Bridge, or due to confusion with the Szeged Belvárosi Bridge, which was built in Reșița and indeed designed by Eiffel. However, an analysis of the plans debunked this legend.
