= Mary Bridge, Timișoara =

Mary Bridge Podul Maria
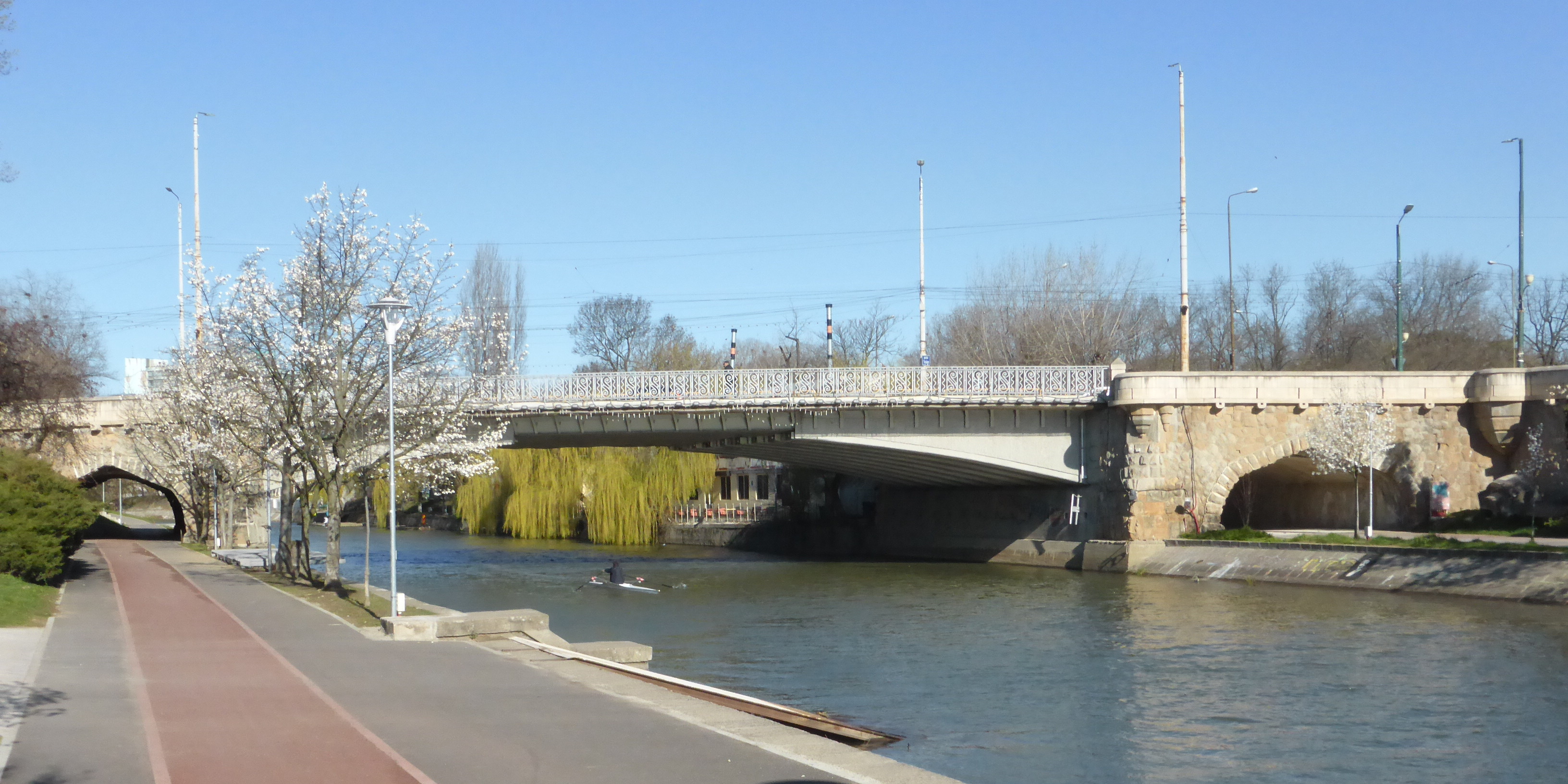
- Coordinates: 45°44′59″N 21°13′15″E
- Carries: Trams, motor vehicles, pedestrians, bicycles
- Crosses: Bega Canal
- Locale: Timișoara, Romania
- Other name(s): Trajan Bridge; Hunyadi Bridge
- Preceded by: Iron Bridge
- Followed by: Michael the Brave Bridge

Characteristics
- Total length: 40 m (131 ft)
- Width: 32.8 m (108 ft)

History
- Architect: Elemér Wachtel
- Engineering design by: Károly Lád
- Construction start: 1913
- Construction end: 1916
- Opened: 1916 (pedestrians); 1917 (motor vehicles); 1918 (tram)

Mary Bridge (Romanian: Podul Maria), formerly Trajan Bridge and Hunyadi Bridge, is a bridge in the western Romanian city of Timișoara, crossing the Bega River. It connects the Cetate district with the Iosefin district. In the immediate vicinity are the Water Palace and the Metropolitan Cathedral.

The bridge is 32.8 meters wide and 40 meters long. The tram tracks are seven meters wide and both sidewalks are two meters wide.

== Name ==
The 1849 city map lists the bridge as the Great Bridge. Following the Austro-Hungarian Compromise of 1867, it was initially named Losonczy híd, after István Losonczy, the last defender of the local fortress before its capture by the Ottoman Empire in 1552. The name was later changed to Hunyadi híd in honor of Hungarian statesman and military leader John Hunyadi. Similarly, the road connecting the inner city (Cetate) and Iosefin was also named Hunyadi utca. After Timișoara came under Romanian control in 1919, the bridge was renamed Trajan Bridge, after the Roman Emperor Trajan.

In 2016, the Timișoara City Council decided to rename the bridge to Podul Maria.

== History ==
=== Wooden bridge ===
The initial bridge on the site of today's Mary Bridge was a wooden structure that linked the Peterwardein Gate to Iosefin. By the late 19th century, this bridge had deteriorated significantly and urgently required replacement, particularly because it was also used by the horse-drawn tramway, which had been extended to Iosefin on 25 October 1869.

=== Steel bridge ===
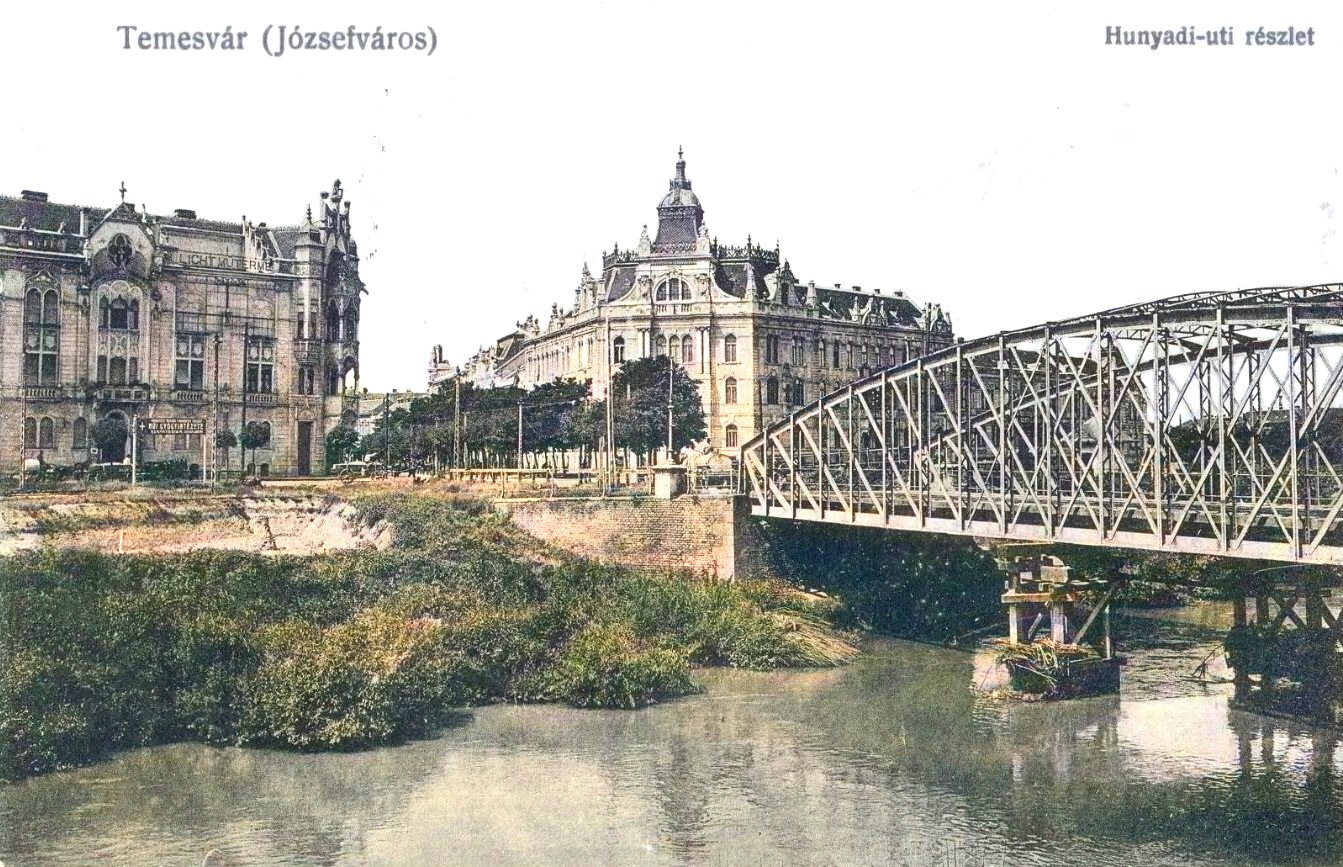
Detailed view of the steel structure from 1870–1871

A steel truss bridge was constructed between 1870 and 1871 to replace the deteriorating wooden bridge. The bridge's metal structure was supplied by the Reșița Ironworks' bridge factory, where it was manufactured. This bridge was the city's second steel bridge, alongside Bem híd, which also opened in the same year. A notable feature of the steel bridge was its asymmetry, with a single-sided pedestrian walkway on the west side.

When the electric tramway was introduced in 1899, the 1871 steel bridge needed reinforcement, which included the addition of two supporting pillars. The tramway company, then known as Temesvári Villamos Városi Vasút Részvénytársaság, covered a quarter of the project's cost.

=== Concrete bridge ===
The construction of the current concrete bridge leading to Iosefin began in March 1913. However, progress was slow during World War I, with the bridge's load test conducted between 14 and 18 December 1915. The bridge was opened to pedestrians on 1 January 1916, and opened for road traffic in 1917. It wasn't until November 1918 that the tram was finally rerouted from the temporary bridge, which had been in use since November 1912, to the permanent route. The old 120-ton steel bridge, however, was repurposed in 1915 as a pedestrian bridge about 500 meters downstream, now known as Podul de Fier.

After World War II, the bridge was modernized and is now the widest of the city's older bridges.

== Architecture ==
The bridge's design is straightforward, with the upper section reflecting the early phase of the Art Deco style. The final version of the bridge lacked the towers, galleries, and decorative features outlined in the consolidation and reconstruction plans.
