= Timișoara metropolitan area =

Timișoara metropolitan area Zona metropolitană Timișoara
- Metropolitan area
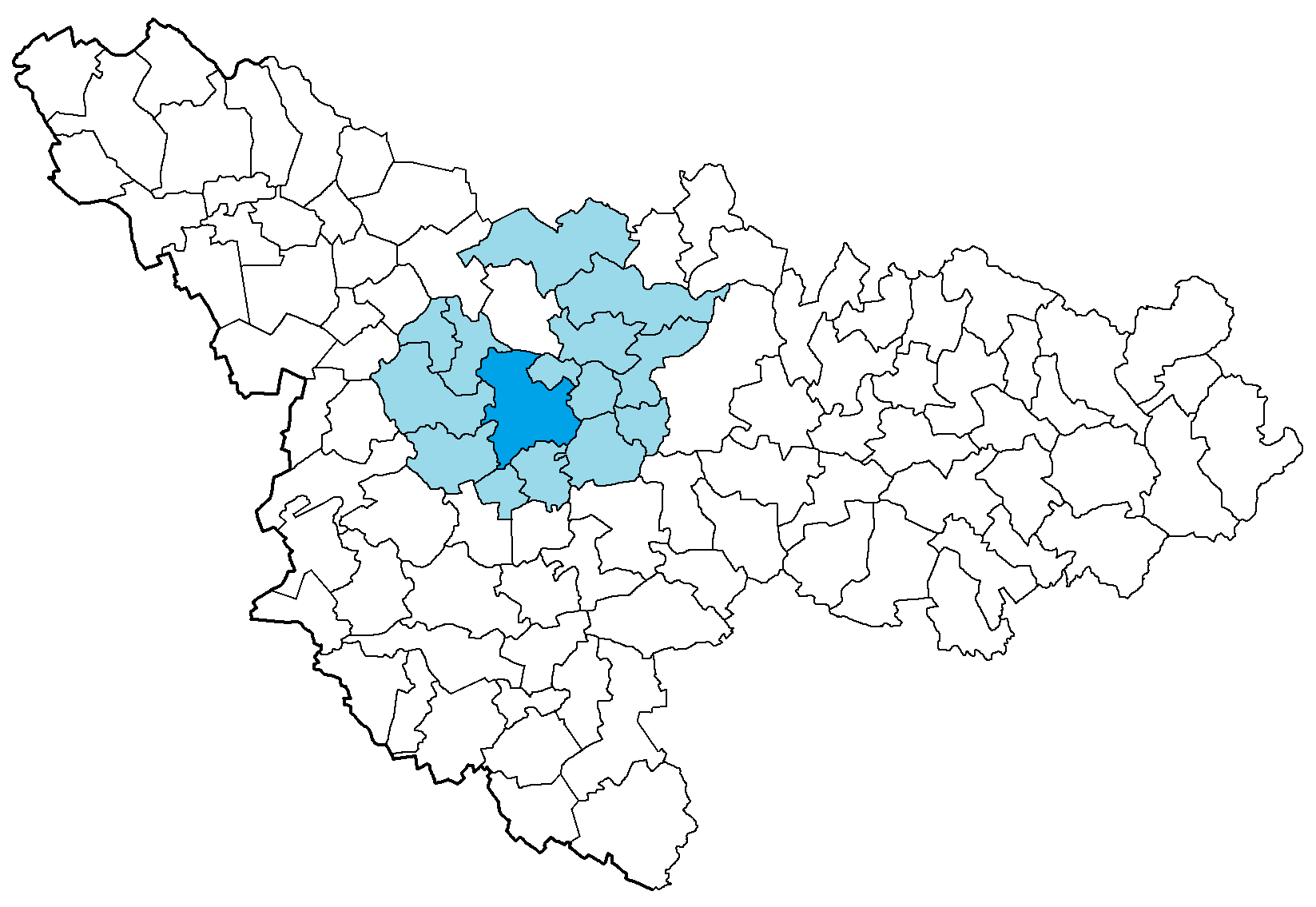
- Country: Romania
- Development region: West
- County: Timiș
- Component LAUs: Cities: Timișoara; Communes: Becicherecu Mic, Bucovăț, Dudeștii Noi, Dumbrăvița, Ghiroda, Giarmata, Giroc, Moșnița Nouă, Orțișoara, Pișchia, Remetea Mare, Săcălaz, Sânmihaiu Român, Șag
- Established: 2008

Area
  - Metro: 1,079.54 km^{2} (416.81 sq mi)

Population (2021 census)
  - Metropolitan area: 468,430
  - Density: 341/km^{2} (880/sq mi)
- Website: adi-pct.ro

The Timișoara metropolitan area is a metropolitan area in Timiș County, which includes Timișoara and 14 surrounding communes. It is located in the westernmost part of Romania, at the gateway of the Schengen free-movement Area toward the Occident. It was legally established in 2008 as an inter-community development association and is a member of the Federation of Metropolitan Areas and Urban Agglomerations in Romania (FZMAUR).

== History ==
The first attempts to create a metropolitan area appeared in 1999–2000, when Timișoara and six peri-urban communes in the first ring surrounding the city (Dumbrăvița, Ghiroda, Giroc, Moșnița Nouă, Săcălaz and Sânmihaiu Român) entered into a local partnership. The result of this partnership was the elaboration of a medium- and long-term "strategic concept of economic and social development". In 2004, Timiș County Council made a decision to establish the first Metropolitan Consultative Council.

The delimitation of the area of influence was approved by HCL no. 387/2008.

== Geography ==
The total area on which the Timișoara metropolitan area extends is 1,079.54 km^{2} – of which 129.27 km^{2} represent the administrative territory of Timișoara, and 950.27 km^{2} the area of influence of the city – occupying about 3.4% of the West development region and about 12.5% of Timiș County.

== Administration ==
The Timișoara metropolitan area is administered by the Timișoara Growth Pole Intercommunity Development Association, led by a General Assembly, a Board of Directors and a General Manager. The General Assembly is the supreme governing body, composed of all members of the Association. The president of the Association is the mayor of Timișoara. The total number of representatives in the General Assembly is 31 members. The Board of Directors is the executive governing body of the Association, composed of the president of the Association and two members appointed by the General Assembly for a period of two years.

=== Subdivisions ===
The Timișoara metropolitan area includes an urban centre (Timișoara) and its area of influence, i.e. 14 communes (Becicherecu Mic, Bucovăț, Dudeștii Noi, Dumbrăvița, Ghiroda, Giarmata, Giroc, Moșnița Nouă, Orțișoara, Pișchia, Remetea Mare, Săcălaz, Sânmihaiu Român and Șag) with 35 villages.

Name	Population (2018 est.)	Area (km^{2})	Density (/km^{2})
Timișoara	330,209	129.27	2,554
Becicherecu Mic	3,207	46.65	69
Bucovăț	1,894	32.52	58
Dudeștii Noi	3,509	53.93	65
Dumbrăvița	10,984	18.99	578
Ghiroda	7,188	34.13	211
Giarmata	7,469	71.51	104
Giroc	14,037	52.77	266
Moșnița Nouă	9,095	68.87	132
Orțișoara	4,655	145.63	32
Pișchia	3,165	123.61	26
Remetea Mare	2,639	72.89	36
Săcălaz	9,314	119.49	78
Sânmihaiu Român	7,685	75.26	102
Șag	3,631	34.02	107
Total	418,681	1,079.54	388

Given the accentuated polarization of the area and the continuous expansion of Timișoara and its suburbs, it was proposed to extend the metropolitan area with the following subdivisions:

- in the south – the communes of Liebling, Parța, Pădureni and Sacoșu Turcesc (possibly also Peciu Nou);
- in the east – the commune of Chevereșu Mare and the town of Recaș (possibly also the communes of Racovița and Topolovățu Mare and the town of Buziaș);
- in the north – the communes of Bogda, Fibiș and Sânandrei (possibly also Mașloc);
- in the west – the communes of Biled and Satchinez.

== Demographics ==
Population census
Year	2002	2011	2021
Pop.	368,102	387,604	367,430
±%	—	+5.3%	−5.2%

According to the 2021 census, the population of the 15 administrative units totals 367,430 people, of whom 250,849 live in Timișoara.

According to the 2011 census, the resident population of the Timișoara metropolitan area was 387,604, 5.3% higher than previously reported in the 2002 census. The population of the metropolitan area represents 21.2% of the population of the West development region and 56.26% of the population of Timiș County. The majority of the population (82.38%) lives in Timișoara (319,279) and only 17.62% in the area of influence (68,325), given that the area of Timișoara represents about 12% of the area of the metropolitan area. The population growth was more pronounced in the peri-urban countryside than in Timișoara, the share of the city in the total population of the area decreasing by almost 4% between 2002–2011. In its extended area of influence, defined as the area that can be reached within a 60-minute drive from the city proper, live about 950,000 people.

Network of localities and population at the 2002 and 2011 censuses
City/Commune	Locality	2002	2011	±% p.a.
Timișoara		317,660	319,279	+0.5%
	Timișoara	317,660	319,279	
Becicherecu Mic		2,417	2,853	+18.0%
	Becicherecu Mic	2,417	2,853	
Bucovăț		1,410	1,601	+13.5%
	Bucovăț	1,150	1,318	
	Bazoșu Nou	260	283	
Dudeștii Noi		2,395	3,179	+32.7%
	Dudeștii Noi	2,395	3,179	
Dumbrăvița		2,693	7,522	+179.3%
	Dumbrăvița	2,693	7,522	
Ghiroda		4,907	6,200	+26.4%
	Ghiroda	3,499	4,605	
	Giarmata-Vii	1,408	1,595	
Giarmata		5,407	6,502	+20.3%
	Giarmata	4,405	5,210	
	Cerneteaz	1,002	1,292	
Giroc		4,295	8,388	+95.3%
	Giroc	2,291	5,652	
	Chișoda	2,004	2,736	
Moșnița Nouă		4,298	6,203	+44.3%
	Moșnița Nouă	1,450	2,833	
	Moșnița Veche	1,370	1,590	
	Urseni	1,151	1,315	
	Albina	279	386	
	Rudicica	48	79	
Orțișoara		4,080	4,190	+2.7%
	Orțișoara	2,256	2,289	
	Călacea	674	723	
	Seceani	595	590	
	Cornești	555	588	
Pișchia		3,006	3,051	+1.5%
	Pișchia	1,127	1,116	
	Bencecu de Sus	870	844	
	Murani	582	646	
	Bencecu de Jos	386	396	
	Sălciua Nouă	41	49	
Remetea Mare		2,111	2,302	+9.0%
	Remetea Mare	1,286	1,495	
	Ianova	825	807	
Săcălaz		6,273	7,204	+14.8%
	Săcălaz	3,758	4,596	
	Beregsău Mare	1,704	1,747	
	Beregsău Mic	811	861	
Sânmihaiu Român		4,396	6,121	+39.2%
	Sânmihaiu Român	1,788	2,805	
	Utvin	1,875	2,451	
	Sânmihaiu German	733	865	
Șag		2,754	3,009	+9.3%
	Șag	2,754	3,009	

== Economy ==
Timișoara polarizes over 80% of the county's turnover and over 30% of the region's.

The city's economic profile, largely based on manufacturing, has encouraged the expansion of urban mass toward the larger metropolitan area. If between 1992–2012 Timișoara expanded by 13%, the metropolitan area expanded by about 18%. Some of the peri-urban localities have undergone a dramatic process of transformation. For example, during this period, Dumbrăvița expanded by 138%. Other localities expanded by 20%, 30% or 50%.

The area of influence has a mixed functional profile, generally dominated by the service sector. The villages in the immediate vicinity of the city – Ghiroda, Remetea Mare, Giroc – crossed or delimited by major roads (E70) and the villages in the vicinity of well-defined industrial areas of the city (Sânmihaiu Român) have micro-industrial areas, the industrial units located here having significant shares in the turnover of the locality (over 40%, even over 50% in the case of Giroc). In general, agriculture plays a minor role in the functional profile of the area of influence.
