= Iercici =

Iercici Ciortoș, Valea Mare
- Location within Romania

Location
- Country: Romania
- Counties: Timiș County
- Villages: Orțișoara, Călacea, Hodoni, Becicherecu Mic

Physical characteristics
- Mouth: Apa Mare
  - location: Becicherecu Mic
  - coordinates: 45.8504°N 21.0518°E
- Length: 31 km (19 mi)
- Basin size: 108 km^{2} (42 sq mi)

Basin features
- Progression: Apa Mare→ Bega Veche→ Bega→ Tisza→ Danube→ Black Sea
- Tributaries
  - left: Căran

The Iercici (also Iercicu; Ciortoș or Valea Mare) is a left tributary of the river Apa Mare in Romania. It discharges into the Apa Mare near Becicherecu Mic. Its length is 31 km (19 mi) and its basin size is 108 km^{2} (42 sq mi).
