= List of rivers of Romania: A =

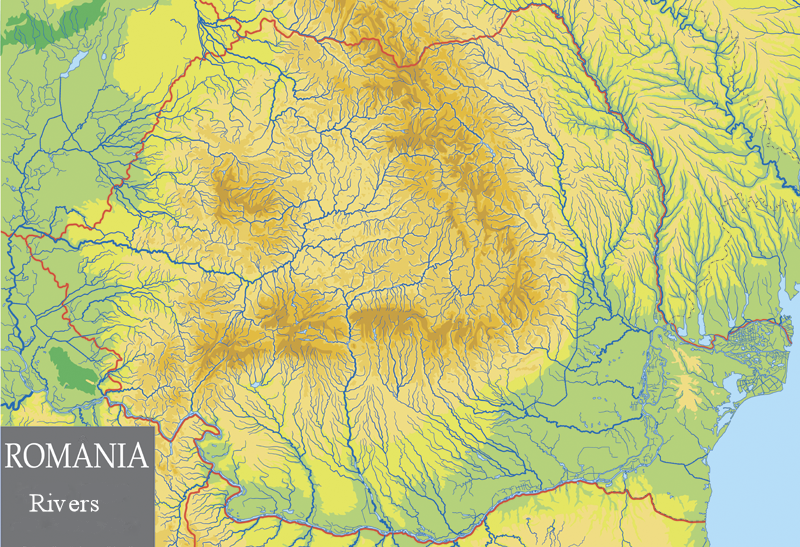
Map of Romania's hydrographic network

== A ==
River	Tributary of
Abrud	Arieș
Abucea	Mureș
Adona	Peța
Agapia	Topolița
Agârbiciu	Someșul Cald
Agăș	Trotuș
Agi Cabul	Danube–Black Sea Canal
Agrij	Someș
Agriș	Luț
Agrișteu	Târnava Mică
Aita	Olt
Aiud	Mureș
Alba	Șușița
Albac	Arieșul Mare
Albac	Hârtibaciu
Albești	Bahlueț
Albești	Black Sea
Albești	Cungrișoara

River	Tributary of
Albuia	Siret
Alceu	Crișul Repede
Almălău	Danube
Almaș	Barcău
Almaș	Cracău
Almaș	Mureș
Almaș	Someș
Aluna	Șușița
Aluniș	Călata
Aluniș	Vărbilău
Alunoasa	Olt
Amaradia	Jiu (in Gorj and Dolj Counties)
Amaradia	Jiu (in Gorj County)
Amărăzuia	Amaradia
Amnaș	Apold
Ampoi	Mureș
Ampoița	Ampoi

River	Tributary of
Anieș	Someșul Mare
Anineș	Orăștie
Aniniș	Ciocadia
Aninoasa	Dâmbovița
Aninoasa	Olt
Apa Caldă	Beliș
Apa Lină	Bărzăuța
Apa Mare	Bega Veche
Apatiu	Meleș
Apold	Secaș
Aranca	Tisza
Archita	Scroafa
Archiud	Dipșa
Arcuș	Olt
Ardeleni	Apa Mare
Ardeu	Băcâia
Argel	Moldovița
Argeș	Danube

River	Tributary of
Argeșel	Râul Târgului
Argetoaia	Jiu
Argova	Mostiștea
Arieș	Mureș
Arieș	Someș
Arieșul Mare	Arieș
Arieșul Mic	Arieș
Arman	Crișul Negru
Arpaș	Olt
Asău	Trotuș
Asuaj	Sălaj
Ața	Tarcău
Ațel	Târnava Mare
Ațintiș	Mureș
Aușel	Taia
Avrămeni	Bașeu
Avrig	Olt
Azuga	Prahova
