= Apa Mare (Bega) =

Apa Mare Vâna Ciurei, Apa Neagră
- Location within Romania

Location
- Country: Romania
- Counties: Arad, Timiș
- Villages: Vinga, Bărăteaz, Satchinez, Biled, Becicherecu Mic

Physical characteristics
- Mouth: Bega Veche
  - location: Beregsău Mare
  - coordinates: 45.7791°N 21.0377°E
- Length: 69 km (43 mi)
- Basin size: 734 km^{2} (283 sq mi)

Basin features
- Progression: Bega Veche→ Bega→ Tisza→ Danube→ Black Sea
- Tributaries
  - left: Ardeleni, Iercici, Surduc
  - right: Slatina, Sicso, Pământ Alb

The Apa Mare (also Vâna Ciurei or Apa Neagră) is a right tributary of the river Bega Veche in Romania. It discharges into the Bega Veche in Beregsău Mare. Its length is 69 km (43 mi) and its basin size is 734 km^{2} (283 sq mi).
