= Slatina (Apa Mare) =

Slatina Izvorin
- Location within Romania

Location
- Country: Romania
- Counties: Arad, Timiș
- Villages: Șagu, Mănăștur, Bărăteaz

Physical characteristics
- Mouth: Apa Mare
  - location: Bărăteaz
  - coordinates: 45.9676°N 21.0854°E
- Length: 32 km (20 mi)
- Basin size: 113 km^{2} (44 sq mi)

Basin features
- Progression: Apa Mare→ Bega Veche→ Bega→ Tisza→ Danube→ Black Sea

The Slatina (also: Izvorin) is a right tributary of the river Apa Mare in Romania. It discharges into the Apa Mare in Bărăteaz. Its length is 32 km (20 mi) and its basin size is 113 km^{2} (44 sq mi).
