= Surduc (Bega) =

- Location within Romania

Location
- Country: Romania
- Counties: Timiș County
- Villages: Dudeștii Noi

Physical characteristics
- Mouth: Apa Mare
  - coordinates: 45.8412°N 21.0461°E
- Length: 16 km (9.9 mi)
- Basin size: 47 km^{2} (18 sq mi)

Basin features
- Progression: Apa Mare→ Bega Veche→ Bega→ Tisza→ Danube→ Black Sea

The Surduc is a left tributary of the river Apa Mare in Romania. It discharges into the Apa Mare in Becicherecu Mic and crosses Dudești Noi. Its length is 16 km (9.9 mi) and its basin size is 47 km^{2} (18 sq mi).
