= Satchinez swamps =

Nature reserve in Romania

- IUCN category IV (habitat/species management area)
- Location within Romania
- Location: Satchinez, Timiș County, Romania
- Coordinates: 45°56′47″N 21°3′12″E
- Area: 1,194 ha (4.61 sq mi)
- Average elevation: 90 m (300 ft)
- Established: 1942, 1995, 2000
- Website: www.mlastinilesatchinez.ro

The Satchinez swamps, nicknamed the Banat delta, form an ornithological reserve that spreads over 1,194 ha near Satchinez, in Timiș County, Romania. It was founded in 1942, at the proposal of the Romanian ornithologist Dionisie Linția. The Satchinez swamps concentrate 40% of Romania's avifauna, being the second most important after the Danube Delta.

== Geography ==
The Satchinez swamps are located in Timiș County, about 25 km northwest of Timișoara, in the immediate vicinity of Satchinez. From a geomorphological point of view, the site is at the contact of three plains with different morphological characters: Vinga Plain, Jimbolia (Torontal) Plain and Timiș Plain. It has an area of 1,194 ha, of which 122 ha is the actual reserve, and 1,072 ha the mosaic-like buffer zone, which includes the Satchinez accumulation and a series of ponds.

The actual reserve occupies the meadow of the Ier (Apa Mare) River between Satchinez and Bărăteaz. In this sector the meadow has widths of 400 and 2,000 m, a very low average slope of only 4° and an average altitude of 90 m. This meadow, like all the river meadows in this region, is swampy and sprawls to the northeast inside the pre-mountain plain of Vinga, contrasting sharply with the wide interfluves covered with clays and its loessoid deposits that reach north of Bărăteaz altitudes of up to 119 m. The meadow has the same characters to the south, in the divagation plain of Timiș, which is otherwise characterized by the presence of large swampy areas and abandoned meanders and brooks.

The Satchinez swamps, together with the lake complex, are considered a remnant of the former swamps, periodically flooded, which in the past occupied most of the Banat Plain. Following the draining and damming works started in the first decades of the 18th century, they disappeared, so that the small swampy areas that have been preserved have become real oases that provide favorable conditions for the stopping or nesting of rare species of migratory waterfowl that cross the migration corridor in the west of the country.

== Ecosystems ==
The site lies in the Mărășești–Râtu Lișului (Râtu Duțin) area, located between Satchinez and Bărăteaz, where there is a mixed colony of herons and egrets and is characterized by the existence of permanent swamps that alternate with areas occupied by reeds, ponds, hayfields and willow patches. The biological potential of this reserve is underlined by the presence of over 100 species of protected birds at European level, of which 42 are endemic species. In addition, there are 93 species of aquatic and marsh plants, 10 plant associations and 875 species of insects.

The natural vegetation has suffered a major setback due to massive deforestation and fallow, but also transformations through drainage and replacement of species carried out in areas with excess humidity. The semi-natural environment is dominated by meadow vegetation formations. There are no natural ecosystems on the site, its entire surface being to a greater or lesser extent affected by landscaping works: arable land, grazed or mowed meadows, drainage and irrigation canals, natural and artificial ponds. The vegetation of the canals is dominated by the shrub layer, represented by dogwood, hawthorn, buckthorn, privet, dog rose and black elder. The meadows have been reduced to patches due to the expansion of arable land. They appear in meadows with species of Poa and Trifolium; in salt marshes with species of Salicornia, Artemisia and Festuca. Azonal vegetation is present near artificial ponds. The marshy vegetation is represented by reeds, bulrushes and club-rushes.

The fauna is divided into two main categories: the terrestrial fauna specific to the forest-steppe and the aquatic fauna specific to the lakes. The terrestrial fauna is of the Central European type. The forest-steppe species are mostly represented by rodents and ruminants – vole, ground squirrel, hamster, brown hare, roe and birds – quail, grey partridge, rook, starling, magpie, etc. Wetland fauna is represented by fish, aquatic mammals, birds and reptiles: marsh frog, fire-bellied toad, steppe-runner, green lizard, grass snake, mallards, egrets, herons and coots.
