= Sicso =

- Location within Romania

Location
- Country: Romania
- Counties: Timiș County
- Villages: Gelu, Satchinez

Physical characteristics
- Mouth: Apa Mare
  - location: Satchinez
  - coordinates: 45.9524°N 21.0395°E
- Length: 15 km (9.3 mi)
- Basin size: 58 km^{2} (22 sq mi)

Basin features
- Progression: Apa Mare→ Bega Veche→ Bega→ Tisza→ Danube→ Black Sea

The Sicșa is a right tributary of the river Apa Mare in Romania. It discharges into the Apa Mare in Vinga. Its length is 15 km (9.3 mi) and its basin size is 58 km^{2} (22 sq mi).
