= Călacea oil field =

Romanian oil field

Călacea
- Country: Romania
- Region: Timiș County
- Offshore/onshore: onshore
- Operator: Petrom

Field history
- Discovery: 1968
- Start of development: 1968
- Start of production: 1970

Production
- Current production of oil: 3,500 barrels per day (~1.7×10^{5} t/a)
- Estimated oil in place: 8.5 million tonnes (~ 9.9×10^{6} m^{3} or 62 million bbl)

The Călacea oil field is an oil field located in Orțișoara, Timiș County. It was discovered in 1968 and developed by Petrom. It began production in 1970 and produces oil. The total proven reserves of the Călacea oil field are around 62 million barrels (8.5 million tonnes), and production is centered on 3,500 barrels per day (560 m^{3}/d).
