= Cruceni =

Cruceni may refer to several villages in Romania:

- Cruceni, a village in Șagu Commune, Arad County
- Cruceni, a village in Foeni Commune, Timiș County
