= Satchinez oil field =

Oil field in Timiș County, Romania

Satchinez
- Country: Romania
- Region: Timiș County
- Offshore/onshore: onshore
- Operator: Petrom

Field history
- Discovery: 1968
- Start of development: 1968
- Start of production: 1970

Production
- Current production of oil: 2,000 barrels per day (~100,000 t/a)
- Estimated oil in place: 6.8 million tonnes (~ 8×10^{6} m^{3} or 50 million bbl)

The Satchinez oil field is an oil field located in Satchinez, Timiș County. It was discovered in 1968 and developed by Petrom. It began production in 1970 and produces oil. The total proven reserves of the Satchinez oil field are around 50 million barrels (6.8 million tonnes), and production is centered on 2,000 barrels per day (320 m^{3}/d).
