= Fibiș =

- Commune
- Location in Timiș County

- Location in Romania
- Coordinates: 45°58′N 21°25′E
- Country: Romania
- County: Timiș

Government
  - Mayor (2008–): Gheorghe Dorel Carcea (PNL)
- Area: 52.22 km^{2} (20.16 sq mi)
- Population (2021-12-01): 1,795
  - Density: 34.37/km^{2} (89.03/sq mi)
- Time zone: EET/EEST (UTC+2/+3)
- Postal code: 307272
- Vehicle reg.: TM
- Website: www.comunafibis.ro

Fibiș (Hungarian: Temesfüves; German: Fibisch; Serbian: Фибиш, romanized: Fibiš) is a commune in Timiș County, Romania. It is composed of a single village, Fibiș, part of the commune of Mașloc until 2004, when it was split off.

== Geography ==
Fibiș is located in the north of Timiș County, 30 km (19 mi) northeast of Timișoara, at the contact of the last extensions of the Lipova Plateau with the Timiș Plain. It borders Mașloc to the northeast, Remetea Mică to the east, Bencecu de Jos to the south, Pișchia to the southeast, Seceani to the west and Firiteaz and Fiscut (Arad County) to the northwest.

== History ==
The first recorded mention of Fibiș dates from 1234 (Fiues). However, Hungarian historian Samu Borovszky claims that Fibiș was founded in 1380 on the hearth of a former village called Batriu. By 1446, when it was known as Fÿüves, Fibiș belonged to Arad District. At the 1717 census Fibiș had 20 houses. According to Hungarian historians Váli and Nagy, Fibiș was mostly Romanian during this period. Towards the end of the 19th century, several Hungarian and German families were settled here. Romanians had their own school since 1777, while the German school was built in 1891. Fibiș was bought in 1815 by Prince Karl Schwarzenberg, who sold it to Péter Tököly in 1819. In 1845 it became the property of Greek-Austrian banker Simon Sinas. Around 1940, Romanians and Germans mostly lived separately, and Hungarians were scattered among Romanians and Germans and the so-called Gyepsoron. Since 1989, many Romanian, Hungarian and German residents have left the village; the German community has virtually disappeared. Between 1967 and 2004 Fibiș belonged to the commune of Mașloc, then it became an independent commune.

== Demographics ==
Ethnic composition (2021)
1. Romanians (92.0%)
2. Hungarians (2.11%)
3. Unknown (3.95%)
4. Others (1.97%)
Religious composition (2021)
1. Orthodox (85.4%)
2. Roman Catholics (3.67%)
3. Pentecostals (3.50%)
4. Baptists (2.17%)
5. Unknown (4.45%)
6. Others (0.81%)

Fibiș had a population of 1,795 inhabitants at the 2021 census, up 12.89% from the 2011 census. Most inhabitants are Romanians (91.97%), with a minority of Hungarians (2.11%). For 3.95% of the population, ethnicity is unknown. By religion, most inhabitants are Orthodox (85.4%), but there are also minorities of Roman Catholics (3.67%), Pentecostals (3.5%) and Baptists (2.17%). For 4.45% of the population, religious affiliation is unknown.

Census		Ethnic composition
Year	Population	Romanians	Hungarians	Germans
1880	2,305	1,384	325	587
1890	2,291	1,356	292	617
1900	2,346	1,354	332	649
1910	2,430	1,367	472	569
1920	2,299	1,289	466	527
1930	2,161	1,416	339	394
1941	2,257	1,507	360	380
1956	2,037	–	–	–
1966	2,039	1,521	266	251
1977	1,976	1,610	195	150
1992	1,630	1,435	108	14
2002	1,678	1,500	117	10
2011	1,590	1,461	56	–
2021	1,795	1,651	38	3

== Politics and administration ==
The commune of Fibiș is administered by a mayor and a local council composed of 11 councilors. The mayor, Gheorghe Dorel Carcea, from the National Liberal Party, has been in office since 2008. As from the 2024 local elections, the local council has the following composition by political parties:

Party	Seats	Composition
National Liberal Party	5	
Social Democratic Party	3	
Ind.	1	
Alliance for the Union of Romanians	1	
Save Romania Union–People's Movement Party–Force of the Right	1	
