= Pământ Alb =

- Location within Romania

Location
- Country: Romania
- Counties: Timiș County

Physical characteristics
- Mouth: Apa Mare
  - location: Biled
  - coordinates: 45.8793°N 20.9814°E
- Length: 23 km (14 mi)
- Basin size: 131 km^{2} (51 sq mi)

Basin features
- Progression: Apa Mare→ Bega Veche→ Bega→ Tisza→ Danube→ Black Sea
- Tributaries
  - right: Valea Apei

The Pământ Alb is a right tributary of the river Apa Mare in Romania. It discharges into the Apa Mare in Biled. Its length is 23 km (14 mi) and its basin size is 131 km^{2} (51 sq mi).
