= Dudeștii Noi =

- Commune
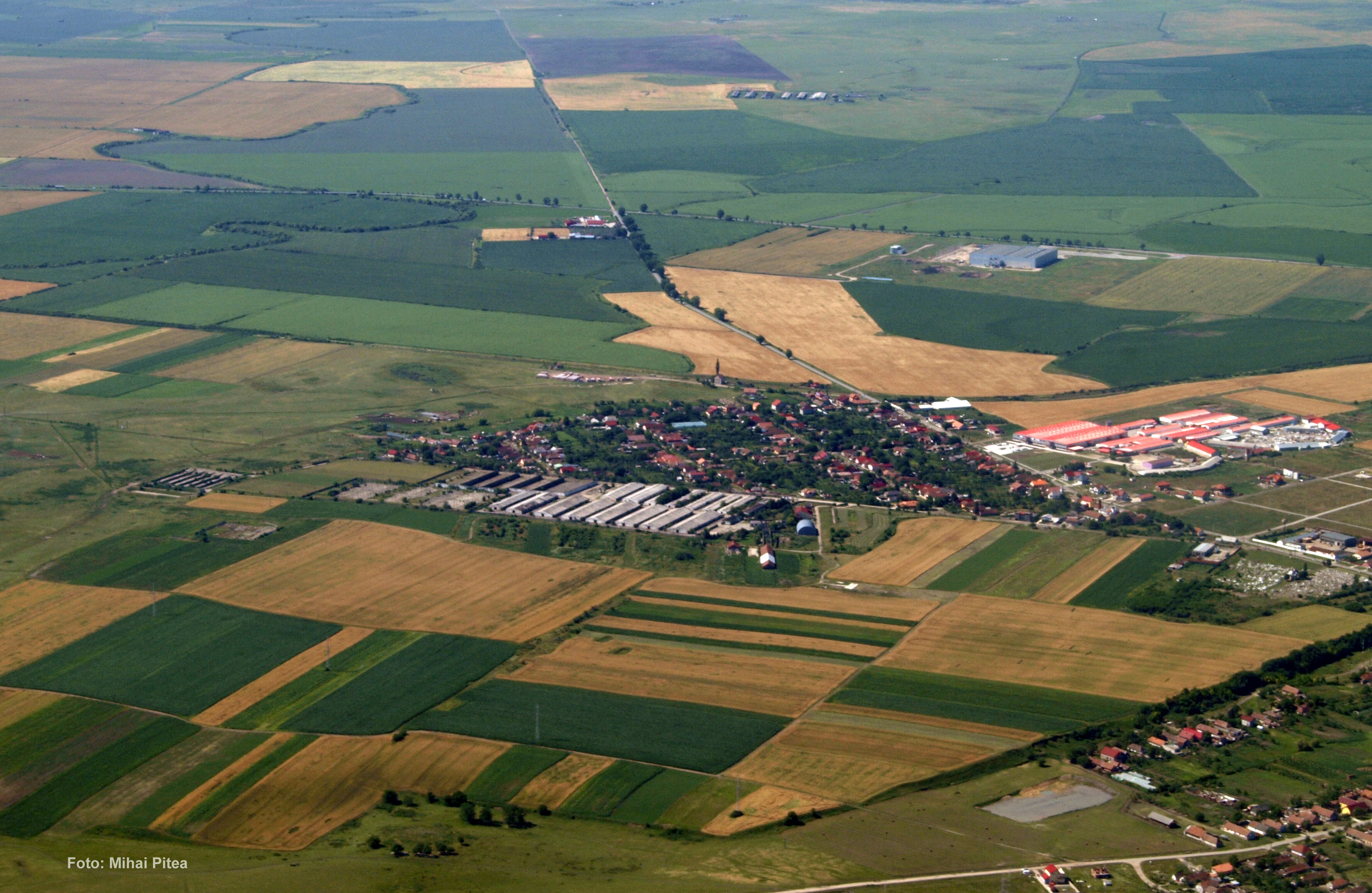
- Aerial view of Dudeștii Noi

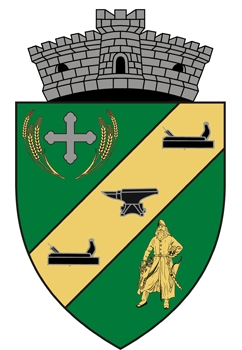
- Coat of arms

- Location in Timiș County

- Location in Romania
- Coordinates: 45°50′N 21°6′E
- Country: Romania
- County: Timiș

Government
  - Mayor (2020–): Ion Goșa (PNL)
- Area: 53.96 km^{2} (20.83 sq mi)
- Population (2021-12-01): 3,665
  - Density: 67.92/km^{2} (175.9/sq mi)
- Time zone: UTC+02:00 (EET)
  - Summer (DST): UTC+03:00 (EEST)
- Postal code: 307041
- Vehicle reg.: TM
- Website: pcdn.ro

Dudeștii Noi (known as Beșenova Nouă until 1964; German: Neubeschenowa; Hungarian: Újbesenyő; Serbian: Ново Бешеново, romanized: Novo Bešenovo) is a commune in Timiș County, Romania. It is composed of a single village, Dudeștii Noi, part of the commune of Becicherecu Mic until 2004, when it was split off.

== Geography ==
Dudeștii Noi is located in the southeastern part of the Banat moorland, as part of the Great Hungarian Plain. It borders Hodoni to the north, Sânandrei to the northeast, Săcălaz to the south and Becicherecu Mic to the west. Dudeștii Noi is crossed in its southern and eastern parts by Bega Veche, the old course of the Bega River before the construction of the canal and, currently, a continuation of Beregsău River. Most of the former swamps have been drained, now occupying a very small area. In order to stop the rainwater ponding favored by the reduced slopes and the clayey soils, which allow the water to stagnate, a system of canals was created that are connected to Bega Veche.

=== Climate ===
Dudeștii Noi has a temperate continental climate, with hot summers, not too cold winters, early springs and quite long autumns. The average annual temperature is 10.9 °C (51.6 °F). On approximately 100 days a year, the average temperature exceeds 25 °C (77 °F), while temperatures above 30 °C (86 °F) are recorded for about 40 days. The natural protection offered by the Semenic Mountains, the Poiana Ruscă Massif, the Zărand Mountains and the Lipova Hills leaves open the way for the humid air masses that come from the west and influence the precipitation regime. The most frequent winds – austru, comloș and băltăreț – blow from the northwest and are warm and humid. The average annual rainfall is 631 mm (24.8 in), the average annual humidity is 74%, and the average number of days with snowfall is 29.8. Between October and November, in Dudeștii Noi fog and hoar are often recorded; during summer dewy mornings are frequent, and during winter rime, hail or frost are reported.

=== Flora and fauna ===
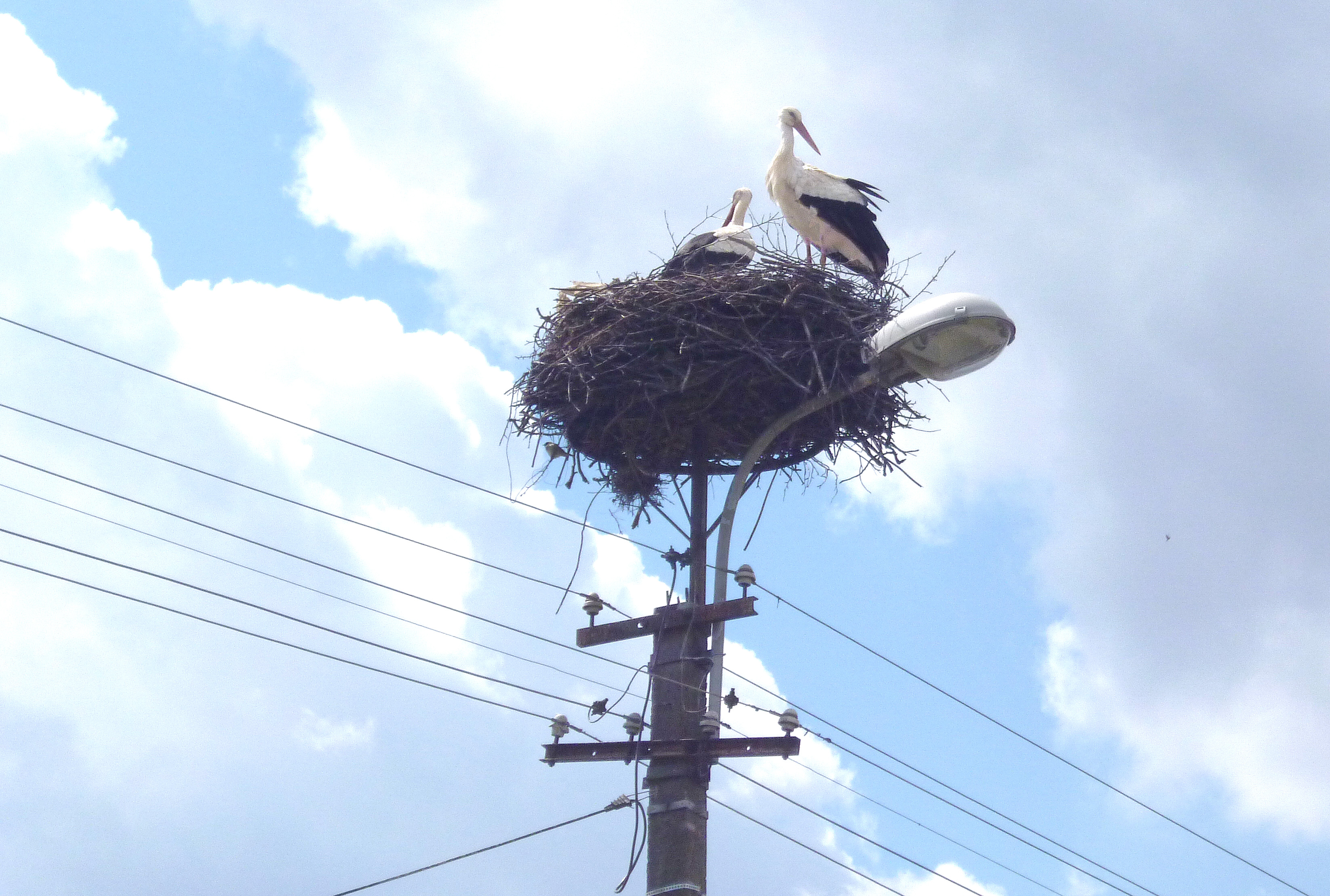
Pair of storks on a power pole in Dudeștii Noi

The grassy vegetation, different types of shrubs, plants specific to swampy areas and trees such as willow, poplar, linden, chestnut or locust are the most widespread species in the commune, but most of its territory has been transformed into agricultural land, natural vegetation characteristic of the area being replaced by crops.

Regarding the fauna, different species of rodents, lizards, quails, pheasants, storks, birds of prey, swallows, martins, sparrows, wild ducks, wild geese, accidentally birds from the ornithological reserve in Dudeștii Noi, different species of fish – perch, dwarf catfish, carp, rudd, bream are common; among the mammals, frequently spotted here are the hare, the fox, the badger and the polecat.

== History ==
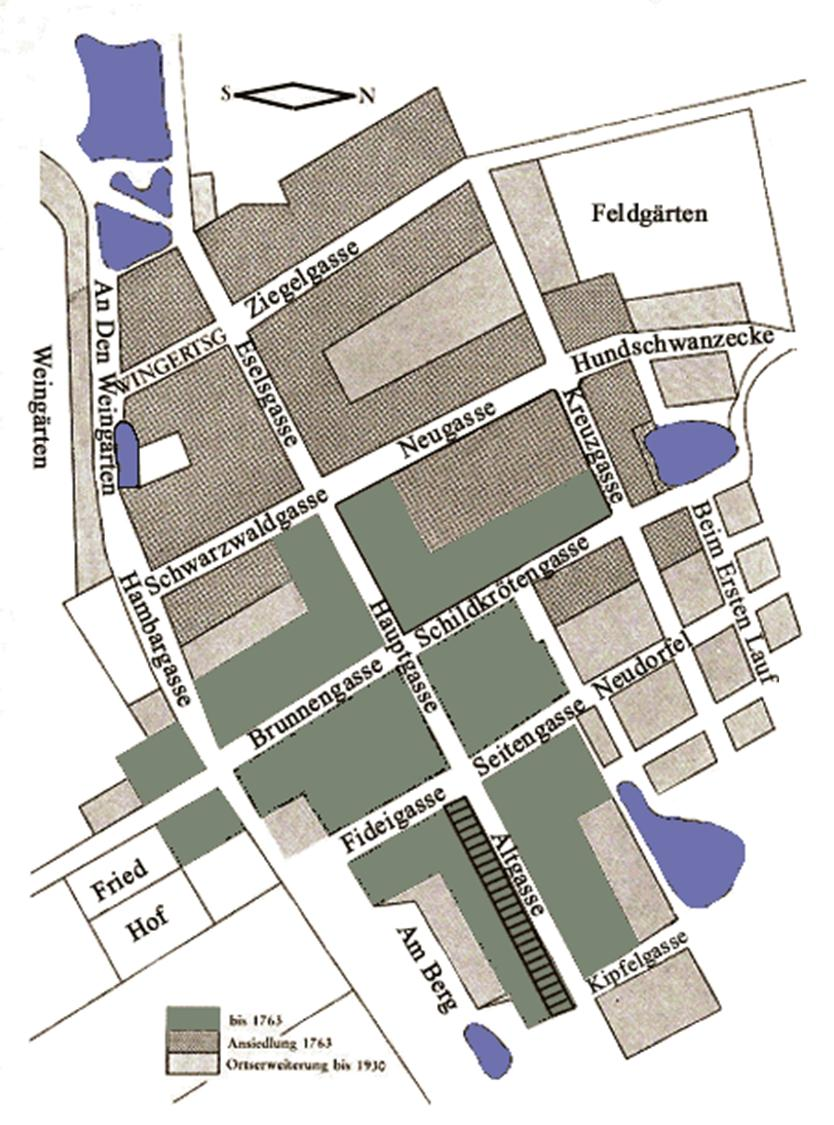
Settlement phases of Neubeschenowa until 1763 settlement of 1763 expansion until 1930

Dacians, Romans, Goths, Huns, Gepids, Awards, Serbs, Slovenes, Mongols and Turks attacked or settled in Banat over the centuries while thrusting aside or annihilating each other in mutual confrontations. The name of the village, Bessenovo, originated from an earlier settlement by the Pechenegs. It was first documented in the papal tithes in 1332. In 1551, the Ottomans entered Banat. The occupation only ended when Prince Eugene of Savoy and the Austrian troops took Timișoara on 13 October 1756. By now the whole area had become depopulated, impoverished and marshy. In the Treaty of Passarowitz the Banat of Temeswar was subordinated to the Hofkammer in Vienna as crown land of the Kaiser on 21 July 1718. Count Claude Florimond de Mercy was assigned in 1720 with the administration, reclamation and governance of Banat. Initially he recruited immigrants predominantly from his native country Lorraine for the province entrusted in his care. The Lorrainian Johann Oßwald, already having lived in Banat 20 years, recruited 60 German-Lorrainian families (290 people) from the areas around Mainz and Trier to settle in Beschenowa. In 1748, as part of the Große Schwabenwanderungen (Great Swabian Migrations) of the Danube Swabians, this first group of voluntary imperial colonists arrived, most of which came on floats called Ulmer Schachtel, traveling on the Danube from the German town of Ulm for about two or three weeks. In 1750 another group of settlers arrived. The name of Neubeschenowa was adopted to distinguish the village from Altbeschenowa, present-day Dudeștii Vechi, also located in Banat. Following the unrests by the Salpeters in the shire of Hauenstein, Schwarzwald, several families were deported by force and resettled in Neubeschenowa. Several decommissioned soldiers also settled in the community in 1763. The family of Habsburg-Lorraine signed over politically the Banat of Temeswar to Hungary in 1778.

9 August 1849 saw the deciding battle of the Hungarian Revolution of 1848 close to Neubeschenowa. 30,000 soldiers of the Austrian army with 108 cannons, led by Count Julius Jacob von Haynau met at the Nyárád Creek the 55,000 soldiers and 108 cannons strong Hungarian army under the command of the Generals Henryk Dembiński and Józef Bem. The victory of the Austrian troops ended the siege of Temeswar after 107 days, and Banat becomes Austrian crown land once again. Following the Ausgleich between Austria and Hungary in 1867, Banat and Transylvania come under Hungarian rule again. 325 emigrants left Neubeschenowa for North America between 1906–1908, of which 65 returned later. The emigrants transferred 375,000 Kronen back home.

During World War I, 127 persons died or were missing in action. Following the collapse of the k.u.k. monarchy, the Banat Republic was proclaimed in 1918. In 1918–1919 (confirmed by the Treaty of Versailles of 1919 and the Treaty of Trianon of 1920), most of Banat and Neubeschenowa became now part of Romania. The first National Socialist labour camp of the Hitler Youth of Banat was held in Neubeschenowa during the summer of 1933. During World War II, 37 men die in the service of the Romanian army, and 83 men in the German Army. After Romania changed sides and joined the Allies, 19 families fled in September 1944, and all remaining inhabitants were evacuated to the neighboring village of St. Andreas between 29 September–10 October. During the organized expulsion of Germans from Romania after World War II, 297 men and women were deported for reconstruction works to Ukraine in January and February 1945, of which 68 died in the coal mines as forced laborers. The remaining German population was expropriated. The first Romanian colonists arrived in July, and in 1947 almost every house in Neubeschenowa was occupied by Romanians. 1951–1956 saw the deportation of 62 families to the Bărăgan Plain to a makeshift shanty town by the name of Bumbăcari, northeast of Bucharest, after the Soviet model of the Gulag. 22 of the 170 deported did not return. Following the Family Reunion Treaty between Germany and Romania in 1978, and later after the fall of the Ceauşescu regime in December 1989, most of the Danube Swabian/German population of Neubeschenowa left in two large waves of emigration, mainly to Germany.

== Demographics ==
Ethnic composition (2021)
1. Romanians (80.7%)
2. Roma (7.72%)
3. Unknown (9.57%)
4. Others (2.01%)
Religious composition (2021)
1. Orthodox (76.4%)
2. Pentecostals (4.28%)
3. Roman Catholics (2.78%)
4. Baptists (2.34%)
5. Adventists (1.14%)
6. Unknown (11.3%)
7. Others (1.48%)
8. Irreligious, atheists and agnostics (0.27%)

Dudeștii Noi had a population of 3,665 inhabitants at the 2021 census, up 15.29% from the 2011 census. Most inhabitants are Romanians (80.7%), with a minority of Roma (7.72%). For 9.57% of the population, ethnicity is unknown. By religion, most inhabitants are Orthodox (76.39%), but there are also minorities of Pentecostals (4.28%), Roman Catholics (2.78%), Baptists (2.34%) and Adventists (1.14%). For 11.32% of the population, religious affiliation is unknown.

Census		Ethnic composition
Year	Population	Romanians	Hungarians	Germans	Roma
1880	2,743	12	6	2,662	–
1890	3,134	13	28	3,006	–
1900	2,857	78	50	2,677	–
1910	2,541	14	37	2,355	49
1920	2,456	–	19	2,291	–
1930	2,400	14	14	2,223	141
1941	2,309	36	20	2,108	–
1956	2,559	–	–	–	–
1966	2,672	1,353	23	1,279	8
1977	2,658	1,359	39	1,117	133
1992	2,265	1,964	32	93	141
2002	2,395	2,234	36	44	64
2011	3,179	2,755	46	44	169
2021	3,665	2,958	34	22	283

== Politics and administration ==
The commune of Dudeștii Noi is administered by a mayor and a local council composed of 13 councilors. The mayor, Ion Goșa, from the National Liberal Party, has been in office since 2020. As from the 2024 local elections, the local council has the following composition by political parties:

Party	Seats	Composition
Save Romania Union–People's Movement Party–Force of the Right	5	
Social Democratic Party	4	
National Liberal Party	2	
Social Liberal Humanist Party	1	
Alliance for the Union of Romanians	1	

== Culture ==
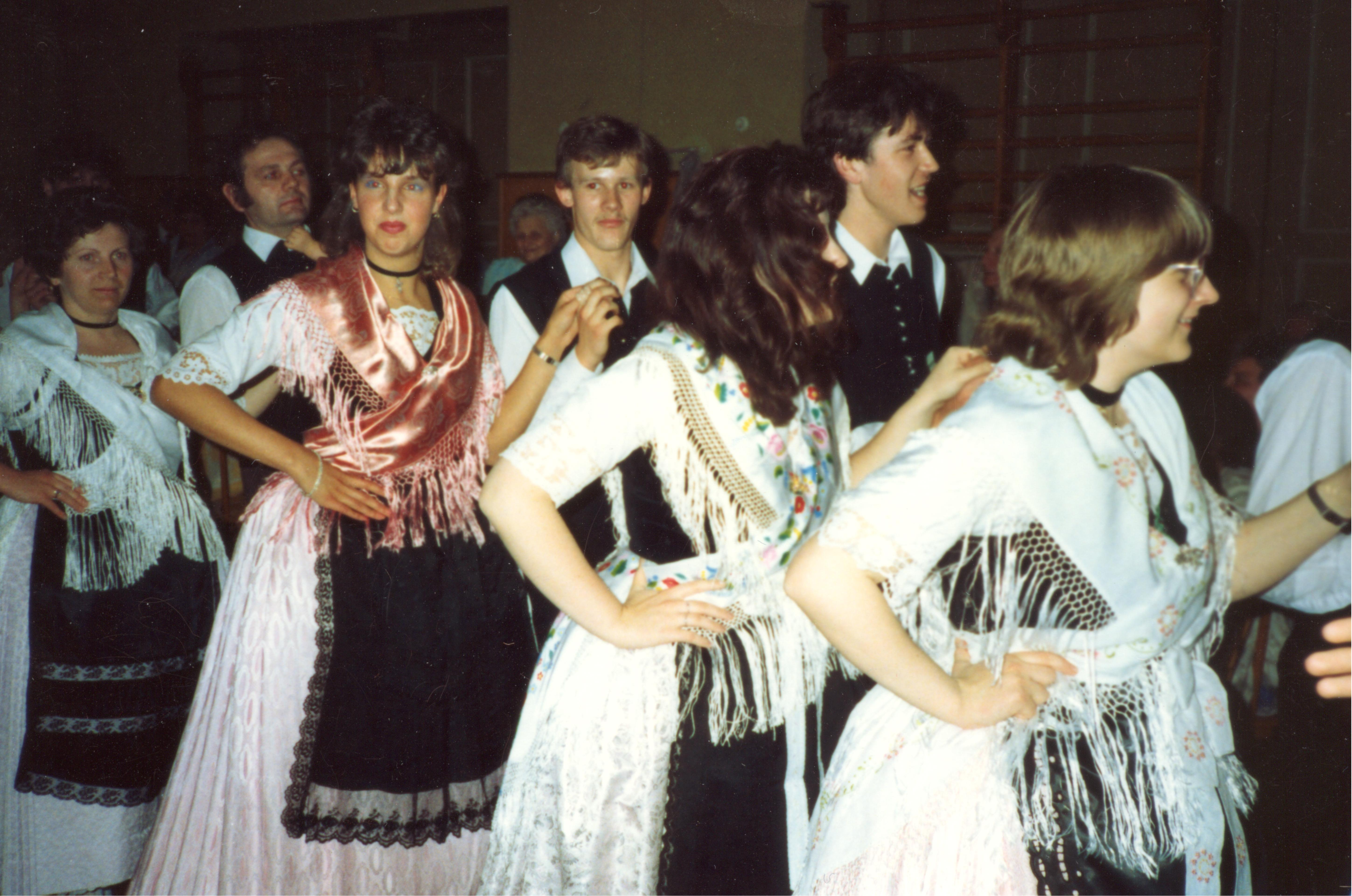
Traditional dance group from Dudeștii Noi in 1988

The Heimatortsgemeinschaft (Home Town Community) upholds the German traditions of Dudeștii Noi. The goals of the association are to foster relations between original residents and fellow countrymen living abroad, as well as to preserve traditional customs. The community meets regularly since 1957, and biannually since 1981 in the area of Augsburg, Germany. Holy masses are said and church services are held during those gatherings, followed by traditional Kirchweih dance presentations and parades in traditional costumes, to the tunes of traditional oompah-style brass bands.

=== Places of worship ===
==== Roman Catholic ====
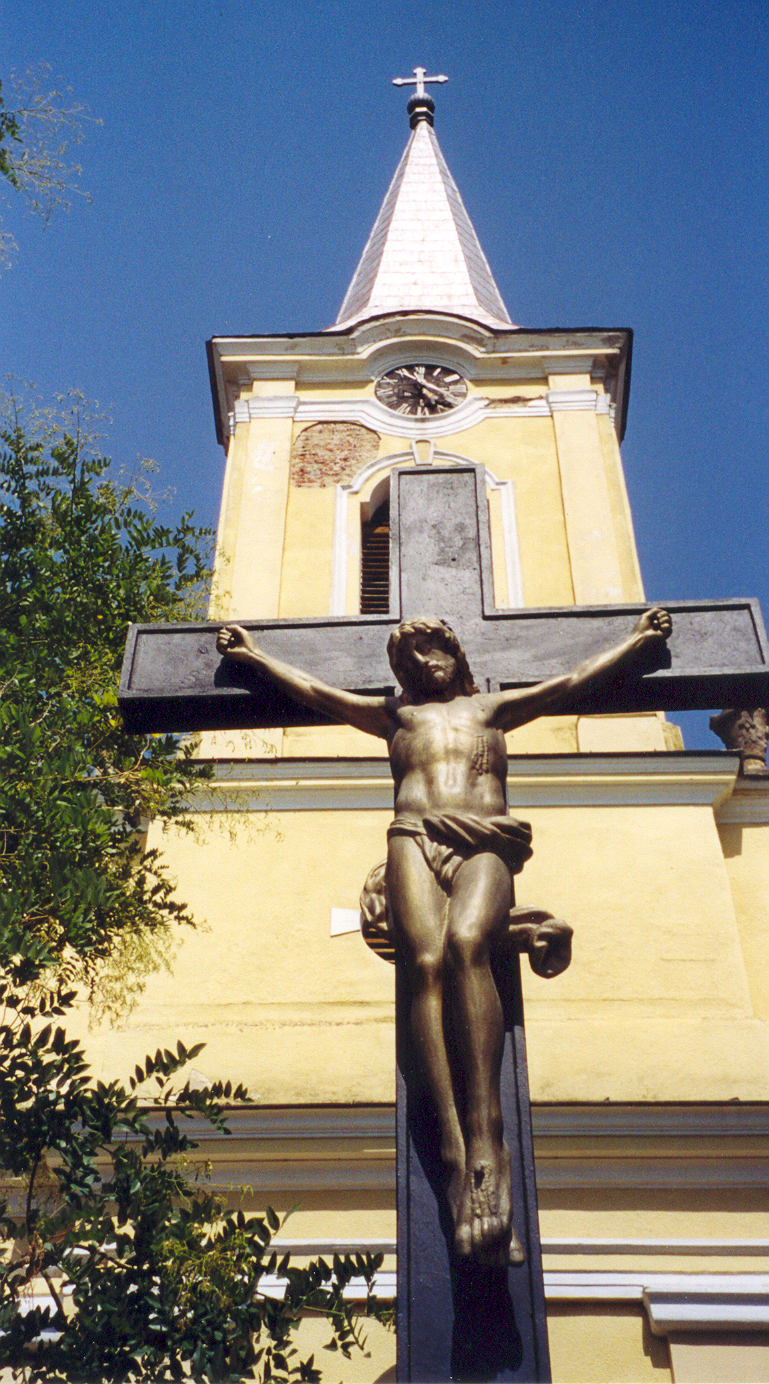
St. Wendelin Church in 2003

The first rectory was founded in 1334. The church was built in 1750–1751 and is one of the oldest Swabian churches in Banat. Patron saint of the church is Saint Wendelin. In 1761, the Archdiocese of Neubeschenowa was founded, and Father Titzer was appointed archpriest. The new archdiocese consisted of 28 parishes, with about 13,000 parishioners. Since 1754, it has observed the religious holidays of Saint Wendelin of Trier, Saint Roch of Montpellier, Saint John of Nepomuk, Saint Quirinus of Tegernsee and the Sacred Heart of Jesus. The first organ was bought in 1764 for 150 guilders. The church bell was cast in Graz, and in 1767, the church was equipped with the clock in its tower. In 1774, as the number of parishioners increased significantly, the extension and renovation of the church was approved, and a new tower was built. A chapel dedicated to Saint Roch was built in the middle of the new cemetery in 1844; the first cemetery in Dudeștii Noi was consecrated in 1751.

==== Orthodox ====
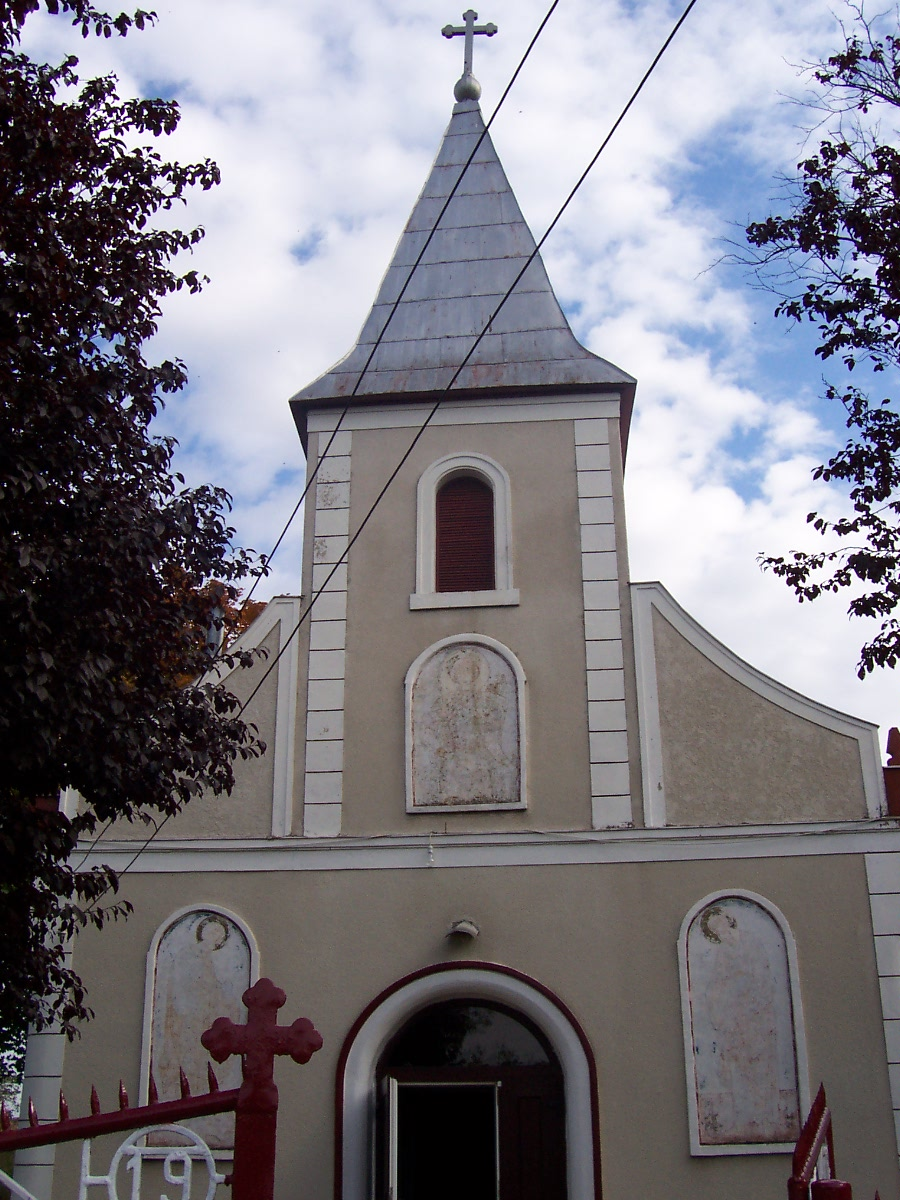
The Orthodox church

An Orthodox church dedicated to Saint Demetrius of Thessaloniki was built in 1970. The church has become too small for the growing number of Orthodox, so in 2021 construction began on a new Orthodox church in Dudeștii Noi.

== Notable people ==
- Johann Heinrich Schwicker (1839–1902), historian
- Josef Nischbach (1889–1970), professor of theology, canon and prelate
- Ede Tomori (1920–1997), photographer
