= Ede Tomori =

Hungarian photographer (1920–1997)

Ede Ignác Tomori ([ˈɛdɛ ˈtomori]; April 28, 1920, in Dudeştii Noi – December 30, 1997, in Budapest) was a Hungarian photographer.

== Life and work ==
Tomori started his career as photographer in 1952, at the age of 32, at the Budapest Amateur Photo Club. He was appointed club secretary in 1957, general secretary in 1960, and president in 1976. Between 1957 and 1960, in the role of full-time secretary of the Association of Hungarian Photographers, he had the task of setting up new photographic associations country-wide. From 1967 he was the association's delegate to the FIAP.

He began his professional career at the state-owned travel agency IBUSZ in 1961, shooting photos for tourist brochures, calendars and posters. Between 1967 and 1971 he worked as commercial photographer for the state-owned FŐFOTÓ company, and as freelance photographer from 1971. He participated regularly in international exhibitions showing travel photographs, commercial photographs and still lifes, winning several prizes.

== Sources ==
- Biographical entry by Károly Kincses at www.artportal.hu
