= Ardeleni =

- Location within Romania

Location
- Country: Romania
- Counties: Arad County
- Villages: Hunedoara Timișană, Vinga

Physical characteristics
- Mouth: Apa Mare
  - location: Vinga
  - coordinates: 46.0075°N 21.1904°E
- Length: 14 km (8.7 mi)
- Basin size: 76 km^{2} (29 sq mi)

Basin features
- Progression: Apa Mare→ Bega Veche→ Bega→ Tisza→ Danube→ Black Sea
- Tributaries
  - left: Valea Viilor

The Ardeleni is a left tributary of the river Apa Mare in Romania. It discharges into the Apa Mare in Vinga. Its length is 14 km (8.7 mi) and its basin size is 76 km^{2} (29 sq mi).
