= Sânmihaiu Român =

- Commune
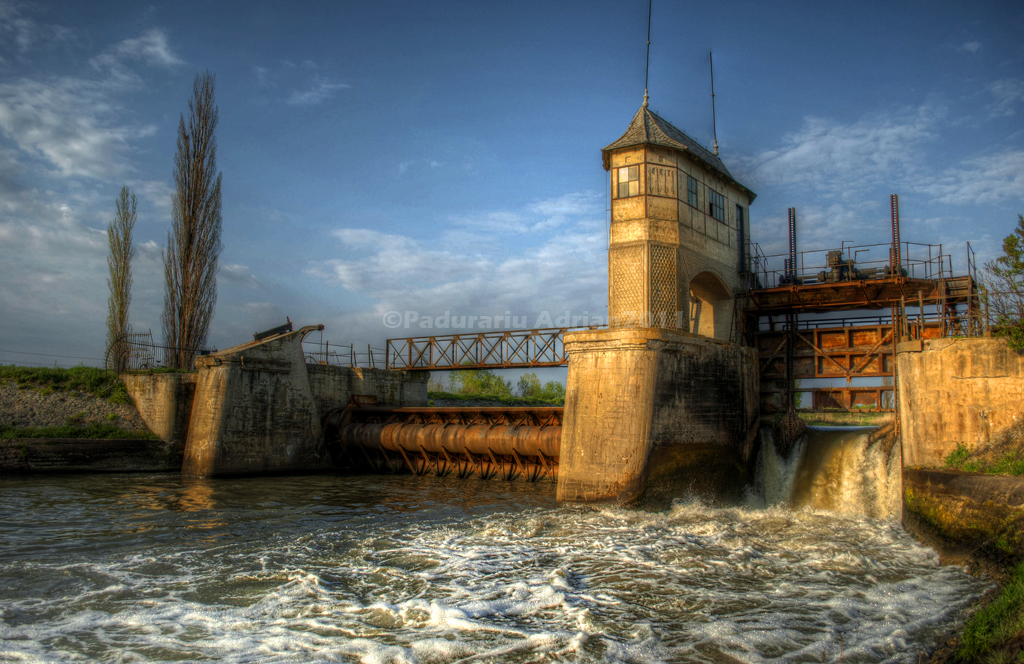
- The water gate at the Sânmihaiu Român hydrotechnical node before renovation

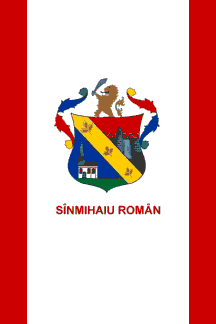
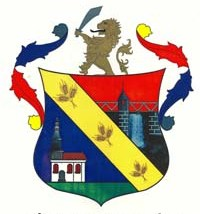
- Flag Coat of arms

- Location in Timiș County

- Location in Romania
- Coordinates: 45°42′N 21°5′E
- Country: Romania
- County: Timiș

Government
  - Mayor (2016–): Viorel Marcuți (PSD)
- Area: 88.5 km^{2} (34.2 sq mi)
- Elevation: 88 m (289 ft)
- Population (2021-12-01): 8,419
  - Density: 95.1/km^{2} (246/sq mi)
- Time zone: UTC+02:00 (EET)
  - Summer (DST): UTC+03:00 (EEST)
- Postal code: 307380–307382
- Area code: 0256
- Vehicle reg.: TM
- Website: www.sinmihaiuroman.ro

Sânmihaiu Român (Hungarian: Bégaszentmihály or Oláhszentmihály; German: Rumänisch-Sankt-Michael; Serbian: Румунски Семихај, romanized: Rumunski Semihaj) is a commune in Timiș County, Romania. It is composed of three villages: Sânmihaiu German, Sânmihaiu Român (commune seat) and Utvin. It lies on the canalized section of the river Bega, southwest of Timișoara.

== History ==
=== Sânmihaiu Român ===
The first recorded mention of Sânmihaiu Român dates from 1333, being mentioned in the papal tithe records with the name Sanctus Michael. Historian Ioan Lotreanu considers that the assignment of this name is erroneous, being confused with Sveti Mihajlo in Serbian Banat. However, there are also later mentions in documents, such as a diploma from 1350 in which the locality is named Sanctus Mychael.

Old Romanian village, it resisted the Turkish occupation, so that in 1717, after the conquest of Banat by the Austrians, it had 40 houses. It then appears written on Count Mercy's map from 1723–1725 and on maps from 1761 and 1783. The Romanian church was built in 1774.

In the interwar period it was part of Plasa Chișoda, Timiș-Torontal County, it had over 2,000 inhabitants and over 500 houses.

=== Sânmihaiu German ===
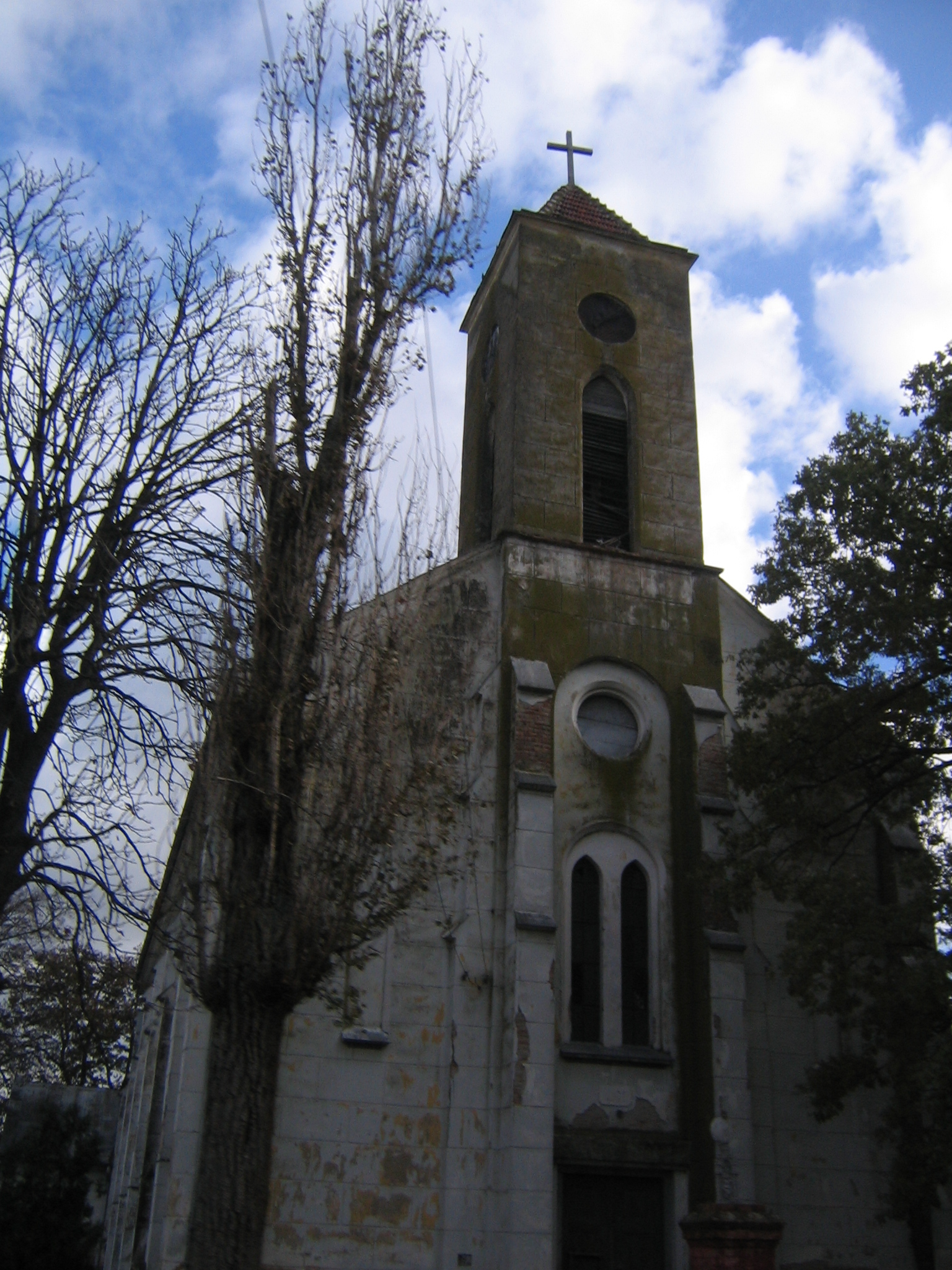
Roman Catholic church in Sânmihaiu German

The village of Sânmihaiu German was among the first settlements in Banat to be colonized following the Habsburg Empire's conquest of the region. The initial wave of German (Swabian) settlers arrived in 1717, followed by a second group in 1808. The new settlement was established on the site of the former village of Sillach and was initially named Rauthendorf, after Rauth, an official who played a key role in the colonization efforts. Later, the village became known as Deutschsanktmichael, the German equivalent of its current name.

=== Utvin ===
The first recorded mention of the settlement dates back to 1338, when it appears in papal registers under the names Uthwin or Kis Otveny. These documents indicate that the village had the right to organize fairs. In 1456, it briefly came under the ownership of John Hunyadi, after which it passed through the hands of various Hungarian feudal lords. In 1552, the Count of Timișoara annexed Utvin to the Timișoara Fortress. Historical sources also mention a settlement called Orași, located further south of Utvin, which no longer exists today. An Ottoman defter from 1554 records Utvin as having 170 houses, a notably high number for that time.

According to tradition, the original wooden church was built in 1714. It was destroyed by fire sometime after 1760. In 1766, the villagers constructed a new brick church on the same site where the old one had stood.

In modern times, the 1910 census recorded the settlement as having 312 buildings and a population of 1,440. Of these, 1,095 were Orthodox Romanians, along with 180 Hungarians and 105 Germans. The village also had a railway stop. By 1912, two major landowners were noted: Mihai Acxel de Zombor and Valentin Watz. The commune had a brickyard, operated by the Dunster and Wetzler company. One of the nearby fields is popularly known as "La piatră", where the foundation lines of an old church are still visible—likely marking the location of the village center during the medieval period.

== Demographics ==
Ethnic composition (2021)
1. Romanians (78.8%)
2. Hungarians (1.34%)
3. Unknown (17.9%)
4. Others (1.96%)
Religious composition (2011)
1. Orthodox (63.9%)
2. Pentecostals (8.13%)
3. Roman Catholics (3.23%)
4. Baptists (1.36%)
5. Unknown (19.2%)
6. Others (3.06%)
7. Irreligious, atheists and agnostics (1.11%)

Sânmihaiu Român had a population of 8,419 inhabitants at the 2021 census, up 37.53% from the 2011 census. Most inhabitants are Romanians (78.79%), with a minority of Hungarians (1.34%). For 17.91% of the population, ethnicity is unknown. By religion, most inhabitants are Orthodox (63.93%), but there are also minorities of Pentecostals (8.13%), Roman Catholics (3.23%) and Baptists (1.36%). For 19.18% of the population, religious affiliation is unknown.

Census		Ethnic composition
Year	Population	Romanians	Hungarians	Germans	Roma	Serbs
1880	4,337	2,733	113	1,455	–	4
1890	4,753	2,952	208	1,523	–	39
1900	5,011	2,929	285	1,745	–	46
1910	4,726	2,898	433	1,317	–	22
1920	4,384	2,715	368	1,238	–	–
1930	4,578	2,982	343	1,182	44	10
1941	4,547	2,978	383	1,113	–	–
1956	4,114	3,103	343	625	23	13
1966	4,430	3,528	381	471	25	16
1977	4,767	4,002	289	404	49	12
1992	3,911	3,608	157	82	41	10
2002	4,396	4,130	132	66	40	9
2011	6,121	5,387	150	32	45	18
2021	8,419	6,634	113	28	51	33

== Politics and administration ==
The commune of Sânmihaiu Român is administered by a mayor and a local council composed of 15 councilors. The mayor, Viorel Marcuți, from the Social Democratic Party, has been in office since 2016. As from the 2024 local elections, the local council has the following composition by political parties:

Party	Seats	Composition
Social Democratic Party	6	
National Liberal Party	3	
Save Romania Union–People's Movement Party–Force of the Right	3	
Alliance for the Union of Romanians	3	

== Notable people ==
- Ciprian Radovan (b. 1939), painter, art critic and scientist

== Twin towns ==
- (France) Mornac
