= Alunoasa =

- Location within Romania

Location
- Country: Romania
- Counties: Vâlcea County

Physical characteristics
- Mouth: Olt
  - location: Sânbotin
  - coordinates: 45.1716°N 24.3698°E
- Length: 14 km (8.7 mi)
- Basin size: 26 km^{2} (10 sq mi)

Basin features
- Progression: Olt→ Danube→ Black Sea

The Alunoasa is a left tributary of the river Olt in Romania. It flows into the Olt in Sânbotin, Vâlcea County. Its length is 14 km (8.7 mi) and its basin size is 26 km^{2} (10 sq mi).
