= Becicherecu Mic =

- Commune
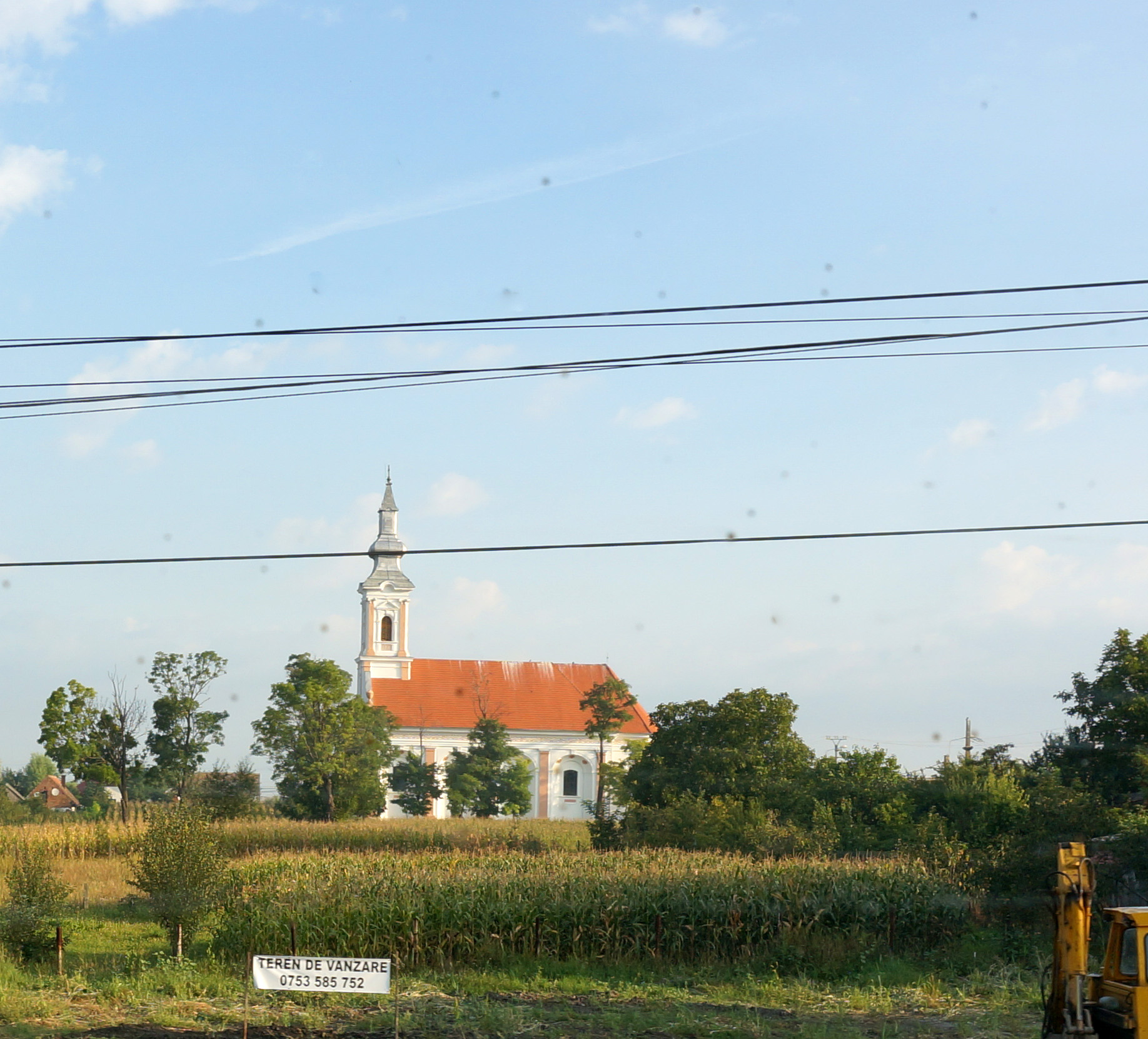
- Serbian church in Becicherecu Mic

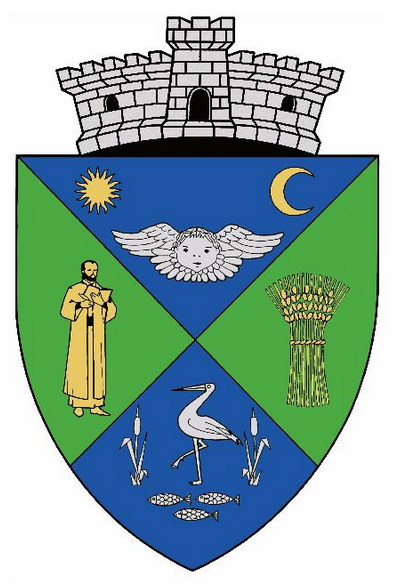
- Coat of arms

- Location in Timiș County

- Location in Romania
- Coordinates: 45°50′N 21°3′E
- Country: Romania
- County: Timiș

Government
  - Mayor (2012–): Raimond-Ovidiu Rusu (PSD)
- Area: 46.65 km^{2} (18.01 sq mi)
- Population (2021-12-01): 2,875
  - Density: 61.63/km^{2} (159.6/sq mi)
- Time zone: UTC+02:00 (EET)
  - Summer (DST): UTC+03:00 (EEST)
- Postal code: 307040
- Vehicle reg.: TM
- Website: www.becicherecu-mic.ro

Becicherecu Mic (Hungarian: Kisbecskerek; German: Fischdorf or Kleinbetschkerek; Serbian: Мали Бечкерек, romanized: Mali Bečkerek) is a commune in Timiș County, Romania. It is composed of a single village, Becicherecu Mic. It also included Dudeștii Noi until 2004, when it was split off to form a separate commune. Its name means "Small Becicherec", as opposed to the "Great Becicherec" (Becicherecu Mare in Romanian), located in Serbia and renamed Zrenjanin in 1946.

== Location ==
Becicherecu Mic is located 17 km (11 mi) northwest of Timișoara, on the national road DN6 Timișoara–Sânnicolau Mare–Cenad. It is also connected to the Timișoara–Cenad railway, which passes to the south, with the Pescărețul Mic station.

It borders Dudeștii Noi to the east, Hodoni to the north, Săcălaz to the southeast, Beregsău Mare to the south, Iecea Mică and Iecea Mare to the west and Biled to the northwest.

== History ==
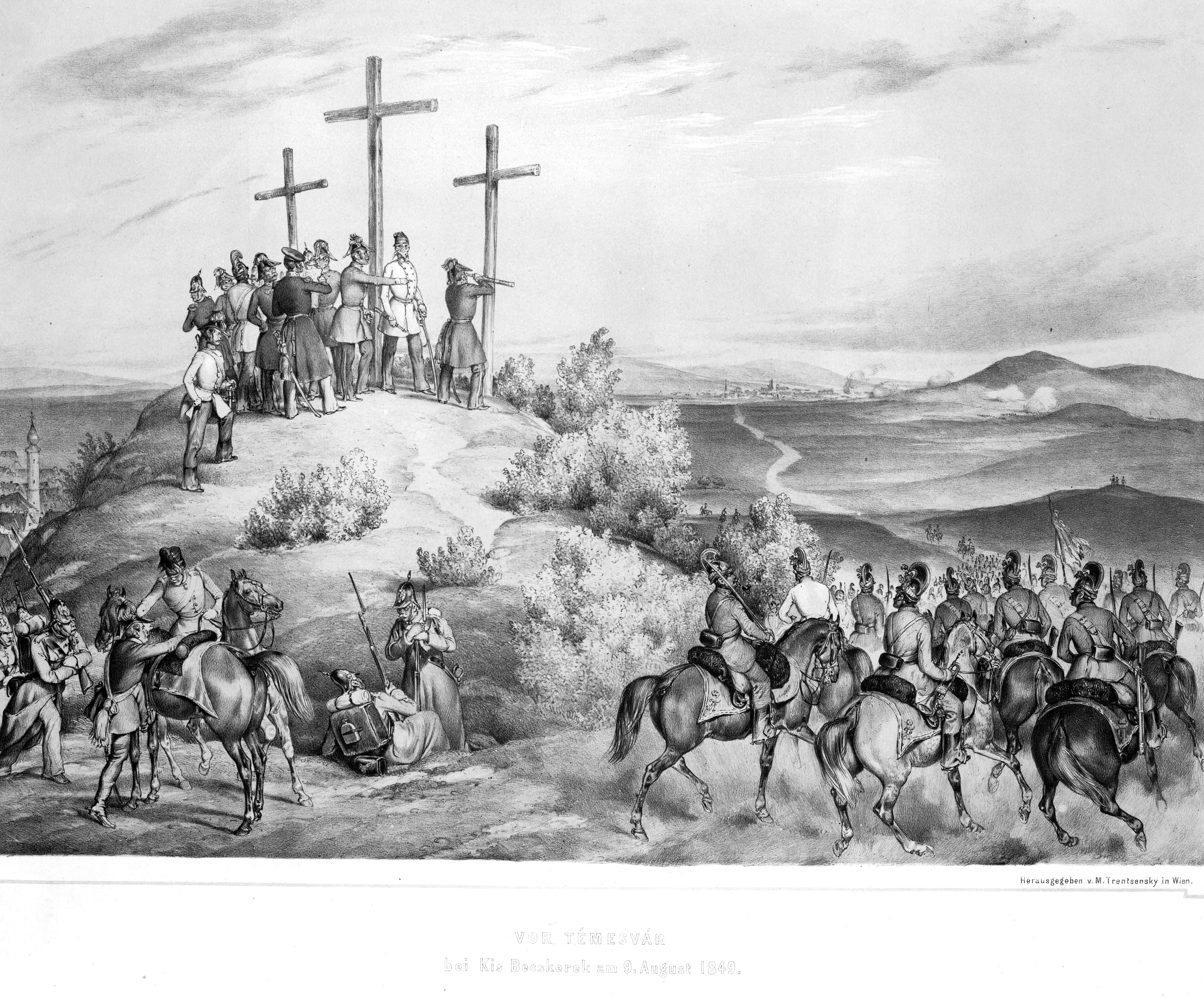
Julius Jacob von Haynau and his army on campaign near Kisbecskerek in 1849, during the Hungarian Revolution

Becicherecu Mic is mentioned as early as 1232 by the name terra Potkerequ. A hundred years later, in 1334, the parish of Pechkereky pays the Vatican the "papal tithe", a grant from believers to support armed action against pagans. During the Hungarian occupation, in 1462, the village is given to the Hagymásy family from Beregsău. During the Turkish occupation (1552–1716), the name of the settlement would have been Crucea ("cross"), the hearth of the village being probably located on the Cross Hill. After the reconquest of Banat by the Habsburg Empire, in 1717, the imperial administration records the settlement with the name Peschered, in Romanian Pescăreț ("pond with fish"). In 1723, in County Mercy's Karte des Temeswarer Banates (see online), the settlement appears for the first time under the name Becicherecu Mic. Its origin comes by rhotacism from the proper noun Pechereky, the name of a landowner. First German settlers arrive here in 1727. In 1748, 24 Romanian families brought from Transylvania were also colonized here. Between 1920 and 1925, the village was named Țichindeal, after scholar Dimitrie Țichindeal, born here in 1775.

== Demographics ==
Ethnic composition (2021)
1. Romanians (75.7%)
2. Roma (2.12%)
3. Serbs (1.84%)
4. Ukrainians (1.84%)
5. Hungarians (1.18%)
6. Unknown (16.0%)
7. Others (1.34%)
Religious composition (2021)
1. Orthodox (65.7%)
2. Pentecostals (6.40%)
3. Roman Catholics (4.03%)
4. Serbian Orthodox (2.36%)
5. Baptists (1.60%)
6. Unknown (17.2%)
7. Others (1.80%)
8. Irreligious, atheists and agnostics (0.83%)

Becicherecu Mic had a population of 2,875 inhabitants at the 2021 census, up 0.77% from the 2011 census. Most inhabitants are Romanians (75.68%), larger minorities being represented by Roma (2.12%), Serbs (1.84%), Ukrainians (1.84%) and Hungarians (1.18%). For 16% of the population, ethnicity is unknown. The village was previously divided into four parts, although in recent decades the inhabitants have mixed: the "German bend" – towards the railway station, the "Serbian bend" – practically in the center of the village, the "Romanian bend" – around the Romanian church and the "Gypsy outskirts" or Chertiz, a group of specific houses, along with Serbs and Romanians. At the end of World War II many of the German inhabitants left the village because of Soviet occupation. The inhabitants traveled through Yugoslavia and Hungary for about seven weeks to get to Austria on 1 November 1944. The inhabitants were then assigned families to stay with.

By religion, most inhabitants are Orthodox (65.73%), but there are also minorities of Pentecostals (6.4%), Roman Catholics (4.03%), Serbian Orthodox (2.36%) and Baptists (1.6%). For 17.25% of the population, religious affiliation is unknown.

Census		Ethnic composition
Year	Population	Romanians	Hungarians	Germans	Roma	Ukrainians	Serbs
1880	3,379	428	21	2,395	–	–	498
1890	3,687	403	25	2,651	–	–	562
1900	3,738	422	40	2,659	–	–	557
1910	3,666	421	95	2,531	–	–	546
1920	3,642	382	70	2,533	–	–	–
1930	3,318	431	35	2,294	83	–	461
1941	3,098	436	20	2,142	–	–	–
1956	2,564	–	–	–	–	–	–
1966	2,693	1,544	12	734	69	68	250
1977	2,774	1,741	18	619	107	63	208
1992	2,316	1,913	26	94	98	53	125
2002	2,417	2,062	31	48	132	74	63
2011	2,853	2,382	43	33	80	40	51
2021	2,875	2,176	34	26	61	53	53

== Politics and administration ==
The commune of Becicherecu Mic is administered by a mayor and a local council composed of 13 councilors. The mayor, Raimond-Ovidiu Rusu, from the Social Democratic Party, has been in office since 2012. As from the 2024 local elections, the local council has the following composition by political parties:

Party	Seats	Composition
Social Democratic Party	8	
Save Romania Union	2	
Alliance for the Union of Romanians	1	
Social Liberal Humanist Party	1	
National Liberal Party	1	

== Economy ==
The economic activity is a consistent one, supported at local level by 223 firms active in fields such as agriculture, trade, production, software, construction and iron processing, among others.

The agricultural area of the commune consists of 3,464 ha (8,560 acres) of arable land on which grains are grown: wheat, maize, barley, two-rowed barley, sunflower and rapeseed; 2 ha (4.9 acres) of orchards with fruit trees and pasture that covers an area of 418 ha (1,030 acres).

== Notable people ==
- Dimitrie Țichindeal (1775–1818), priest, teacher and fabulist
- Ștefan Orbulescu (1929–2007), poet and publicist
- Aurel Șunda (b. 1957), footballer and manager
