= Orțișoara =

- Commune
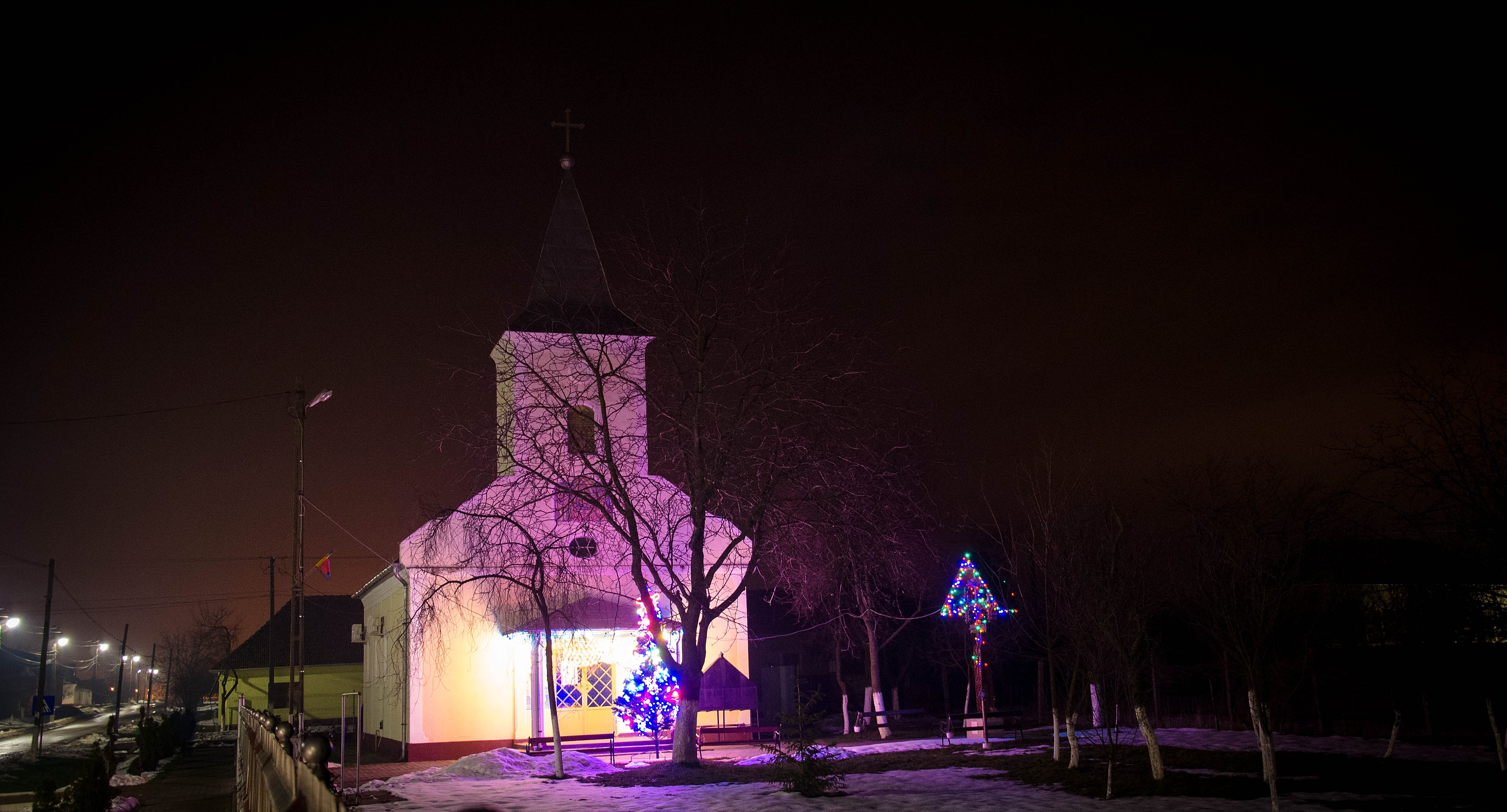
- The Orthodox church in Orțișoara

- Location in Timiș County

- Location in Romania
- Coordinates: 45°58′N 21°12′E
- Country: Romania
- County: Timiș

Government
  - Mayor (2024–): Lucian Ivănescu (PNL)
- Area: 143.23 km^{2} (55.30 sq mi)
- Population (2021-12-01): 4,104
  - Density: 28.65/km^{2} (74.21/sq mi)
- Time zone: UTC+02:00 (EET)
  - Summer (DST): UTC+03:00 (EEST)
- Postal code: 307305–307308
- Vehicle reg.: TM
- Website: www.primariaortisoara.ro

Orțișoara (archaically Cocota; German: Orczydorf/Kokota; Hungarian: Orczyfalva/Kakad; Serbian: Кокода, romanized: Kokoda) is a commune in Timiș County, Romania. It is composed of four villages: Călacea, Cornești, Orțișoara (commune seat) and Seceani.

== Geography ==
Orțișoara is located in the northern part of Timiș County, about 24 km (15 mi) from Timișoara. The commune's area falls within the Piedmont Plain of Vinga, part of the Tisa Plain. This high plain, fragmented by piedmont valleys and numerous crevices, allows the subdivision of the area into three sectors:

- the Seceani sector, which has the highest altitude in the Vinga Piedmont Plain (187.7 m or 616 ft at the Luda Bara point), exhibits fairly narrow plateaus, fragmented by valley 40–80 m (130–260 ft) deep and 20–70 m (66–230 ft) wide, with slopes in general accentuated;
- the Orțișoara–Vinga sector, with an altitude between 150 and 170 m (490 and 560 ft), has a more attenuated relief energy than the previous sector, wider plateaus and lower slopes;
- the Călacea–Bărăteaz–Satchinez sector, with an altitude between 100 and 130 m (330 and 430 ft), is the lowest portion that makes, starting from the western part of Călacea, the very smooth passage to the low plain, with very wide plateaus and a small fragmentation of the land.

=== Hydrography ===
The perimeter of the commune belongs to the Bega–Beregsău river basin.

In the eastern part of Seceani, all the valleys converge towards the Măgheruș stream, which has a permanent course, but with a fluctuating flow, during the rainy autumns and springs the whole meadow being flooded. The stream fixed its course on a tectonic line, which led to the appearance of a series of mineralized springs and several mud volcanoes whose bubbling is due to the strong outflows of cold gases from inside the earth. The area is also drained by the Iercici stream which has a sinuous and permanent course, with a wide meadow that in many places exceeds 200–300 m (660–980 ft) in width, as well as by a series of valleys with intermittent flows such as Apa Mare, Valea Vinelor, Luda Bara, Valea Lacului and Valea Carani.

=== Flora ===
Spontaneous flora is characteristic of the forest-steppe area.

Uncultivated woody vegetation is poorly represented by isolated specimens or small clusters of species such as Populus nigra (black poplar), Tilia cordata (small-leaved linden), Acer platanoides (Norway maple), Robinia pseudoacacia (black locust), Rosa canina (dog rose), Crataegus monogyna (hawthorn), Ligustrum vulgare (privet) and Prunus spinosa (blackthorn). The most common fruit trees are represented by plum, walnut, apple, quince, etc.

The grassy vegetation present on the phreatic-hydromorphic soils in the meadow areas is dominated by species such as Amaranthus albus (tumbleweed), Agrostis gigantea (black bent), Bromus arvensis (field brome), Cynodon dactylon (dog's tooth grass), Lolium perenne (ryegrass), Dactylis glomerata (cock's-foot), Alopecurus pratensis (meadow foxtail), Festuca pratensis (meadow fescue), Poa bulbosa (bulbous bluegrass), Symphytum officinale (comfrey), Echinochloa crus-galli (cockspur), Phragmites spp. (reeds), etc. On salty soils are common Trifolium fragiferum (strawberry clover), Puccinellia distans (weeping alkaligrass), Limonium gmelinii (Siberian statice), Champhorosma ovata and Matricaria chamomilla (chamomile). In the depressions of the high plain there are species such as Anagallis arvensis (scarlet pimpernel), Cirsium arvense (field thistle), Centaurea cyanus (cornflower), Galium verum (yellow bedstraw), Plantago lanceolata (ribwort plantain), Rumex crispus (curly dock) and Rubus caesius (dewberry). In the flat area of the high plain, on automorphic soils, there are mainly specimens of Nonea pulla (monkswort), Vicia spp. (vetches), Senecio vulgaris (groundsel) and Rubus caesius (dewberry).

== History ==
=== Orțișoara ===
In the Middle Ages, on the site of today's Orțișoara, there was a settlement called Kokoth, the first records of which are found in 1318, when András, the son of Miklós Kokaachi, appears as its owner. The old name is mentioned later in Marsigli's notes (1690) and on Count Mercy's map (1723). In Serbian, кокот/kokot means "rooster"; Orțișoara was famed for the roosters traded here in the Middle Ages.

The medieval village was destroyed by the Turks in the 16th century. It was re-established in 1784–1786. At that time, under the reign of Emperor Joseph II, 200 families of German colonists from Lorraine, Saarland, Rhineland-Palatinate, Württemberg and Bavaria settled here. Responsible for the colonization was Baron Georg Orczy, prefect and participant in the siege of Timișoara in 1716. Therefore, the village was named in his honor – Orczydorf ("Orczy's village"). The first ethnic German to settle in the new village was Fidelis Teufel; he was only called by the first name Fidelis, because the name Teufel, which meant "devil", did not suit him. He later became the mayor of the commune, his grave being still found today in the commune's cemetery. Orțișoara was a cameral property from 1785 to 1836, when Baron Georgios Sinas bought the village. After the revolution of 1848–1849, patrimonial rule was abolished in Orțișoara.

=== Călacea ===
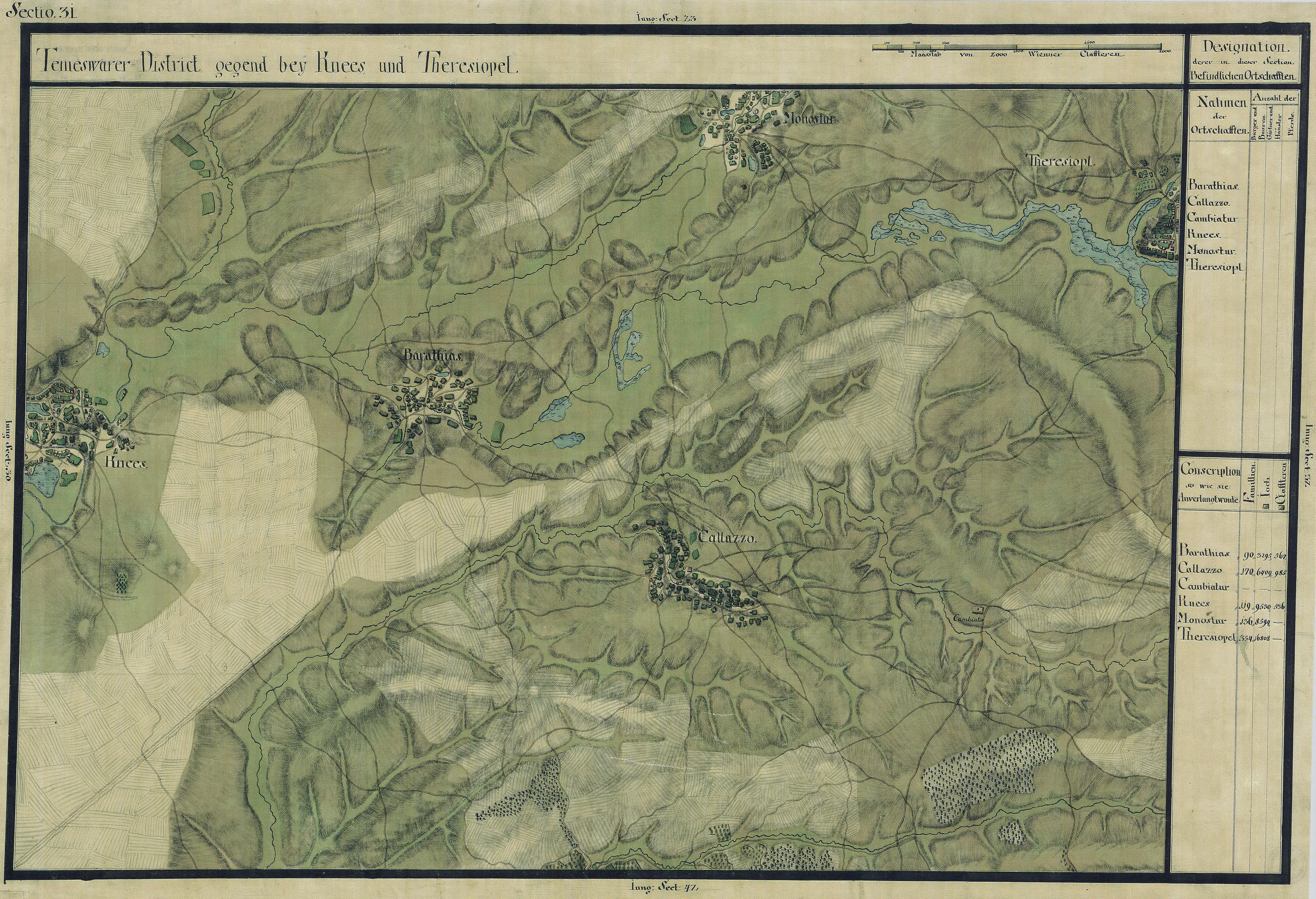
Călacea (Callazzo) in the Josephinische Landesaufnahme of 1769–1772

Calacea was first mentioned in 1311 as Kalandava. Later, there were several mentions in documents about local noblemen and landowners (in 1341, with the name of Kalacha, in 1349, 1414, etc.). Documents about Călacea are missing from the Ottoman period.

After the occupation of Banat by the Habsburgs, the reorganization of Banat began and the first general conscription took place, in 1718, elaborated under the command of Count Mercy. Călacea is not mentioned in this conscription. Instead, on the map drawn up in 1723, appears the inhabited commune of Kallacs, in the district of Timișoara. It also appears on Griselini's map of 1776, with the name of Callazo, and in Korabinsky's dictionary with the name of Callatzo, with the specification that the population was made up of Romanians.

The parish chronicle from 1758 records the existence of a wooden church, which was dedicated to the Holy Martyr George. This wooden church was replaced by a new brick one completed in 1829.

In the effort to colonize Banat, Empress Maria Theresa issued on 24 July 1765 an order for the dislocation of the Romanian native villages and their relocation to regions with a compact Romanian population. Following this order, the Romanians from Aradu Nou, Felnac and Sânpetru were displaced. The governor of Banat, Perlas Rialph, submitted to the empress a memorandum proposing the relocation of several Romanian villages: Murani, Jadani, Calacea, Seceani, Săcălaz, etc. The natives of several villages vehemently opposed and managed to escape the displacement. Săcălaz, for example, was moved from its hearth, while Călacea managed to stay.

The Călacea estate was for a period of time owned by Greek-Austrian banker Georgios Sinas. He maintained good relations with the Romanians from Călacea, but also with other important Romanians from the empire, such as Andrei Șaguna. He devoted himself to several acts of charity in favor of the Romanians from Călacea, among which he also supported the Romanian library.

=== Cornești ===
Cornești is one of the oldest villages in Banat, whose first recorded mention dates from 1233, when it belonged to the Timișoara Fortress. The name of the village was Jadani (alternatively Jădani) for most of its existence, today's name being assigned administratively in 1960, as the original name was considered unaesthetic.

Historian Nicolae Ilieșiu (1921) shows that in a diploma from 1318 is mentioned that "the mayor of Zadane village is a Vlach, named George, a witness in a possession process". Jadani is also mentioned in the papal tithe records of 1334–1337 as Sadan. At the conscription carried out by the Austrians after the conquest of Banat in 1717, Jadani was inhabited and had 10 houses. In 1761 the village seems to have been uninhabited, but in 1783 it was populated again. Later, Germans and Hungarians also settled here, but Romanians continued to be in the majority.

=== Seceani ===
Traces from the Roman period have been discovered on the territory of the locality, but today's Seceani dates from the Middle Ages, most probably being mentioned for the first time in a document from 1256, with the name Zechin. In the papal tithe records of 1333–1335 it is mentioned as Zeche.

The locality was formed from the merger of several hamlets, which appear mentioned in the medieval documents: Secianiul Mic, Secianul Mare, Macova and others. About the establishment of the village, Nicolae Ilieșiu writes that it existed since the 13th–15th centuries, "on a place cleared by Vlachs". In 1582 it is mentioned that several Serbs also lived here, but they either left or partly Romanianized. This is also known from the fact that the name of the village was Serbianized: Мали Сечањ/Mali Sečanj (Secianiul Mic) and Велики Сечањ/Veliki Sečanj (Secianul Mare).

== Demographics ==
Ethnic composition (2021)
1. Romanians (84.7%)
2. Hungarians (1.24%)
3. Unknown (13.0%)
4. Others (1.04%)
Religious composition (2021)
1. Orthodox (67.5%)
2. Pentecostals (11.7%)
3. Roman Catholics (3.50%)
4. Baptists (1.24%)
5. Unknown (13.8%)
6. Others (1.66%)
7. Irreligious, atheists and agnostics (0.58%)

Orțișoara had a population of 4,104 inhabitants at the 2021 census, down 2.05% from the 2011 census. Most inhabitants are Romanians (84.74%), with a minority of Hungarians (1.24%). For 12.98% of the population, ethnicity is unknown. By religion, most inhabitants are Orthodox (67.49%), but there are also minorities of Pentecostals (11.72%), Roman Catholics (3.5%) and Baptists (1.24%). For 13.81% of the population, religious affiliation is unknown.

Census		Ethnic composition
Year	Population	Romanians	Hungarians	Germans	Roma	Ukrainians	Serbs
1880	6,879	3,558	320	2,919	–	–	38
1890	7,175	3,477	454	3,154	–	–	41
1900	6,900	3,599	416	2,858	–	–	18
1910	6,186	3,574	325	2,259	–	–	7
1920	5,943	3,394	253	2,277	–	–	–
1930	5,982	3,548	306	2,070	33	–	13
1941	5,855	3,611	300	1,916	–	–	–
1956	5,406	3,647	374	1,363	1	–	13
1966	5,360	3,765	372	1,203	–	12	1
1977	5,170	3,893	325	903	16	27	5
1992	4,105	3,667	203	149	20	48	7
2002	4,080	3,775	155	63	43	20	7
2011	4,190	3,773	101	31	35	–	7
2021	4,104	3,478	51	15	11	5	–

== Politics and administration ==
The commune of Orțișoara is administered by a mayor and a local council composed of 13 councilors. The mayor, Lucian Ivănescu, from the National Liberal Party, has been in office since 2024. As from the 2024 local elections, the local council has the following composition by political parties:

Party	Seats	Composition
National Liberal Party	5	
Social Democratic Party	4	
Social Liberal Humanist Party	2	
Save Romania Union	1	
Alliance for the Union of Romanians	1	

== Points of interest ==
=== Călacea Baths ===
Călacea Baths (Romanian: Băile Călacea) are a balneo-climatic resort of general interest. The thermal waters here have temperatures between 38 and 40 °C (100 and 104 °F), being recommended for diseases of the musculoskeletal system, for the peripheral nervous system, for degenerative rheumatic diseases, as well as for gastritis or hepato-biliary diseases. The resort's leisure area includes a swimming place with an Olympic-size thermal pool and various sports grounds. The park in the resort occupies an area of almost 14 ha (35 acres), with secular trees, a forest of locusts, spruces and other plant species. Inside the park at Călacea Baths there is a lake with white water lilies and a small zoo.

=== Prehistoric fortress of Cornești-Iarcuri ===
Considered the largest fortification from the Bronze Age in Europe, it occupies an area of over 1,700 ha (4,200 acres). The fortress was probably built c. 1500 BC by communities of Cruceni–Belegiš culture and ceased to be used in 1000 BC. It would have been burned when it was abandoned, so that the former inhabitants would not be tempted to return. The fortress consists of four concentric rings. They are in fact the walls of the fortress, built with the help of wooden pillars on which earth was added. They are still visible today, although they have been leveled by intensive agriculture. The fortress is so big compared to others, that the Timișoara Fortress had only the size of its smallest ring. Inside the fortification were discovered an access gate provided with four-meter-high (13 ft) defense towers, the ruins of an ancient temple, Sarmatian tombs, pottery workshops and a settlement dating from the 3rd or 4th century.

The fortification first appeared on a map in the 17th century, but only two of the inner rings had been discovered at the time. In the 19th century, the third circle was discovered and, more recently, in 1973, the fourth came to light. The fortress was first researched by Ioachim Miloia in 1932 and then by Marius Moga in 1939. Most sources up to Ioachim Miloia considered the fortress an Avar ring, a fortification built by the Avar remnants that retreated to the east after their defeat by Charlemagne. Another hypothesis, supported by Constantin Răileanu in 1981, but refuted by Florin Medeleț, considered the ruins as the remains of the city of Tema, mentioned in Anonymus Ravennas' Cosmography. More recent research suggests that the fortress of Cornești-Iarcuri belonged to a population of farmers and animal breeders, who controlled the main access roads to various areas rich in raw materials (salt in Transylvania, gold in the Apuseni Mountains, copper in the Banat Mountains). From a strategic point of view, the fortification is halfway between the Timiș and Mureș river basins, the main access road to Transylvania. It is not excluded that this fortification to be a construction with an important role of prestige for the warrior elites from the end of the Bronze Age, in the north of Banat.

=== Seceani Mud Volcanoes ===
Called forocici or bolboroace by locals, they are located on a grassland between Seceani (Orțișoara commune) and Fibiș (Pișchia commune). The water collected in the craters in the field "boils" due to the presence of carbon dioxide. The largest crater is not very deep, just over one meter (3.3 ft), and is called Hell's Mouth (Romanian: Gura Iadului). In the past, the locals from Seceani and Pișchia came here to be cured of rheumatism.

== Notable people ==
- Adolf Lendl (1862–1943), zoologist
- Vasile Lăzărescu (1894–1969), metropolitan
- Aurel Leucuția (1894–1964), lawyer and Minister of Economy (1944–1945)
