= Șagu =

- Commune
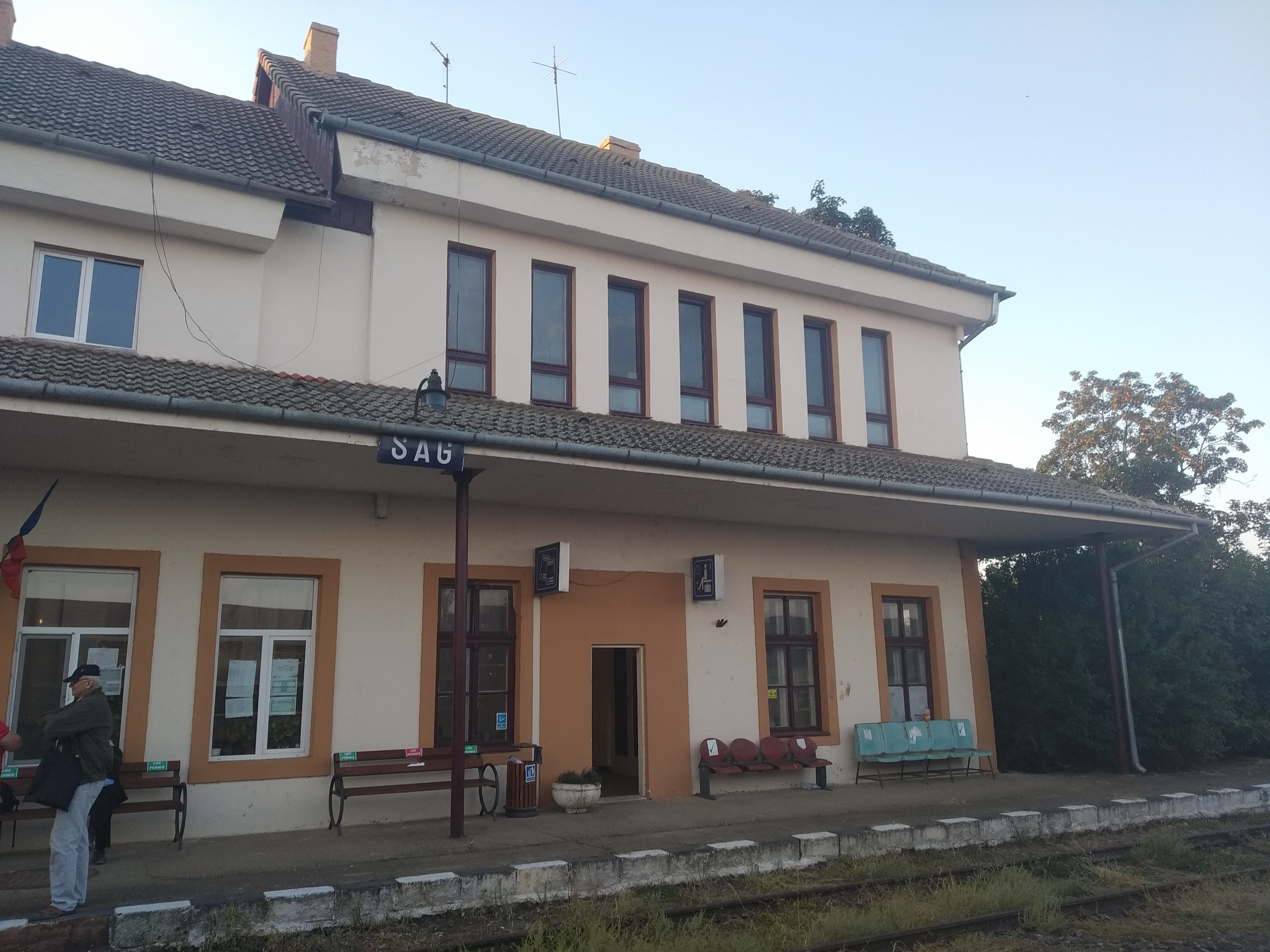
- Șagu railway station

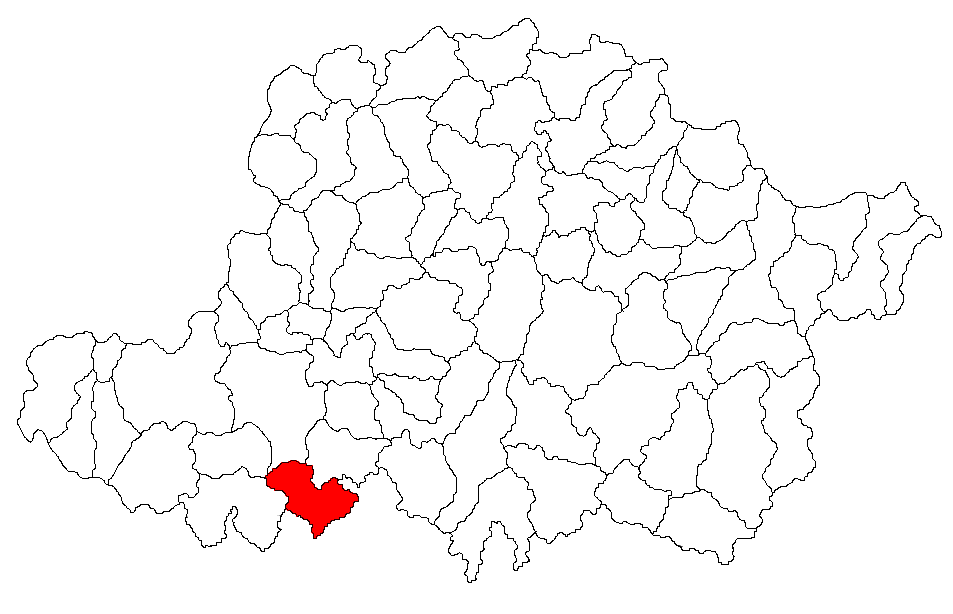
- Location in Arad County

- Location in Romania
- Coordinates: 46°03′N 21°17′E
- Country: Romania
- County: Arad

Government
  - Mayor (2024–2028): Emilia Brăneț (PNL)
- Area: 102.66 km^{2} (39.64 sq mi)
- Elevation: 133 m (436 ft)
- Population (2021-12-01): 3,863
  - Density: 37.63/km^{2} (97.46/sq mi)
- Time zone: UTC+02:00 (EET)
  - Summer (DST): UTC+03:00 (EEST)
- Postal code: 317310
- Area code: (+40) 0257
- Vehicle reg.: AR
- Website: primariasagu.ro

Șagu (Hungarian: Németság, German: Segenthau) is a commune in Arad County, Romania, is situated on the Vingăi Plateau and it stretches over 10,266 ha (25,370 acres). It is composed of five villages: Cruceni (Temeskeresztes; Kreuzstätten), Firiteaz (Féregyház), Fiscut (Temesfűzkút), Hunedoara Timișană, and Șagu (situated at 15 km from Arad).

== Population ==
Historical population
Year	Pop.	±%
1880	4,837	—
1910	5,157	+6.6%
1966	5,070	−1.7%
1977	5,095	+0.5%
1992	3,858	−24.3%
2002	3,862	+0.1%
2011	3,776	−2.2%
2021	3,863	+2.3%
Source: Census data

According to the 2002 census, commune had 3,862 inhabitants, out of which 91.5% were Romanians, 3.8% Hungarians, 2.7% Roma, 1.2% Germans, and 0.8% were of other or undeclared nationalities. At the 2021 census, Șagu had a population of 3,863; of those, 82.68% were Romanians, 6.94% Roma, and 1.63% Hungarians.

== History ==
The first documentary record of Șagu dates back to 1333. Cruceni was attested documentarily in 1772, Firiteaz in 1256, Fiscut in 1493, while Hunedoara Timișană in 1925.

== Natives ==
- Mathias Bernath (1920–2013), historian and academic
