= Săcălaz =

- Commune
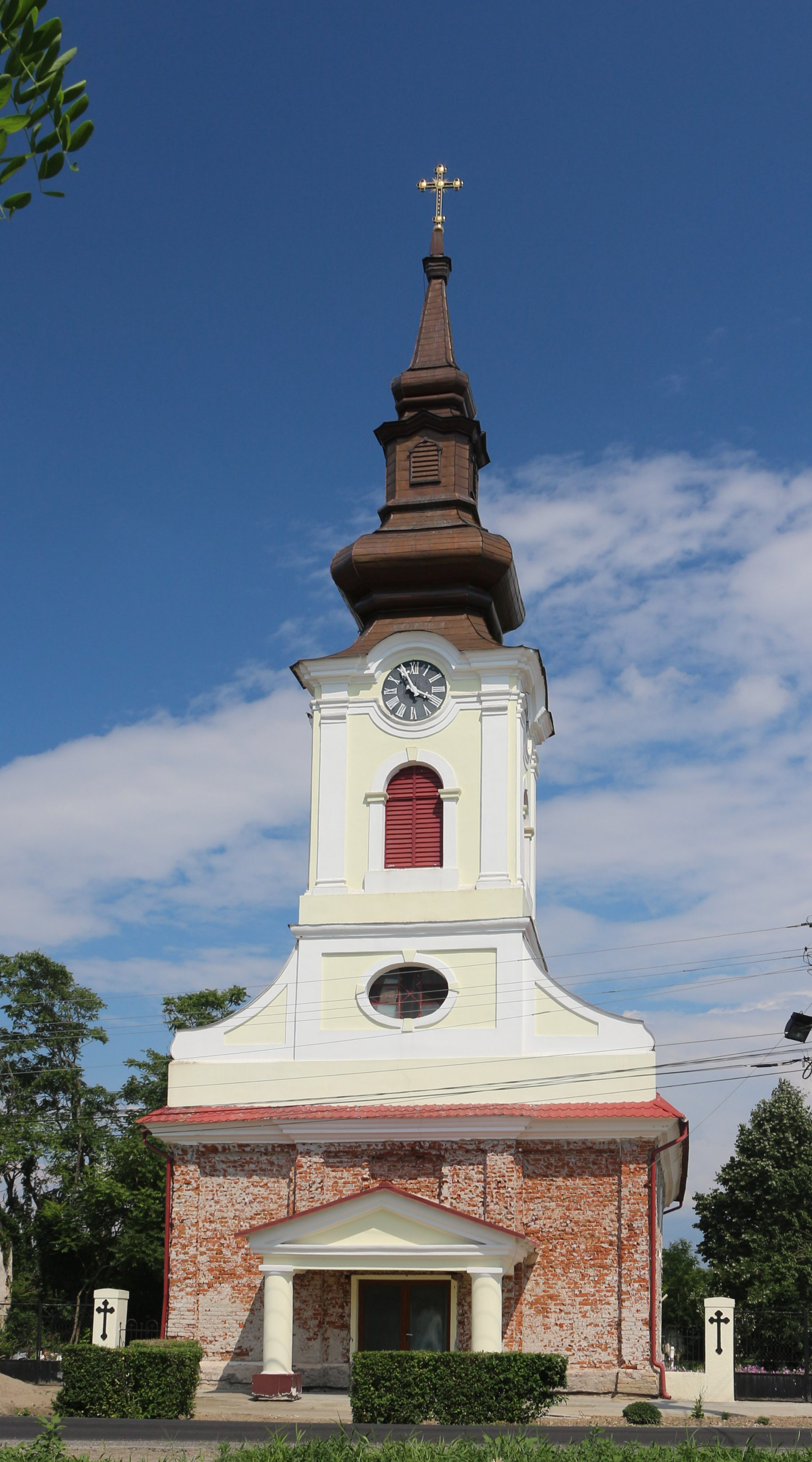
- The Orthodox church in Beregsău Mare

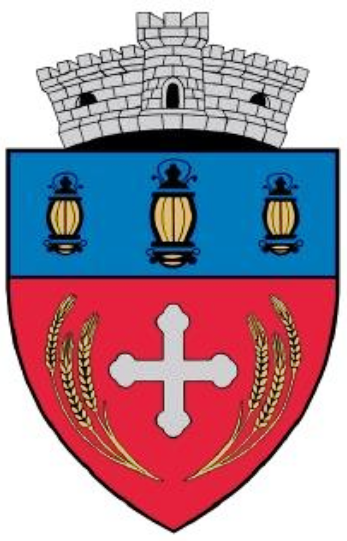
- Coat of arms

- Location in Timiș County

- Location in Romania
- Coordinates: 45°45′37″N 21°06′43″E
- Country: Romania
- County: Timiș

Government
  - Mayor (2024–): Dumitru Boboi (PSD)
- Area: 136.1 km^{2} (52.5 sq mi)
- Population (2021-12-01): 9,223
  - Density: 67.77/km^{2} (175.5/sq mi)
- Time zone: UTC+02:00 (EET)
  - Summer (DST): UTC+03:00 (EEST)
- Postal code: 307370–307372
- Vehicle reg.: TM
- Website: primariasacalaz.ro

Săcălaz (formerly Săcalhaz; German: Sackelhausen; Banat Swabian: Sacklass; Hungarian: Szakálháza) is a commune in Timiș County, Romania. It is composed of three villages: Beregsău Mare, Beregsău Mic and Săcălaz (commune seat).

== Geography ==
Săcălaz is located 10 km (6.2 mi) west of Timișoara and covers an area of 136.1 km^{2} (52.5 mi^{2}). The relief is flat. The Timiș River is the most important running water, Săcălaz also being crossed by the waters of two small streams, Beregsău Mare and Niarad.

== History ==
Săcălaz was first mentioned in a diploma from 29 December 1392, in which the boundary of the village of Zakalhaza was delimited, a name that it kept until 1520. Following the Austro-Turkish War (1716–1718) the Banat localities became the property of the Austrian Imperial House. Banat became an autonomous Austrian province with military administration, being divided into 11 districts. In 1717 Săcălaz had 66 houses. The main occupation of the inhabitants was the cultivation of cereals, especially wheat and maize. In 1725, the first grain mill was built.

In 1765 the first wave of Swabian German settlers arrived here, by order of Maria Theresa. She issued the Kolonisationspatent of 25 February 1763 and later the Decree which she submitted to the Banat Colonization Office in 1765, ordering the relocation of the Romanian population to the southern part of Torontál County, to make way for the Swabian settlers. Thus, the Romanian population of about 60 families is forced to leave Săcălaz and move to Torak (in Serbian Banat), where they establish a new settlement. In turn, the village of Beregsău Mic was colonized with Serbs. The following waves of German settlers (1744–1772, 1782–1787) definitively established the German predominance of the locality. The plans for the development of Săcălaz were outlined on paper in Vienna, in the form of a chessboard, with the Catholic church in the center. The church was designed by engineer Carl Alexander Steinlein and was consecrated in 1772.

== Demographics ==
Ethnic composition (2021)
1. Romanians (71.0%)
2. Serbs (1.07%)
3. Unknown (26.3%)
4. Others (1.67%)
Religious composition (2021)
1. Orthodox (60.7%)
2. Pentecostals (5.05%)
3. Roman Catholics (2.33%)
4. Unknown (27.8%)
5. Others (3.30%)
6. Irreligious, atheists and agnostics (0.87%)

Săcălaz had a population of 9,223 inhabitants at the 2021 census, up 28.02% from the 2011 census. Most inhabitants are Romanians (70.97%), with a minority of Serbs (1.07%). For 26.29% of the population, ethnicity is unknown. By religion, most inhabitants are Orthodox (60.7%), but there are also minorities of Pentecostals (5.05%) and Roman Catholics (2.33%). For 27.75% of the population, religious affiliation is unknown.

| Census | | Ethnic composition |
| Year | Population | Romanians | Hungarians | Germans | Serbs |
|---|---|---|---|---|---|
| 1880 | 6,218 | 1,935 | 97 | 3,245 | 926 |
| 1890 | 7,257 | 2,158 | 104 | 4,019 | 928 |
| 1900 | 7,475 | 2,087 | 197 | 4,202 | 948 |
| 1910 | 7,178 | 2,104 | 273 | 3,853 | 944 |
| 1920 | 7,141 | 1,855 | 174 | 4,169 | – |
| 1930 | 6,649 | 2,088 | 134 | 3,601 | 792 |
| 1941 | 6,700 | 2,212 | 60 | 3,553 | – |
| 1956 | 6,116 | 2,911 | 119 | 2,363 | 717 |
| 1966 | 6,774 | 3,674 | 140 | 2,303 | 645 |
| 1977 | 7,287 | 4,588 | 160 | 1,997 | 477 |
| 1992 | 5,926 | 5,368 | 111 | 76 | 293 |
| 2002 | 6,273 | 5,903 | 92 | 40 | 152 |
| 2011 | 7,204 | 6,045 | 67 | 41 | 143 |
| 2021 | 9,223 | 6,546 | 77 | 18 | 99 |

== Politics and administration ==
The commune of Săcălaz is administered by a mayor and a local council composed of 17 councilors. The mayor, Dumitru Boboi, from the Social Democratic Party, has been in office since 2024. As from the 2024 local elections, the local council has the following composition by political parties:

| Party | Seats | Composition |
|---|---|---|
| Social Democratic Party | 8 | |
| Alliance for the Union of Romanians | 5 | |
| National Liberal Party | 2 | |
| Save Romania Union–People's Movement Party–Force of the Right | 2 | |

== Notable people ==
- Aurel Cosma (1867–1931), lawyer and politician
- Josef Linster (1889–1954), composer, music teacher and folklorist
- Ernő Kállai (1890–1954), art critic
- Heinrich Lauer (1934–2010), writer and journalist
- Karl Fritz Lauer (1938–2018), agronomist
- Gerhard Ortinau (b. 1953), writer
- Carl Gibson (b. 1959), author and civil rights activist
