= Satchinez =

- Commune
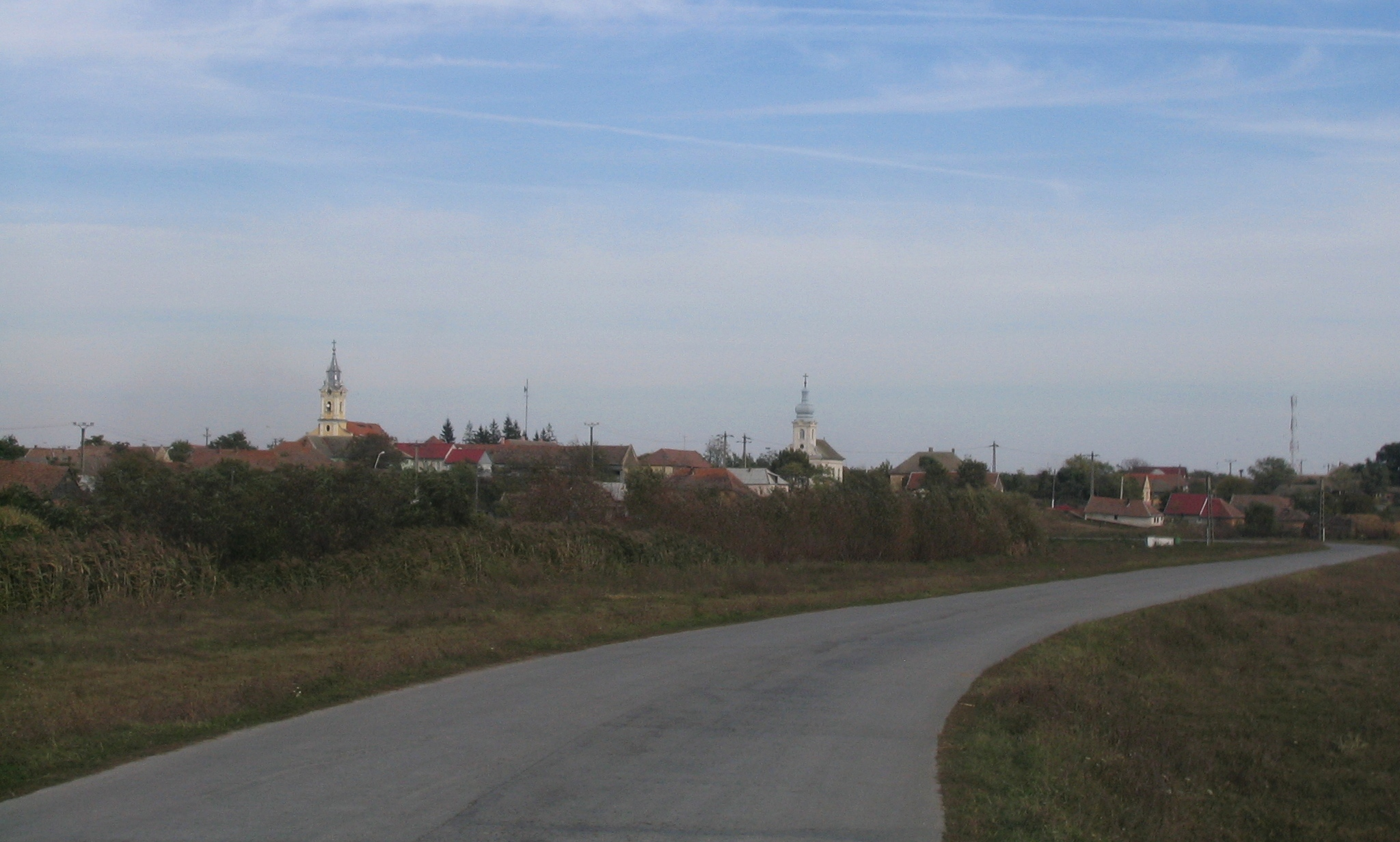
- Overview of Satchinez

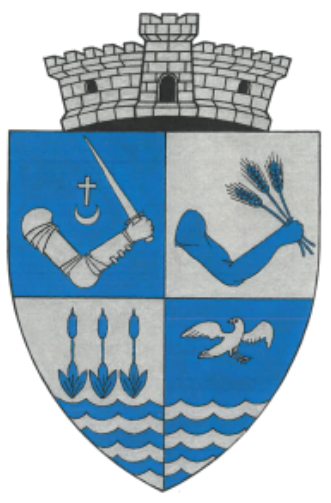
- Coat of arms

- Location in Timiș County

- Location in Romania
- Coordinates: 45°56′N 21°2′E
- Country: Romania
- County: Timiș

Government
  - Mayor (2016–): Florin Olimpiu Cheaua (PNL)
- Area: 110.9 km^{2} (42.8 sq mi)
- Population (2021-12-01): 4,439
  - Density: 40.03/km^{2} (103.7/sq mi)
- Time zone: UTC+02:00 (EET)
  - Summer (DST): UTC+03:00 (EEST)
- Postal code: 307365–307367
- Vehicle reg.: TM
- Website: www.satchinez.ro

Satchinez (formerly just Chinez; Hungarian: Temeskenéz; German: Knees; Romani: Ogav-Chinizitican; Serbian: Кнез, romanized: Knez) is a commune in Timiș County, Romania. It is composed of three villages: Bărăteaz, Hodoni and Satchinez (commune seat).

== History ==
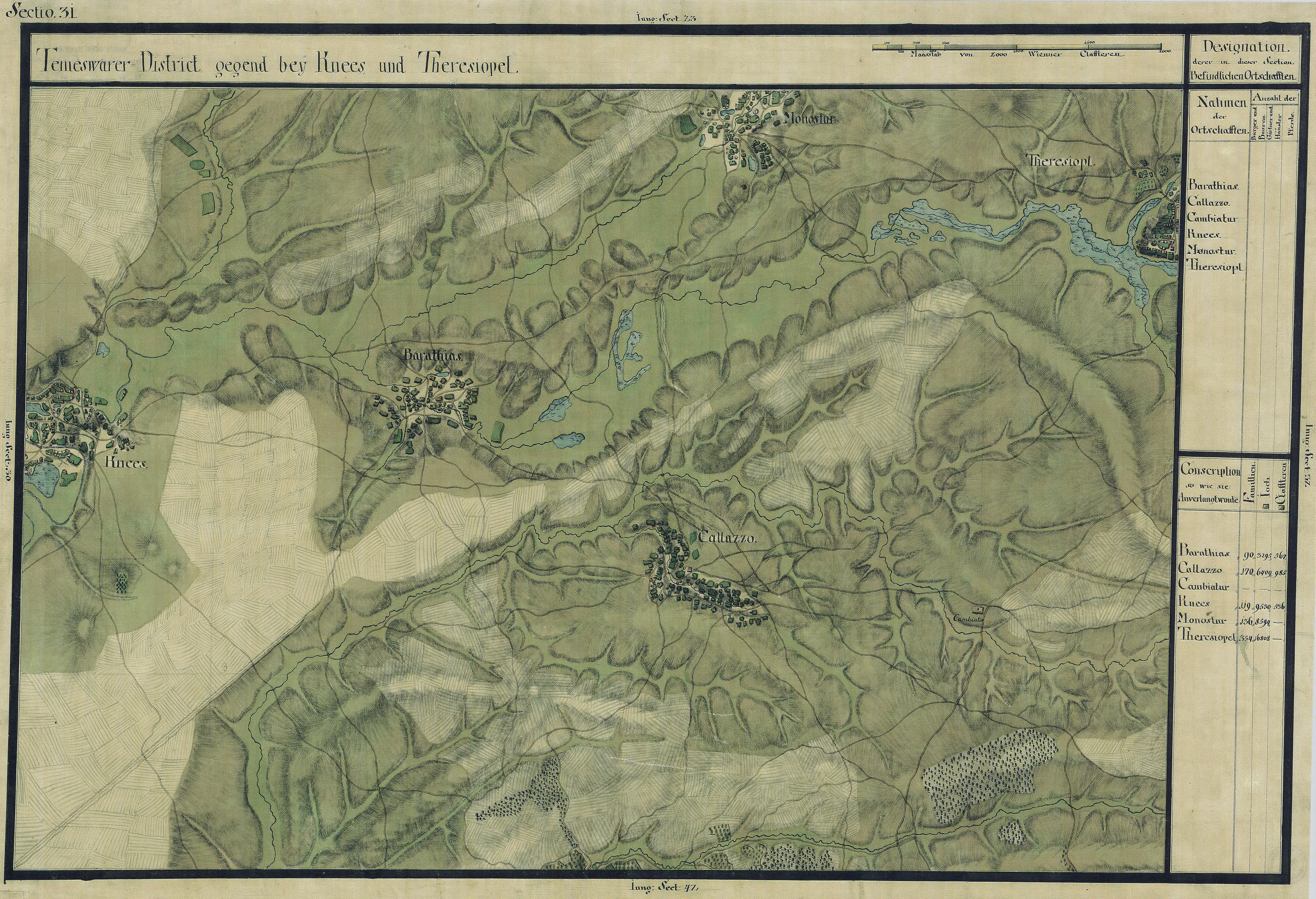
Bărăteaz (Barathias) and Satchinez (Knees) on the Josephinische Landesaufnahme of 1769–1772

The first recorded mention of Satchinez dates from 1230, when it was mentioned as Kenaz. On the papal tithe lists of 1333 it appears with the name Kenes and belonged to Csanád County. The medieval history of the locality is marked by the personality of Pál Kinizsi, who consolidated the fortress here and stood out in the anti-Ottoman struggle. All that is left of Pál Kinizsi's fortress today is a mound shaped like a truncated cone, with a radius of about 50 m (160 ft) and a height of 30 m (98 ft), called Gomila by the locals. In 1786 the locality was colonized by Germans, but the Romanians remain the majority.

Bărăteaz is first mentioned in the diplomas of 1411, and later in those of 1428. In an Ottoman defter from 1554, it is mentioned with 10 houses. On Count Mercy's topographic map, it appears with the name Barabaș and as uninhabited, because the Romanians had taken refuge from the Turks. Historian Nicolae Ilieșiu considers that Bărăteaz was repopulated by Romanians in 1764. On a map from 1785 that included statistics of land properties – Grundes ausweis der Steur Gemeide – and was donated by parish priest Milovan Milivoi from Bărăteaz to the Museum of the Metropolitan of Banat, it appears belonging to the district of Aradu Nou with 99 houses and two horse mills.

Hodoni is first mentioned in 1480 as Odon. György Dózsa's rebels destroyed the locality in 1514. In 1520 the village was owned by Bálint Bolyka. It is also known that during the Turkish rule of Banat, Hodoni had an Orthodox parish. In 1717, when Banat was recaptured by the Habsburg Empire, there were only 15 houses in Hodoni. The establishment of Hodoni village has close ties with the neighboring locality of Sânandrei, where at that time the administration of the Timișoara District had moved. On 21 September 1782, Emperor Joseph II issued a decree of colonization expressing his determination to transfer to Banat German citizens of the empire, especially from the Upper Rhine District, promising them a number of advantages, including free transport from Vienna to the destination colony, houses, arable land, agricultural tools, exemptions from some taxes and other facilities. The chamber administration wanted the Romanians in Sânandrei to be relocated into the "valley called Hodony in ancient times" and to be replaced by German settlers. Vincențiu Babeș wrote in his Romanian Encyclopedia (published in 1898 in Sibiu) that the Romanians forced to move from Sânandrei founded the village Odonii. On 25 June 1785, it was officially renamed Hodony. Beginning in 1849, the Germans began to settle in Hodoni. At that time the owner of the village was the landowner György Manaszy. He brought Germans to his lands to work on the tobacco plantations. Thus, the locality experienced a significant increase and towards the end of the 19th century, it had about 1,600 inhabitants, of which almost half were Germans (Banat Swabians).

== Demographics ==
Ethnic composition (2021)
1. Romanians (80.5%)
2. Roma (8.33%)
3. Unknown (9.97%)
4. Others (1.21%)
Religious composition (2021)
1. Orthodox (77.2%)
2. Pentecostals (7.02%)
3. Baptists (2.11%)
4. Roman Catholics (1.98%)
5. Unknown (10.5%)
6. Others (1.06%)
7. Irreligious, atheists and agnostics (0.09%)

Satchinez had a population of 4,439 inhabitants at the 2021 census, down 6.41% from the 2011 census. Most inhabitants are Romanians (80.49%), with a minority of Roma (8.33%). For 9.97% of the population, ethnicity is unknown. By religion, most inhabitants are Orthodox (77.2%), but there are also minorities of Pentecostals (7.02%), Baptists (2.11%) and Roman Catholics (1.98%). For 10.54% of the population, religious affiliation is unknown.

Census		Ethnic composition
Year	Population	Romanians	Hungarians	Germans	Roma	Serbs
1880	5,678	2,977	73	2,352	–	241
1890	6,097	3,060	54	2,715	–	217
1900	5,588	2,996	99	2,329	–	134
1910	5,186	2,823	112	1,923	–	237
1920	5,528	3,308	40	1,952	–	–
1930	4,623	2,304	50	1,914	159	163
1941	4,703	2,328	31	1,855	–	–
1956	4,622	3,050	20	1,355	32	153
1966	4,455	2,945	39	1,062	274	126
1977	4,771	3,568	43	723	328	97
1992	4,362	3,826	45	107	317	51
2002	4,638	4,098	54	79	351	30
2011	4,743	3,842	54	47	496	25
2021	4,439	3,573	21	9	370	13

== Politics and administration ==
The commune of Satchinez is administered by a mayor and a local council composed of 15 councilors. The mayor, Florin Olimpiu Cheaua, from the National Liberal Party, has been in office since 2016. As from the 2024 local elections, the local council has the following composition by political parties:

Party	Seats	Composition
National Liberal Party	8	
Save Romania Union–People's Movement Party–Force of the Right	3	
Social Democratic Party	2	
Alliance for the Union of Romanians	2	

== Culture ==
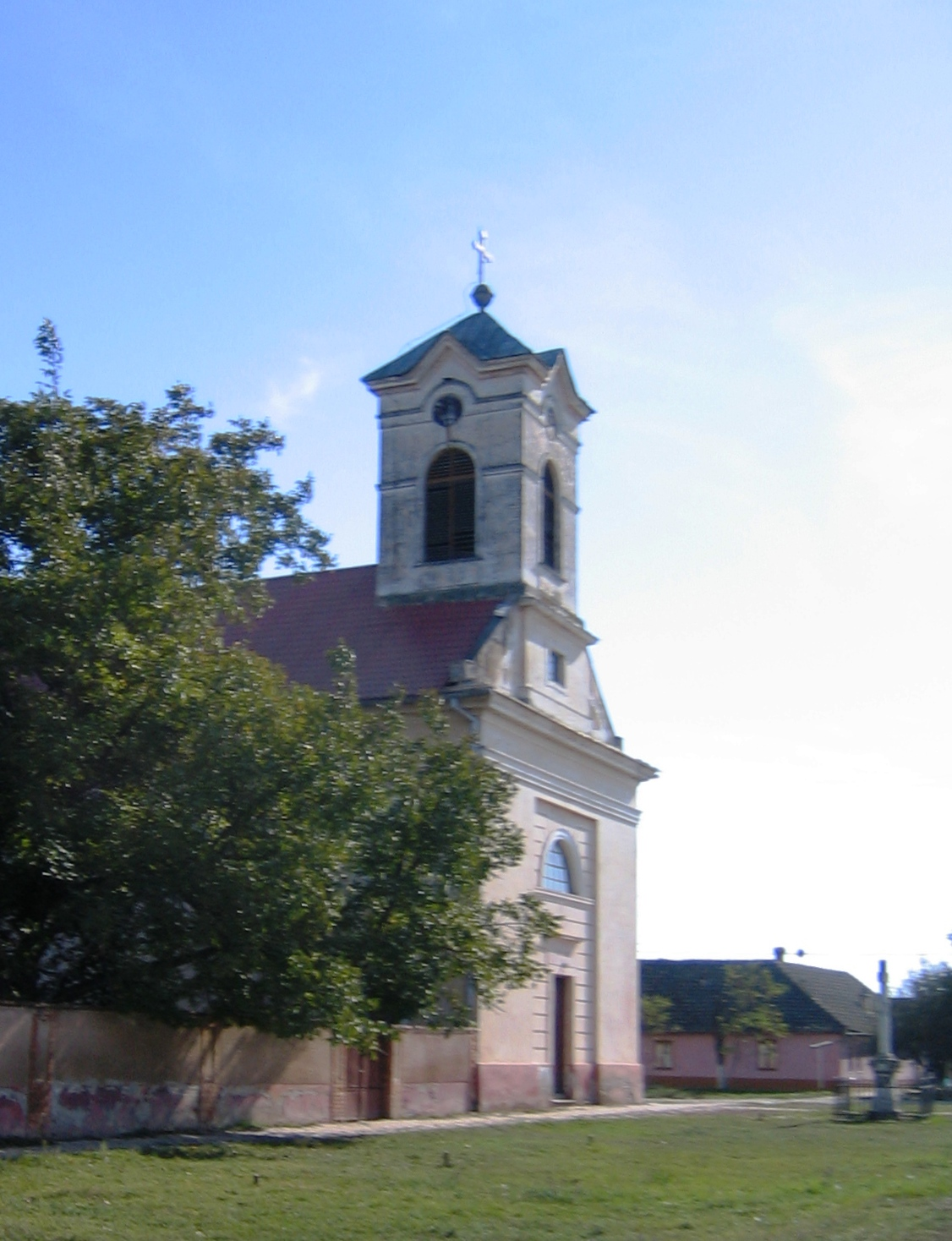
The Roman Catholic church in Satchinez

There are three churches in the village. The oldest is the Romanian Orthodox one, which was established in 1804. The Roman Catholic church was built between 1822 and 1823, and the Serbian Orthodox church in 1889. The Roman Catholic church was consecrated to Teresa of Ávila on 15 October 1823.

The Romanians and Serbs had a trivial school as early as 1777. A German denominational, Roman Catholic school in Satchinez was first mentioned in 1802. The first school building was erected in 1820, and the new school building with two spacious classrooms was built in 1878–1879. Due to the lack of German students, it was finally closed in 1988.

The farmers' association already existed in 1899. There was also a reading club, a master club, a funeral club, the volunteer fire brigade, a church choir, a brass band and a choral society. From 1948 there was a cultural center in the village, in which films were also shown.

== Economy ==
The main occupation of the inhabitants in the 19th and 20th centuries was agriculture, with a focus on cereal farming. This was followed by the cultivation of fodder and industrial crops, as well as fruit farming and viticulture. Satchinez was also known for breeding horses and cattle. In terms of craftsmen, there were carpenters, joiners, barbers, rope makers, tailors, butchers, hatters, saddlers and painters. Then there were general merchants and innkeepers. At the turn of the 19th and 20th centuries, Satchinez had four horse mills, two oil presses, a water mill and a steam mill. At the same time there was also a credit union, as well as a post office.

== Points of interest ==
=== Manaszy Mansion ===
Manaszy Mansion is a curia (mansion) built by the Manaszy-Barco family in 1840 on the estate bought in 1813 from Georgius Manicaty Sofronius, prince of Tuscany. The Manaszy-Barco family was an important one in the Banat area, having many other properties, and its members were active in the Parliament of Budapest. The Manaszy-Barco family once estranged the estate, so the noble residence passed to several owners, starting in the second half of the 19th century. Among them are Archduke John of Tuscany in 1874, Francisca Todesco in 1877, Béla and Géza Eróss in 1879, then János and Mihály Kastory in 1888. The last of them is a well-known merchant from Timișoara, Toma Surlaș. With the establishment of the communist regime and the beginning of the collectivization program, in 1951 the lands became the property of the state, the mansion being used as a protocol headquarters for the members of Comtim, the largest pig breeding plant in Eastern Europe. Introduced on the list of historical monuments, Manaszy Mansion was returned in 2004 to the heirs of the Manaszy family. After the restoration of the building and the redevelopment of the park, the mansion is used for organizing private events, conferences, seminars or presentations of some companies.

The Manaszy ensemble is located near the Orthodox church, in the southeastern part of Hodoni. The estate includes, in addition to the neoclassical mansion, two outbuildings, a dendrological park – where there is an underground ice house, now abandoned and impracticable – an orchard, an apiary and a dried pond, which once communicated with the canal that borders the estate on its east side. The mansion, the central element, is representative for the small mansions from Banat, the neoclassical style being adopted and propagated in the era and region by the small and medium nobility.

=== Satchinez swamps ===
The Satchinez swamps form a 242-hectare (600-acre) ornithological reserve on the border of Satchinez. The Satchinez swamps, together with the lake complex, are considered a remnant of the former swamps of the Banat Plain, periodically flooded and occupying most of the plain until the 18th century. It was founded in 1942, at the suggestion of ornithologist Dionisie Linția.

Also called the "Banat Delta", the reserve concentrates 40% of Romania's aquatic flora and avifauna, being the second most important after the Danube Delta. The landscape of the reserve is characterized by the existence of permanent swamps that alternate with areas occupied by reeds, ponds, hayfields and willow clumps. The biological potential of this reserve is highlighted by the presence of over 100 species of protected birds in Europe, of which 42 are endemic. In addition, there are 93 species of aquatic and paludous plants, ten plant associations and 875 species of insects. Among the bird species protected in this reserve are: little egret, great egret, squacco heron, pygmy cormorant, black-winged stilt, night heron, great bittern, little bittern, little grebe, great crested grebe, mallard, moorhen, water rail, spotted crake, northern lapwing, white-winged tern, etc.

== Notable people ==
- Pál Kinizsi (1432–1494), general
- Vincențiu Babeș (1821–1907), lawyer, journalist and politician
- Emanuil Ungurianu (1845–1929), lawyer and philanthropist
- Frans Killinger (1875–1936), military officer and police inspector who planned to commit the first coup d'état in Suriname
- Vasile Gain (1912–1993), football player and manager
- Josef Jochum (1930–2017), actor, director and author
- Martin Roos (b. 1942), Roman Catholic cleric
