= Green Forest, Timișoara =

Romanian urban forest

Green Forest Romanian: Pădurea Verde
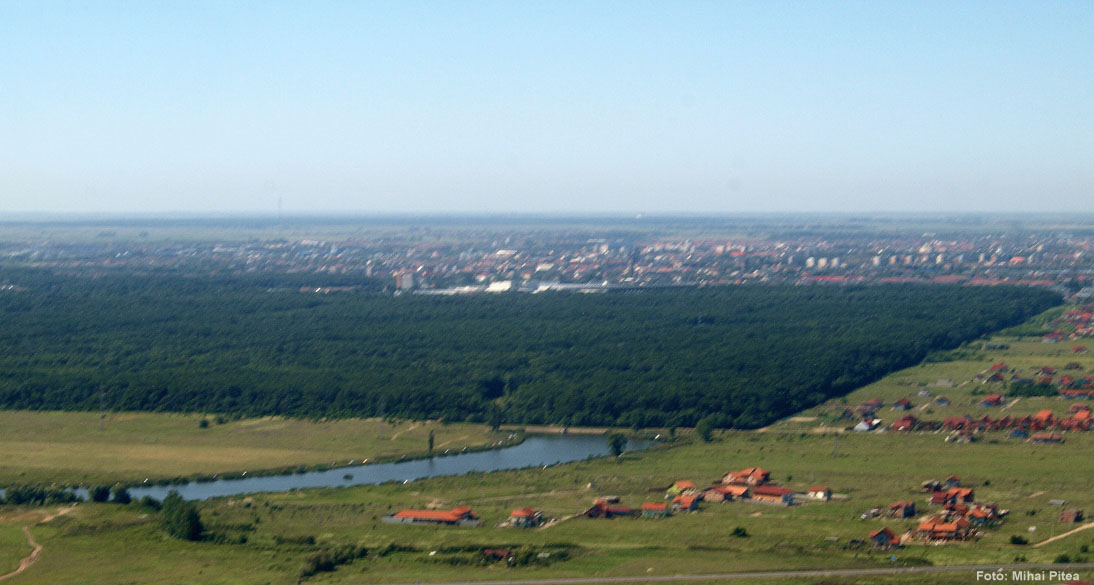

- Location within Romania

Geography
- Location: Timiș, Romania
- Coordinates: 45°47′17.85″N 21°15′53.87″E
- Area: 737 ha (1,820 acres)

Administration
- Established: 1860
- Authority: Timișoara City Hall

Ecology
- Dominant tree species: Quercus sp. (69%), Fraxinus excelsior (10%)

The Green Forest (in Romanian Pădurea Verde, in Hungarian Vadászerdő, in German Jagdwald, is an urban forest in Timișoara, Romania, located in the northeastern part of the city, in the UMT-Pădurea Verde district, near the Lipovei, Modern, Fabric and Ghiroda Nouă neighborhoods.

It is the largest urban park in Southeastern Europe, being crossed by the Behela River, which has the Unu stream as a right-bank tributary and flows into the Bega Canal. It has an area of 737 hectares.

It helps supply Timișoara with oxygen and is also an important recreation and leisure area. Pădurea Verde borders the Banat Village Museum and the Timișoara Zoological Garden.

== History ==
The area has been inhabited since ancient times, proof of this being a Sarmatian tomb of a woman discovered after archeological surveys in the forest in 1969. The cartographic data from 1723–1725 but also from 1776 show that in the 18th century there was a secular forest in this space.

Under the Habsburgs, the forest was declared a hunting area reserved exclusively for the first governor of Banat, Count Claude Florimond de Mercy (1732). He requested the restoration of a hunting pavilion erected in the forest during the Ottoman occupation. It was permanently guarded by six hussars and Mercy's more than 100 greyhounds. After 1753, when the civil administration was introduced in Banat, the forest became accessible to other senior officers.

In the interwar period, the forest was a Royal Crown domain and was intended for pheasant, stag and deer hunting. The city's forest nursery was established in 1929. From the planting material produced in the forest nursery (oak, maple, elm, walnut, sycamore, linden, etc.) the National Revival Forest (Romanian: Pădurea Renașterii Naționale) took shape in 1937–1938. In 1954, the state made 150 ha of the forest available to the city for the establishment of a nature reserve and a recreational area.

In 2020, the Romanian Government transferred 520 ha from Romsilva to the Timișoara City Hall for the arrangement of a forest park. Until 2020, the Timișoara City Hall managed 50 ha of the Green Forest.

== Geography ==
The Green Forest is located in the northeastern part of Timișoara and its surface, measuring about 737 ha, is divided into 78 plots more or less square-shaped. The forest is crossed on a length of 2.6 km by Behela (tributary of the Bega River), which feeds, before entering the forest, the Dumbrăvița lake, a place of leisure for tourists and fishermen. Two other smaller lakes are also located within the forest: the Șerpilor Lake and Balta Măcin, situated near the Banat Village Museum.

== Flora ==
The woody species that grow in the Green Forest are pedunculate oak (Quercus robur), hornbeam (Carpinus betulus), ash (Fraxinus excelsior), Tatar maple (Acer tataricum), field maple (Acer campestre), Turkey oak (Quercus cerris), linden (Tilia sp.) and black locust (Robinia pseudoacacia). The predominant species is Quercus sp. (69%), followed by Fraxinus excelsior (10%). 5% of the existing trees are aged between 101 and 120 years, 21% between 81 and 100 years, with 61- to 80-years-old trees predominating (41%). The shrub layer includes hawthorn (Crataegus monogyna), blackthorn (Prunus spinosa), cornel (Cornus mas) and privet (Ligustrum vulgare), while the herbaceous layer is composed of mosses, lichens and herbaceous plants. Among the flowers, worth mentioning is the narrow-leaved helleborine (Cephalanthera longifolia), a species of wild orchid rare in Romania's flora that blooms between April and June.
