= Topla wooden church =

Heritage site in Timiș County, Romania

Church of the Nativity of the Theotokos
- Biserica „Nașterea Maicii Domnului”
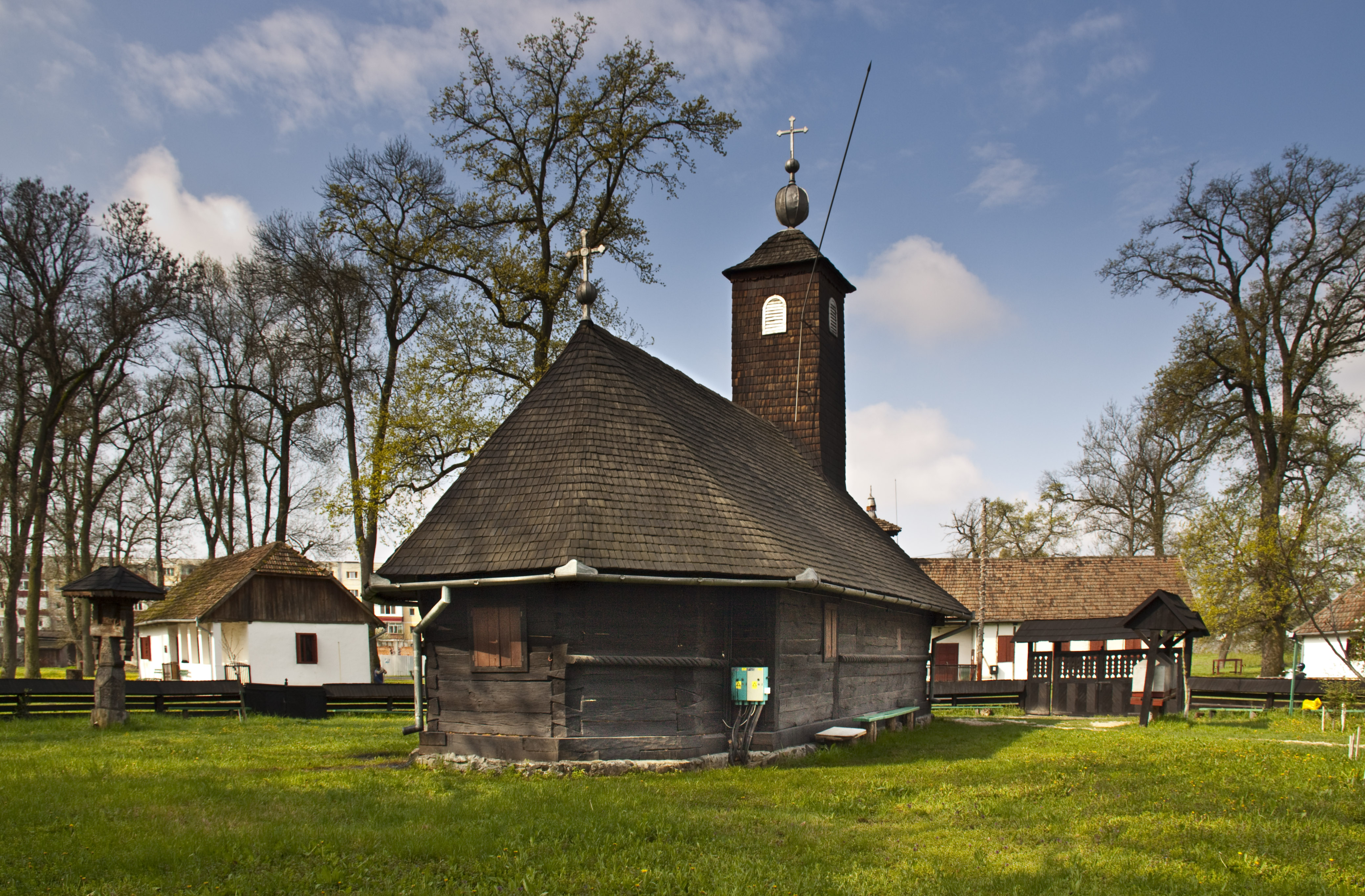
- Northeast side

Religion
- Affiliation: Romanian Orthodox
- Patron: Nativity of the Theotokos
- Year consecrated: 1997
- Status: Active

Location
- Location: Banat Village Museum, Timișoara, Romania
- Interactive map of Church of the Nativity of the Theotokos
- Coordinates: 45°46′41″N 21°15′55″E

Architecture
- Completed: 1746
- Materials: Sessile oak

Topla wooden church is currently located in the premises of the Banat Village Museum in Timișoara, Romania. It is registered in the list of historical monuments (2004) with the code TM-II-m-A-06093.

== History ==
It was built around 1746 in the village of Remetea-Luncă in Timiș County, bearing the patronage of Saints Archangels Michael and Gabriel. In 1806, another church was built in Remetea-Luncă, also made of wood, but more spacious. On this occasion, the old church was given to the village of Topla, located four kilometers to the north. The move was made in later years, using oak rollers pulled by 24 pairs of oxen. The donation is recorded on a gospel kept in the church.

Due to the depopulation of the village of Topla and the danger of degradation, in the 1980s the first steps to relocate the church began. In 1987 the church was demolished, and in 1992 it was transferred to the Banat Village Museum in Timișoara. Between 1994 and 1996 mounting and restoration work was carried out. But, in 1998, a strong storm brought down the trunk of a tree on top of it, thus needing restoration and consolidation both inside and outside. Then a supporting vault was made along the entire length of the altar and the nave.

The consecration of the church dedicated to the Nativity of the Mother of God took place on 13 April 1997. After this date, the church returned to the purpose for which it was built, becoming an Orthodox parish for the residents of the Green Forest area. Today, the parish has almost 200 families and 500 believers.

The church burned almost completely on the night of 25–26 March 2025. At that time, the church vault was being dismantled for restoration.

== Architecture ==
Topla wooden church is one of the most representative old churches in Banat built in the style of traditional architecture, which is still in operation, along with the other wooden churches in the Făget area, from Zolt, Povârgina, Bătești, Curtea and Românești. It is built of oak beams carved into four sides and placed one on top of the other, having as a base oak soles placed on a stone foundation. The roof is made of shingles, as is the covering of the tower. The wooden belfry, fitted with a 150-kilogram bell, is separate, being placed to the right of the church.

Typologically, it belongs to the series of churches with the apse of the altar uncrossed, keeping the original doors and windows. The western portal is a special artistic achievement, made of parquet boards, arranged in concentric rhombuses and decorated with metal marks. The entire portal appears surrounded by a splendid motif of the torsade, which then continues on the entire outer perimeter of the church in the form of a median belt. The interior painting, still in good condition today, was done in 1807. The iconostasis is made of solid wood with openings carved in the shape of a brace, reminiscent of a decorative motif practiced in Brâncovenesc art. Its painting was probably executed in 1854.

In the church yard, a cemetery has been reconstructed where several wooden, metal and stone crosses are placed, next to a trifle carved by the folk craftsman Alexandru Perța-Cuza.

== Gallery ==
Outside

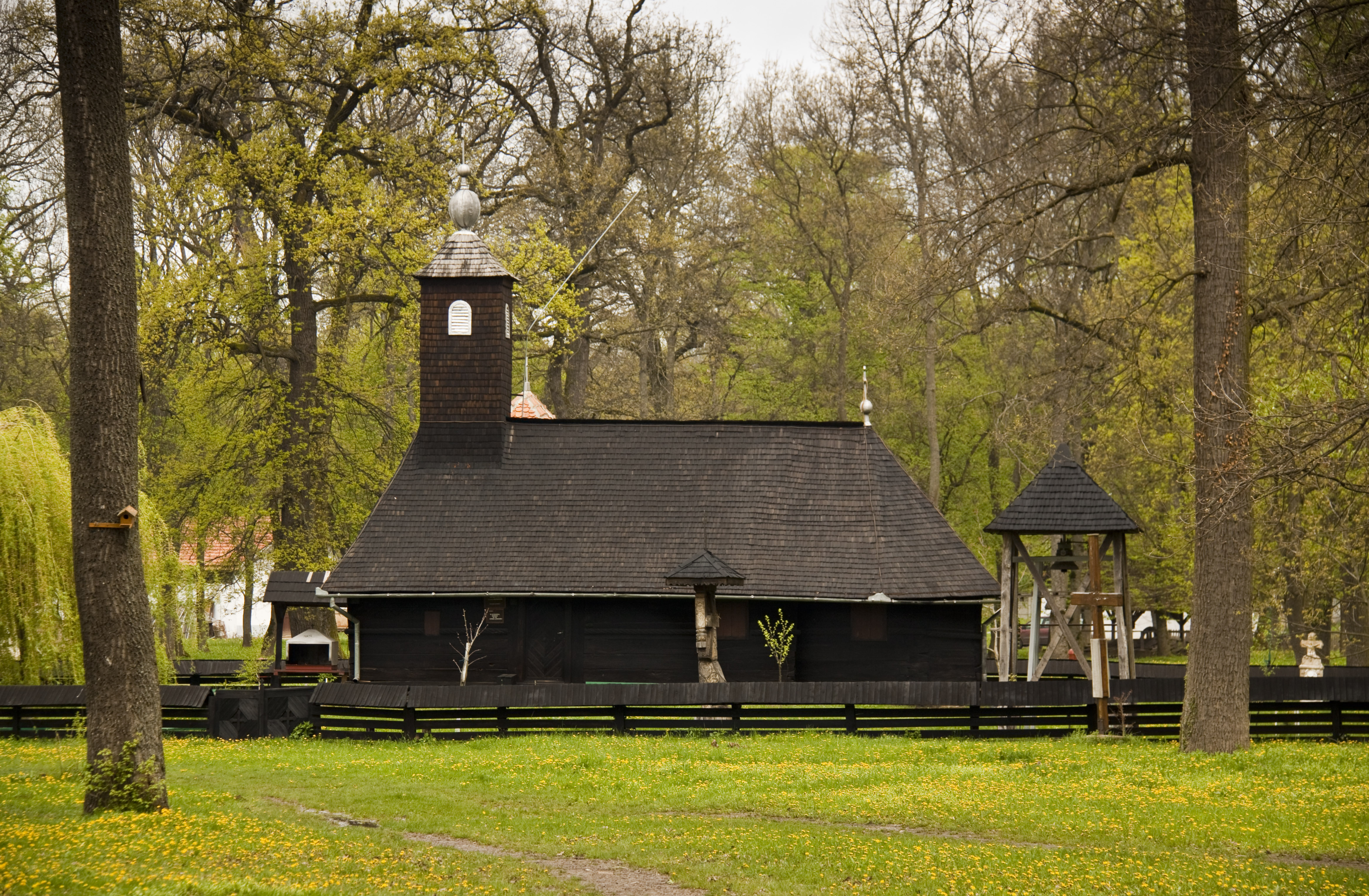
From south

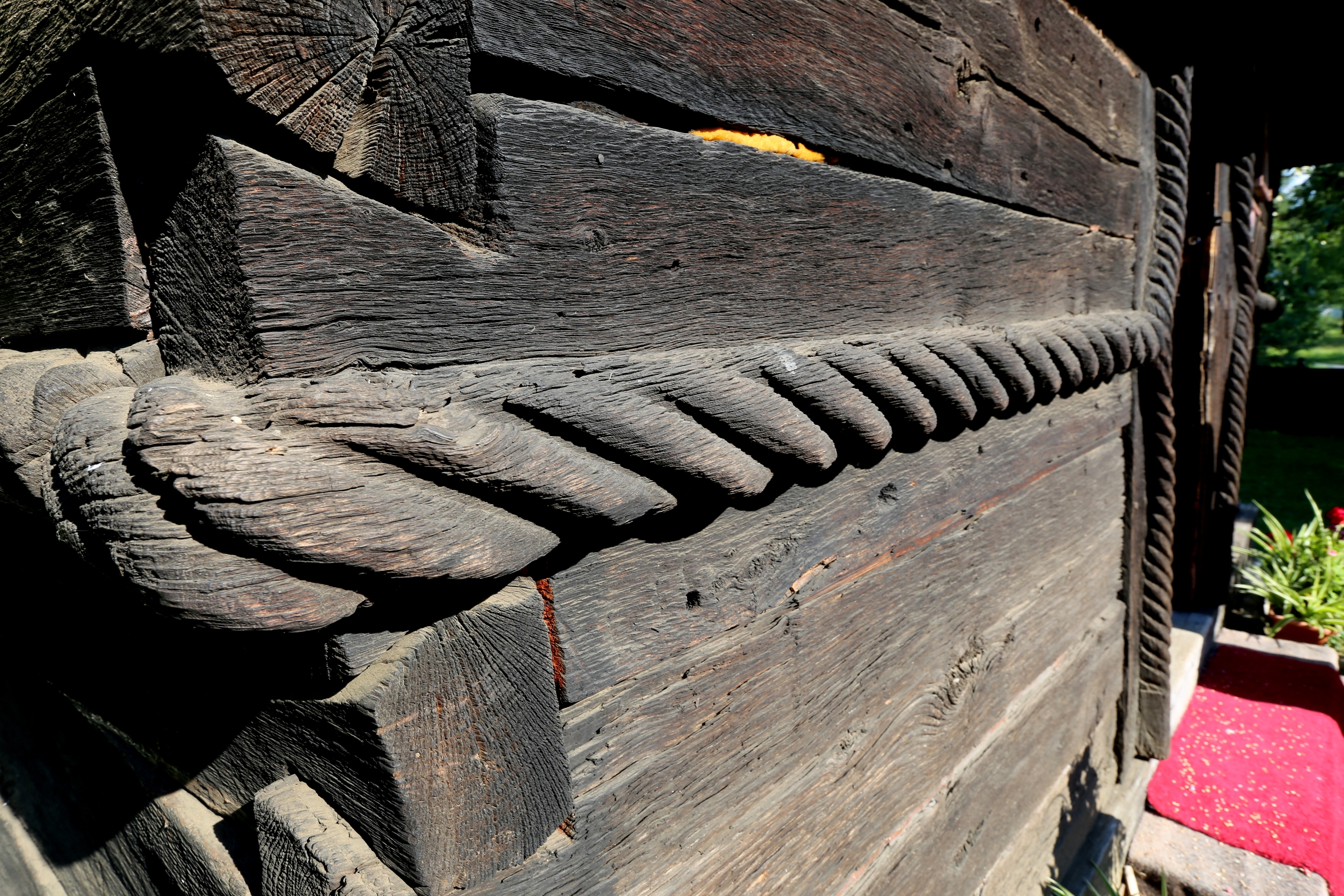
The median belt

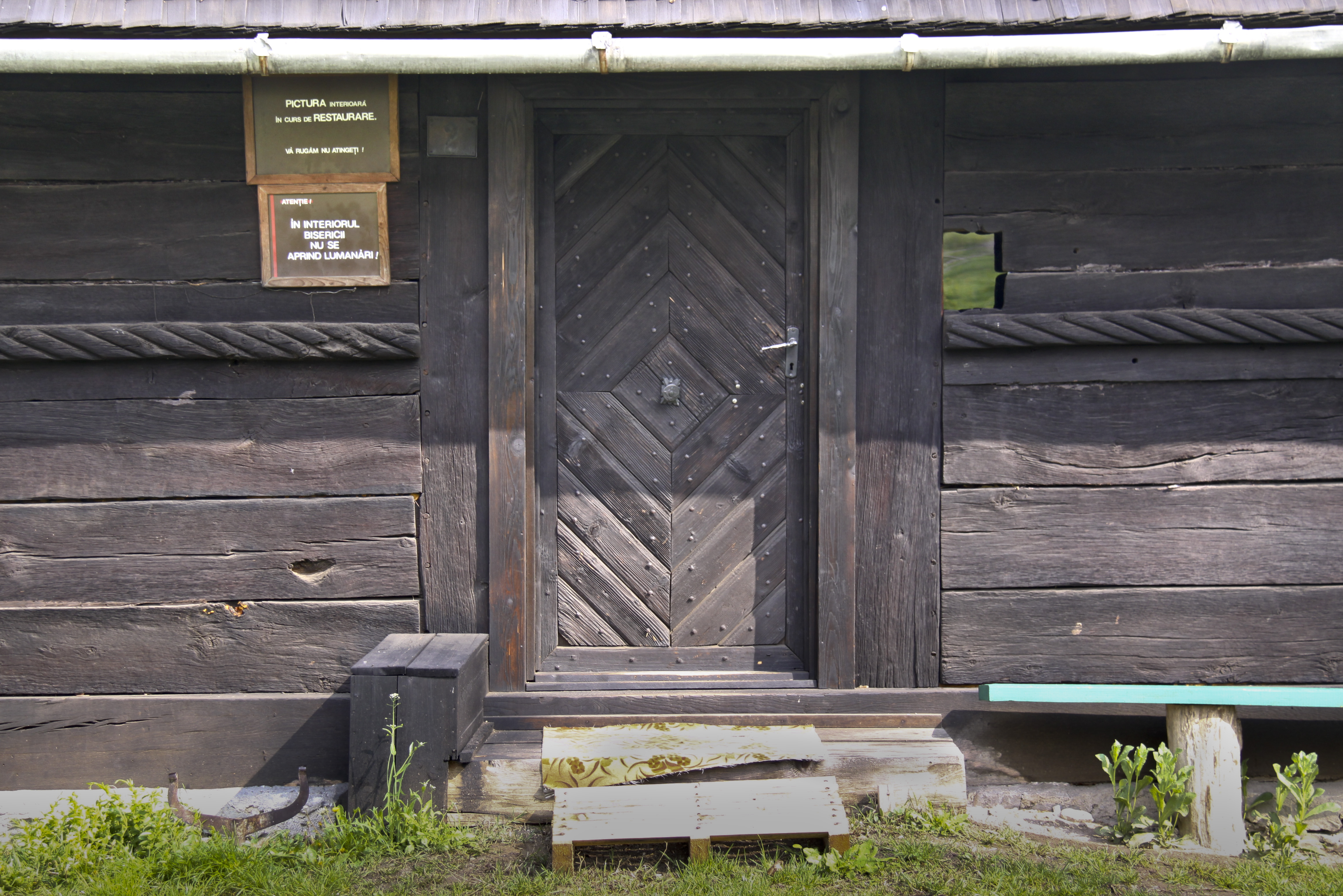
Door to nave

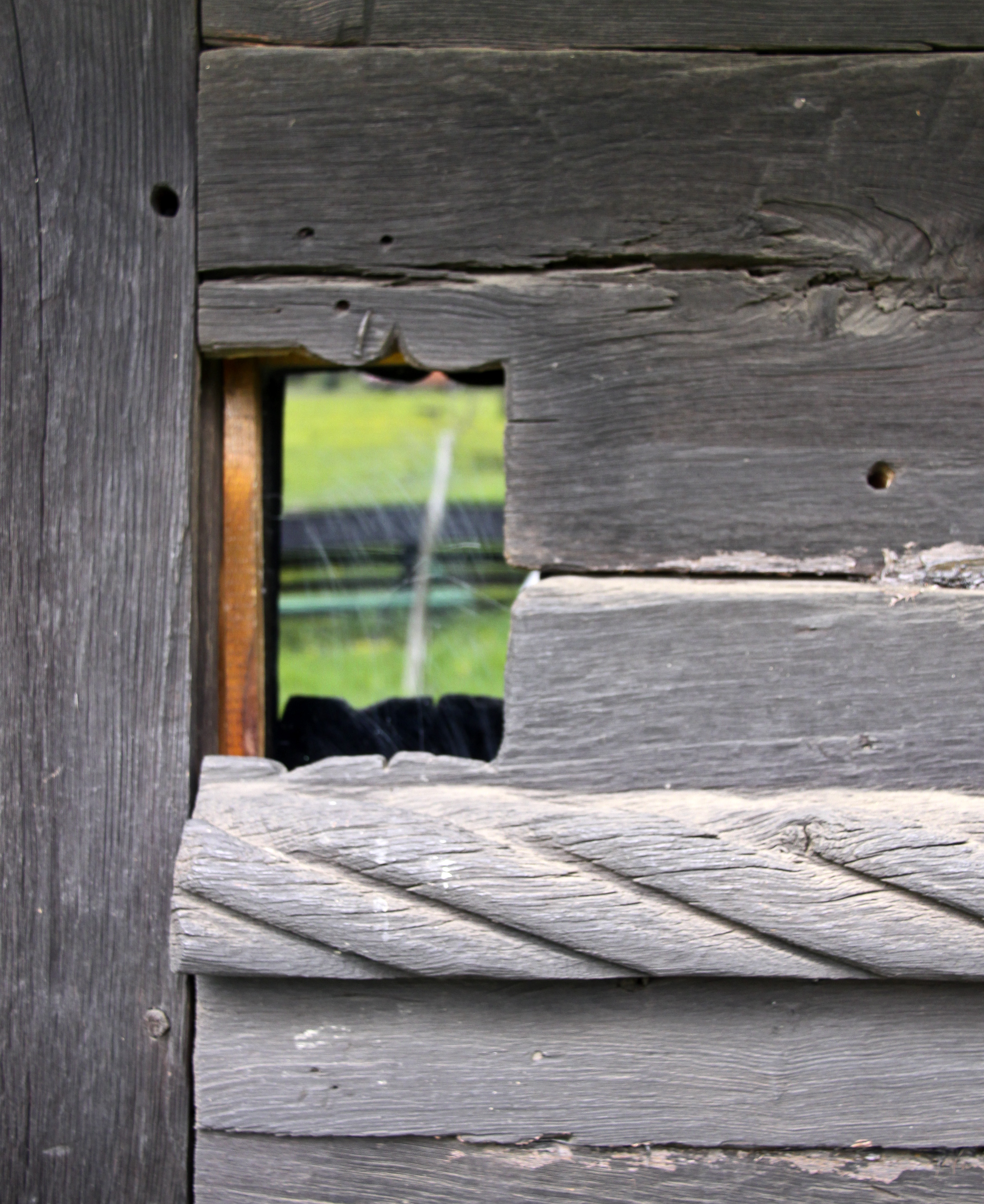
Original nave window

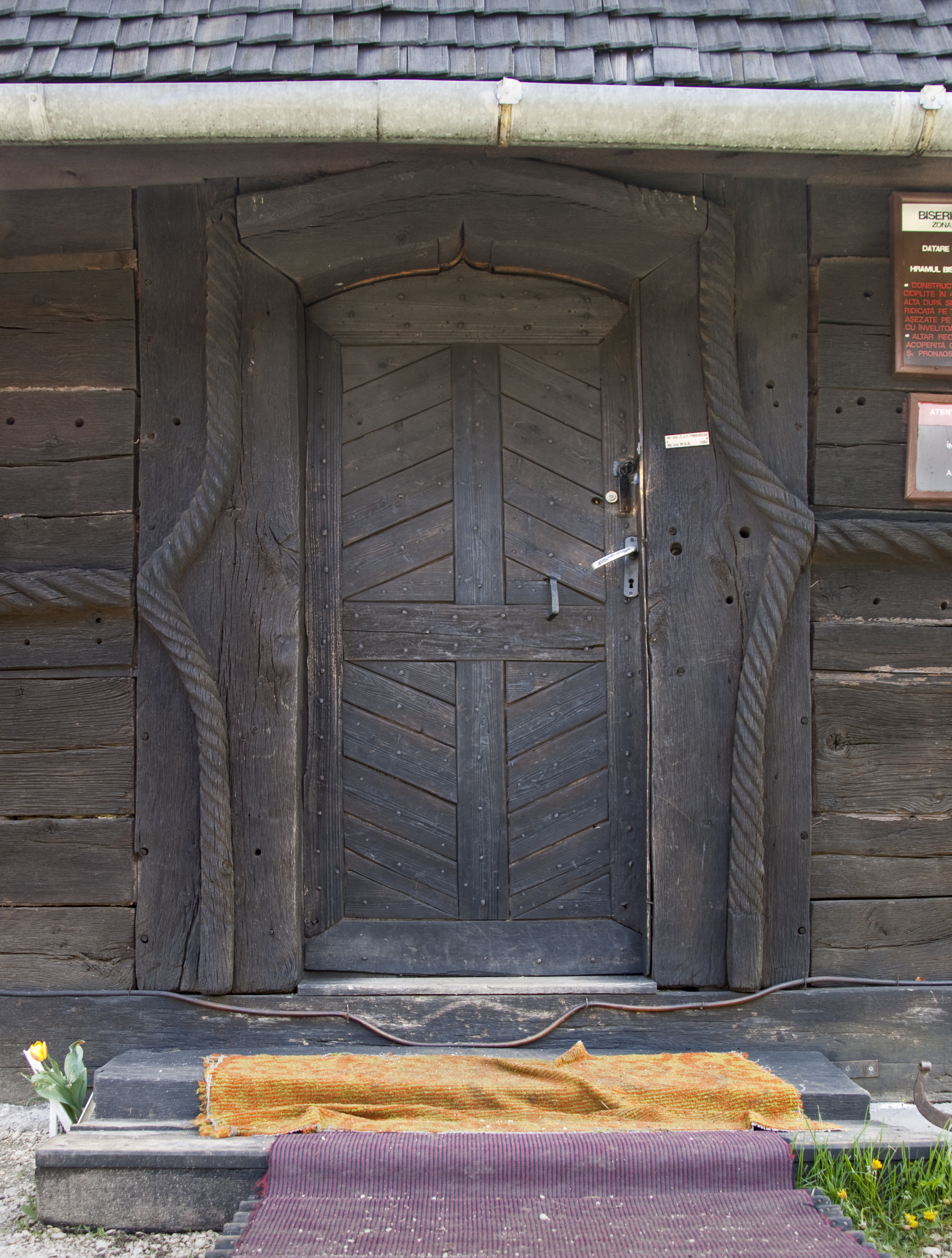
The entrance portal

Inside

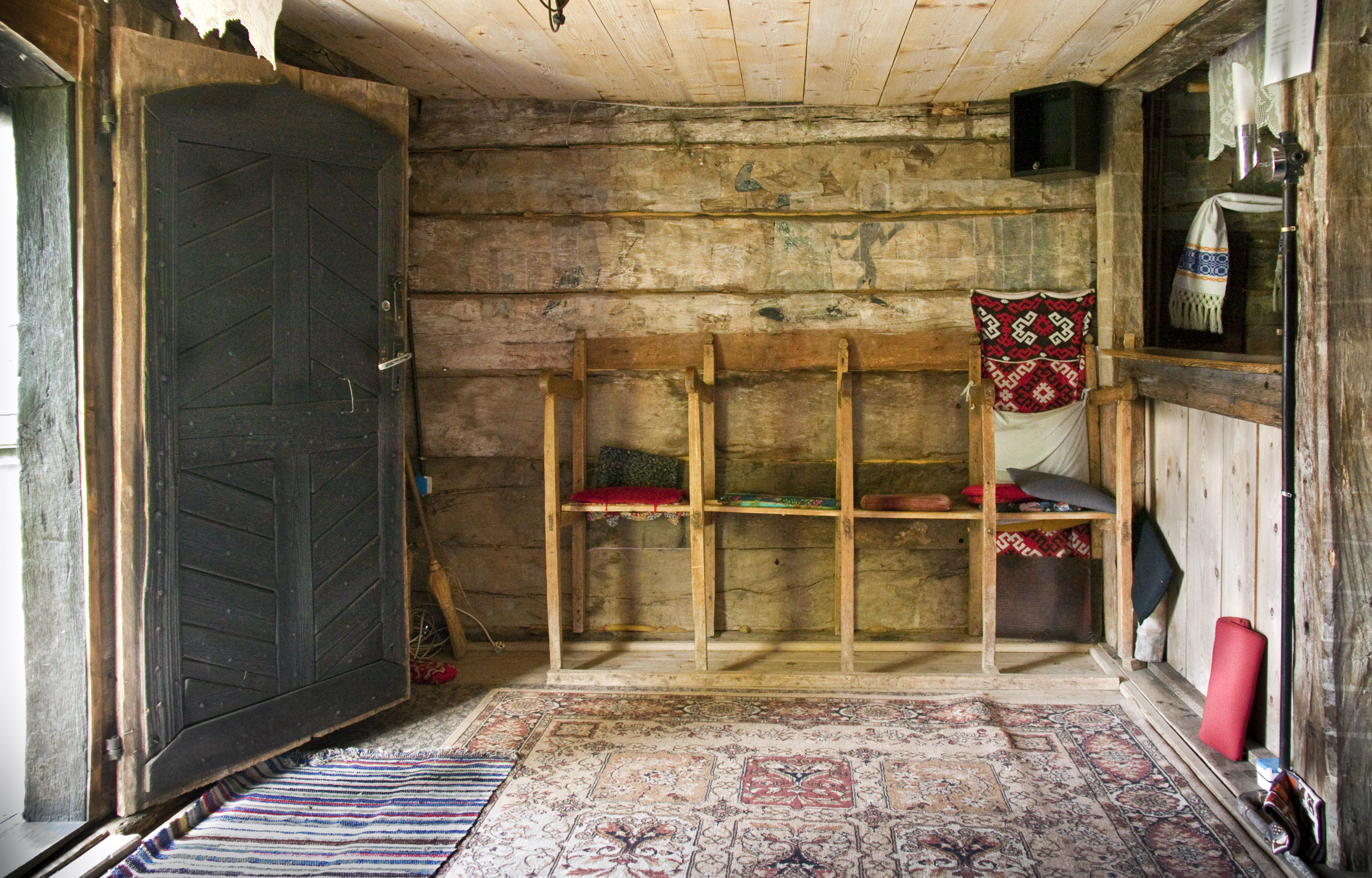
The narthex

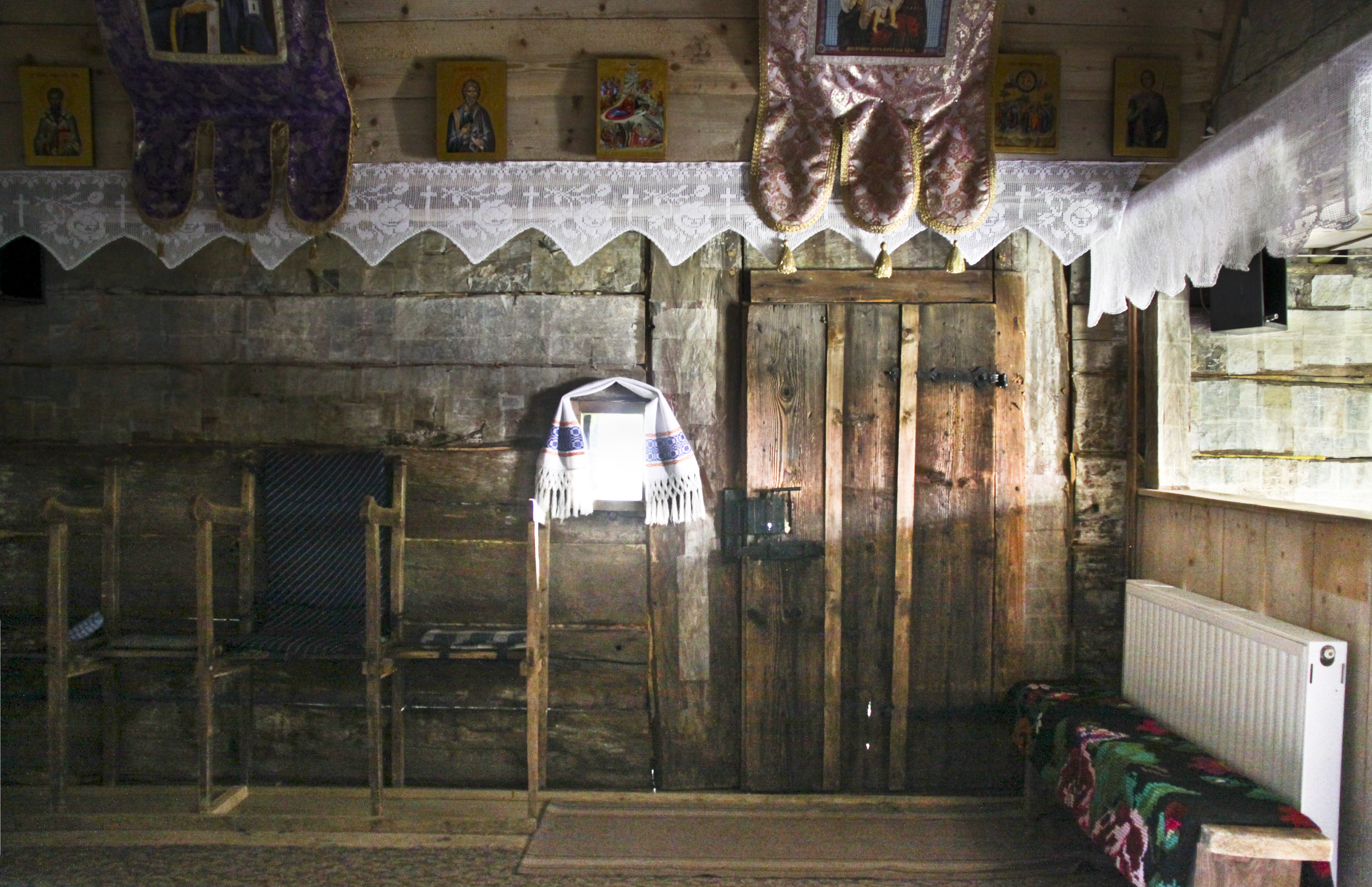
The nave

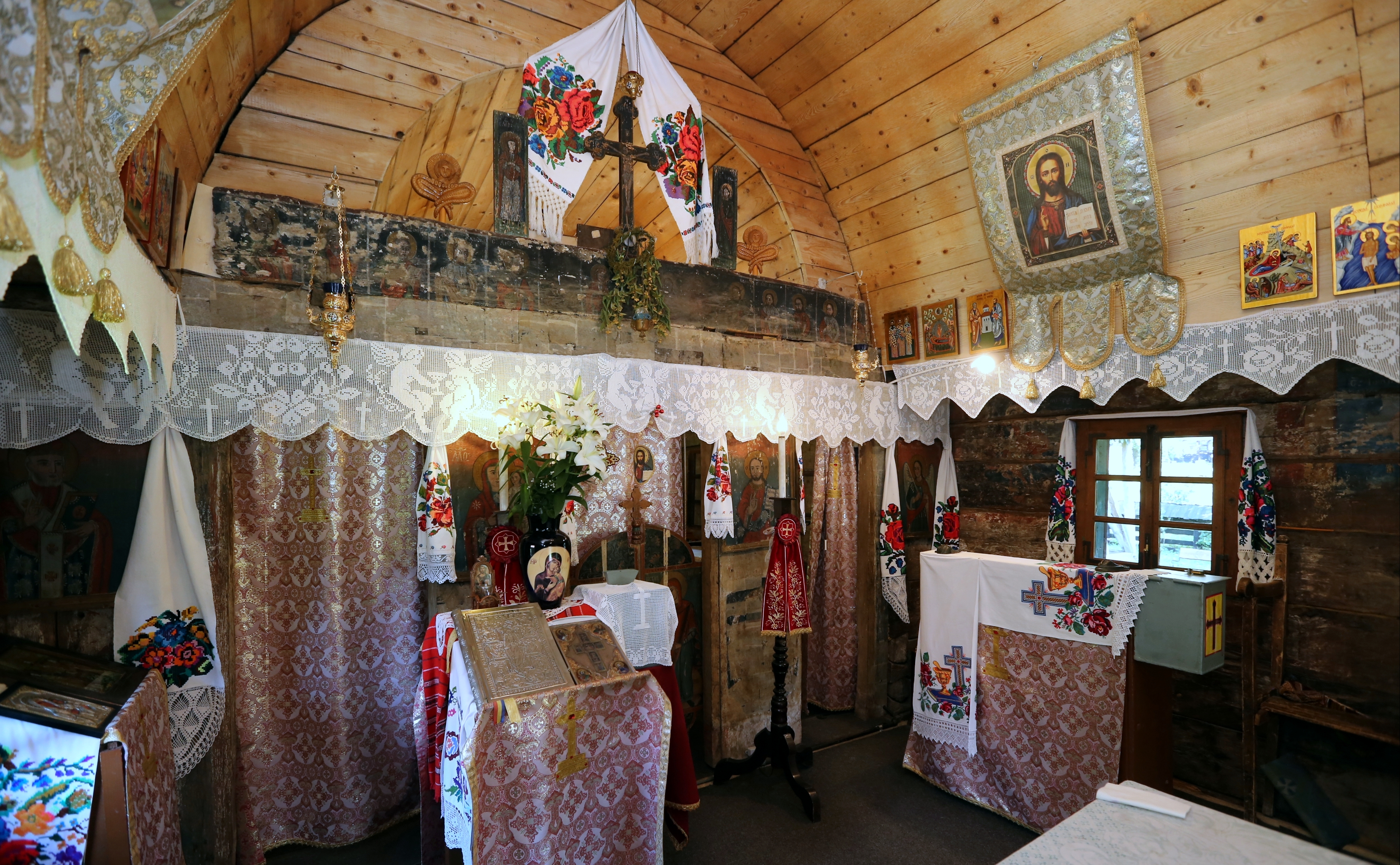
The altar

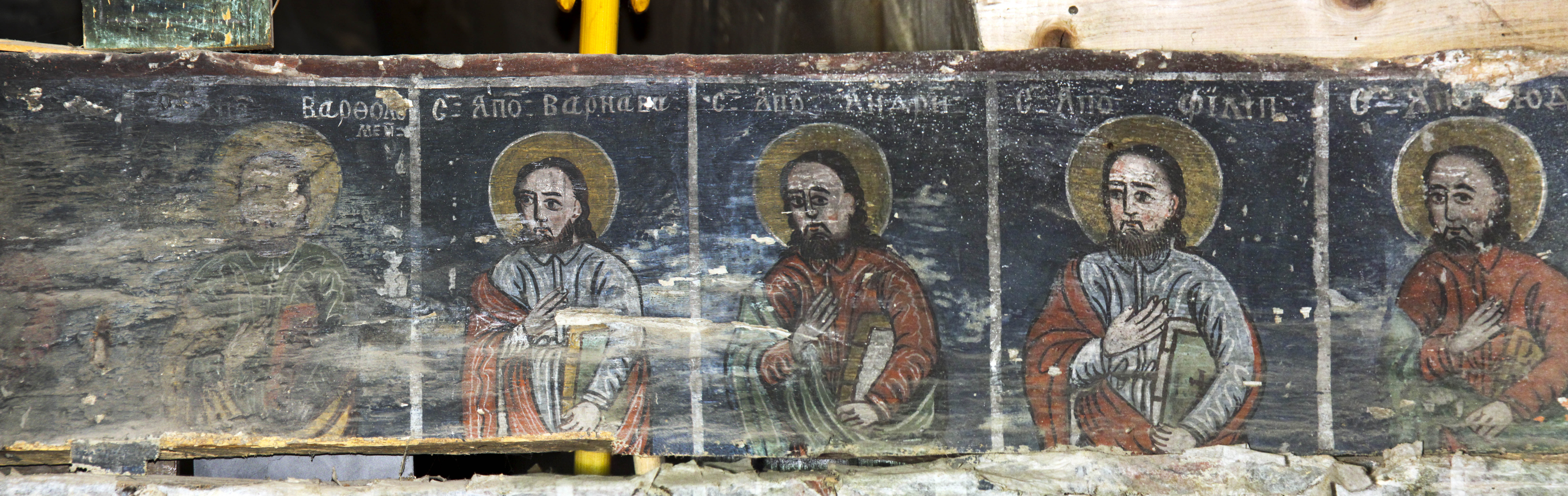
Apostles on the iconostasis
