= Jahrmarkt =

Jahrmarkt ("annual market") is the German name of the following populated places:

- Balassagyarmat, Hungary
- Giarmata, Romania
