= UMT–Pădurea Verde =

Coordinates: 45.7711929°N 21.2562307°E

UMT–Pădurea Verde is a district of Timișoara located near the Green Forest and the former Timișoara Mechanical Plants (Romanian: Uzinele Mecanice Timișoara, abbreviated UMT). Founded in 1960 by the merger of two factories in the city, the Timișoara Mechanical Plants were bought in 2018 by Continental AG, a German multinational automotive manufacturer which has been operating since the early 2000s near the former industrial platform. The Banat Village Museum and the Zoological Garden are located in this district.
