= Dumbrăvița, Timiș =

Dumbrăvița
- Commune
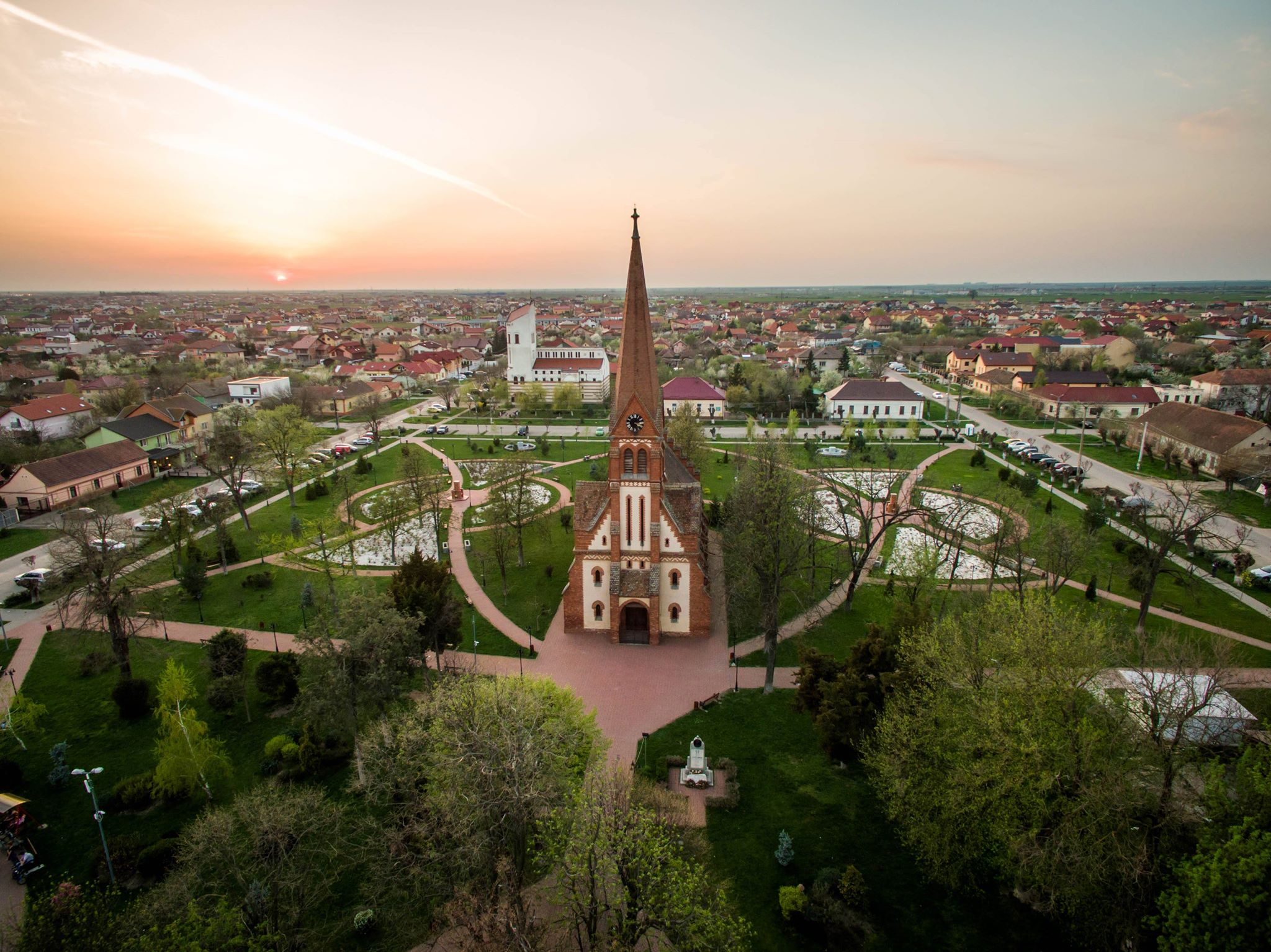
- Aerial view of the central park with the Reformed church

- Location in Timiș County

- Location in Romania
- Coordinates: 45°48′N 21°15′E
- Country: Romania
- County: Timiș
- Established: 1891

Government
  - Mayor (2020–): Horia-Grigore Bugarin (USR)
- Area: 18.98 km^{2} (7.33 sq mi)
- Population (2021-12-01): 20,014
  - Density: 1,054/km^{2} (2,731/sq mi)
- Time zone: UTC+02:00 (EET)
  - Summer (DST): UTC+03:00 (EEST)
- Postal code: 307160
- Vehicle reg.: TM
- Website: primaria-dumbravita.ro

Dumbrăvița (Hungarian: Újszentes, until 1906 Vadászerdő; German: Neusentesch; formerly Uisenteș and Sintești) is a commune in Timiș County, Romania. It is composed of a single village, Dumbrăvița. One of the most developed and rich communes in Romania, Dumbrăvița has become in recent years a suburb of Timișoara.

== Geography ==
Dumbrăvița is located in the Timiș Plain, in the center of Timiș County, in the peri-urban area of Timișoara, to which it is attached. It borders Covaci, Cerneteaz and Giarmata to the north, Giarmata-Vii to the east and Timișoara to the south. Dumbrăvița is crossed by Behela and Niarad, two streams flowing about a kilometer away from the village. Their stream beds are poorly developed, and the streamflows are low.

=== Climate ===
Climate chart (precipitation, max. and min. temperature)
J	F	M	A	M	J	J	A	S	O	N	D
45 4 −3	45 7 −2	51 12 2	66 18 7	73 23 12	84 26 16	71 28 18	62 28 18	61 23 13	51 17 8	52 12 4	56 5 −1
- █ Average max. and min. temperatures in °C
- █ Precipitation totals in mm
- Source: Climate-Data.org
Imperial conversion
J	F	M	A	M	J	J	A	S	O	N	D
1.8 39 27	1.8 44 29	2 54 36	2.6 64 45	2.9 73 53	3.3 79 60	2.8 83 64	2.4 83 64	2.4 73 56	2 63 47	2 53 39	2.2 41 30
- █ Average max. and min. temperatures in °F
- █ Precipitation totals in inches

The area is characterized by a moderate continental climate with Mediterranean influences. The average annual temperature in Dumbrăvița is 12.4 °C (54.3 °F). The temperatures are highest on average in August, at around 23.4 °C (74.1 °F). The lowest average temperatures in the year occur in January, when it is around 0.6 °C (33.1 °F). The annual rainfall is 717 mm (28.2 in). The period spanning from March to September has low atmospheric humidity, with values varying between 61% (July) and 69% (March). Sunny days represent about 75% of the total days. North winds have a higher frequency, followed by northeast winds. Mild winters and hot summers benefit the area, providing good conditions for early agricultural work.

=== Flora and fauna ===
Spontaneous fauna is represented by hares, wild boars, foxes, voles, hamsters and birds such as quails and pheasants.

The vegetation is steppe-specific. Among the grasses can be found the blue eryngo and the feather grass, and among the shrubs the dog rose and the blackthorn.

== History ==
Dumbrăvița was founded in 1891 by the colonization of 133 Hungarian families from Szentes, a town 50 km (31 mi) from Szeged. The colonization was officially organized and supported by the Hungarian government. It ordered the partial deforestation of the Green Forest that surrounds Timișoara, in order to accommodate the new settlement. However, the territory occupied today by Dumbrăvița has been inhabited since the Daco-Roman era, here being discovered five houses and three household pits dating from the 2nd–3rd centuries AD. The settlement seems to have been abandoned at the end of the 15th century, most likely due to the numerous attacks of the Turks. The new settlement founded in 1891 was called Vadászerdő; it is the translation from German into Hungarian of the compound word Jagdwald, which meant "hunting forest", the current Green Forest, used by Count Claude Florimond de Mercy, Austrian governor of Banat, after the conquest of the province by the Habsburgs. In 1892 the village already had several streets. At the request of its inhabitants, the village was renamed Újszentes ("New Szentes").

The construction of the Reformed church began in 1897, being funded by the Hungarian state; its consecration took place in 1901. Until then, locals belonged to the Reformed church in Timișoara. Very few at the beginning, Romanians started to settle in Dumbrăvița in greater numbers after the union of Banat with Romania. Thus, in 1921–1922, several families from Rusko Selo and Torak, from Serbian Banat and a few others from Comloșu Mare settled in Dumbrăvița. In 1927, another 42 Romanian families were put in possession of land. In the same year the Orthodox parish was established. In 1964, the name of the village was changed from Újszentes to the current name Dumbrăvița (literally "grove"). After the demolition of the church in Stanciova, in 1976, authorities approved the construction of a Roman Catholic church here. The first Eastern Orthodox church in Dumbrăvița was built only in 2005.

== Demographics ==
Ethnic composition (2021)
1. Romanians (70.0%)
2. Hungarians (4.55%)
3. Unknown (22.8%)
4. Others (2.58%)
Religious composition (2021)
1. Orthodox (57.5%)
2. Roman Catholics (6.09%)
3. Reformed (2.14%)
4. Pentecostals (1.67%)
5. Baptists (1.62%)
6. Unknown (25.6%)
7. Others (2.58%)
8. Irreligious, atheists and agnostics (2.83%)

Dumbrăvița had a population of 20,014 inhabitants at the 2021 census, up 166.02% from the 2011 census. Most inhabitants are Romanians (70.03%), with a minority of Hungarians (4.55%). For 22.84% of the population, ethnicity is unknown. By religion, most inhabitants are Orthodox (57.52%), but there are also minorities of Roman Catholics (6.09%), Reformed (2.14%), Pentecostals (1.67%) and Baptists (1.62%). For 25.55% of the population, religious affiliation is unknown.

Census		Ethnic composition
Year	Population	Romanians	Hungarians	Germans
1900	1,151	46	1,042	58
1910	1,243	47	1,144	40
1920	1,226	97	1,018	109
1930	1,490	381	995	109
1941	1,419	339	955	118
1956	1,439	325	1,054	51
1966	2,140	655	1,384	68
1977	2,978	1,157	1,687	100
1992	2,400	1,049	1,285	32
2002	2,693	1,576	1,054	32
2011	7,522	5,722	1,057	87
2021	20,014	14,016	912	129

== Politics and administration ==
The commune of Dumbrăvița is administered by a mayor and a local council composed of 19 councilors. The mayor, Horia-Grigore Bugarin, from the Save Romania Union, has been in office since 2020. As from the 2024 local elections, the local council has the following composition by political parties:

Party	Seats	Composition
Save Romania Union–People's Movement Party–Force of the Right	7	
Social Democratic Party	5	
National Liberal Party	3	
Renewing Romania's European Project	2	
Democratic Alliance of Hungarians in Romania	1	
Alliance for the Union of Romanians	1	

== Economy ==
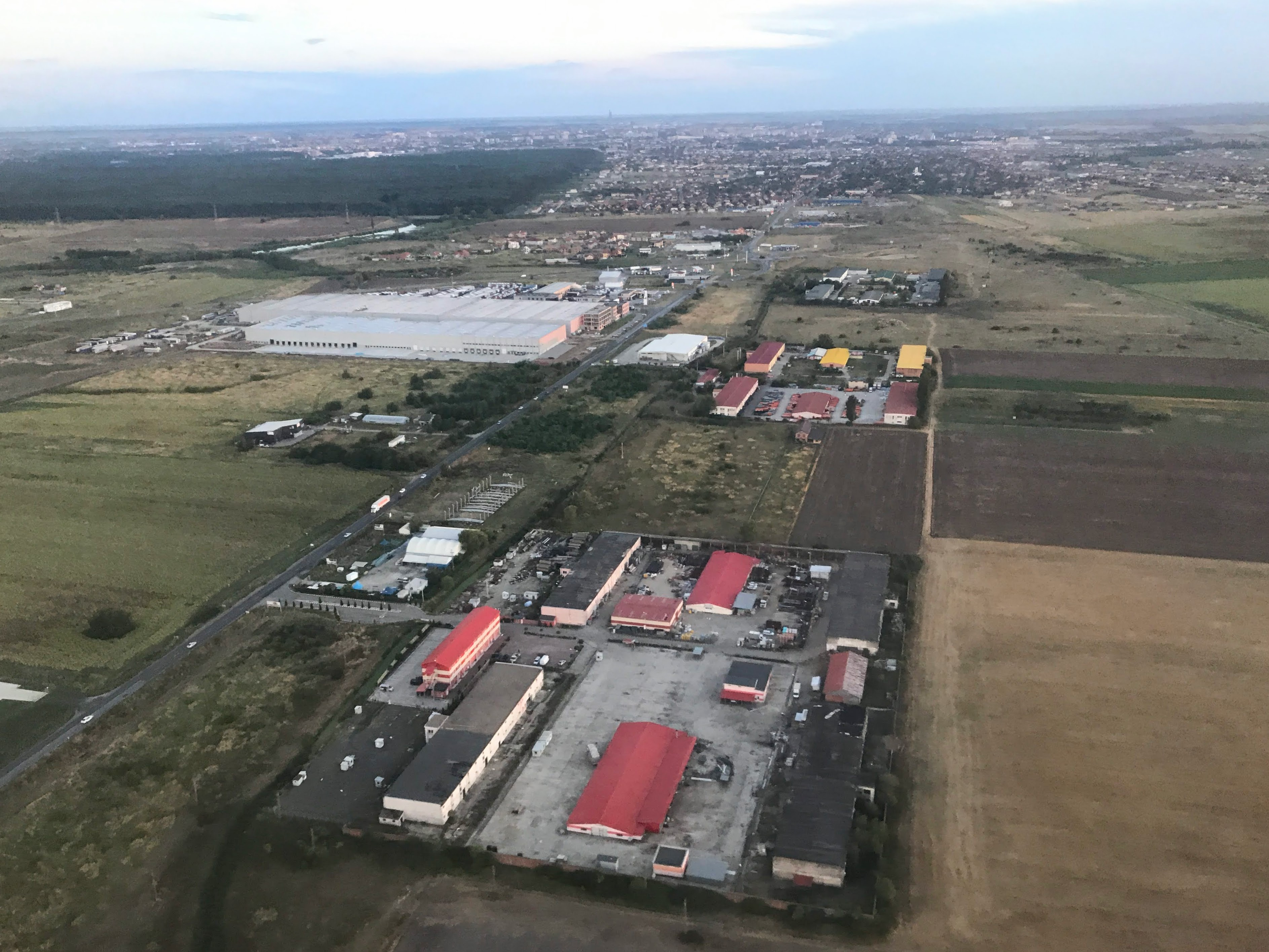
New industrial developments on the outskirts of Dumbrăvița

According to a study by the Regionalization Advisory Council in 2013, Dumbrăvița is the most developed locality in Romania. In recent years, Dumbrăvița has experienced a strong development, given its proximity to Timișoara, Dumbrăvița tending to become a suburb of the city. This development was mainly due to projects on European funds; between 2007 and 2013 alone, Dumbrăvița attracted over 3 million euros. Dumbrăvița's economy is dominated by the rising service sector, to which is added a well-developed industrial sector. The agricultural activities have an insignificant weight in the commune's economy, being reduced to the practice of subsistence farming. Trade is the subsector that has known the widest entrepreneurial dynamics, so that, currently, over 35% of the companies in Dumbrăvița are active in this field.

In terms of real estate, Dumbrăvița is one of the most expensive periurban areas of the major cities in Romania, even more expensive than Timișoara.

== Twin towns ==
Dumbrăvița is twinned with the following towns:

- (Hungary) Sándorfalva
- (Hungary) Szentes
- (Serbia) Žitište

== Gallery ==
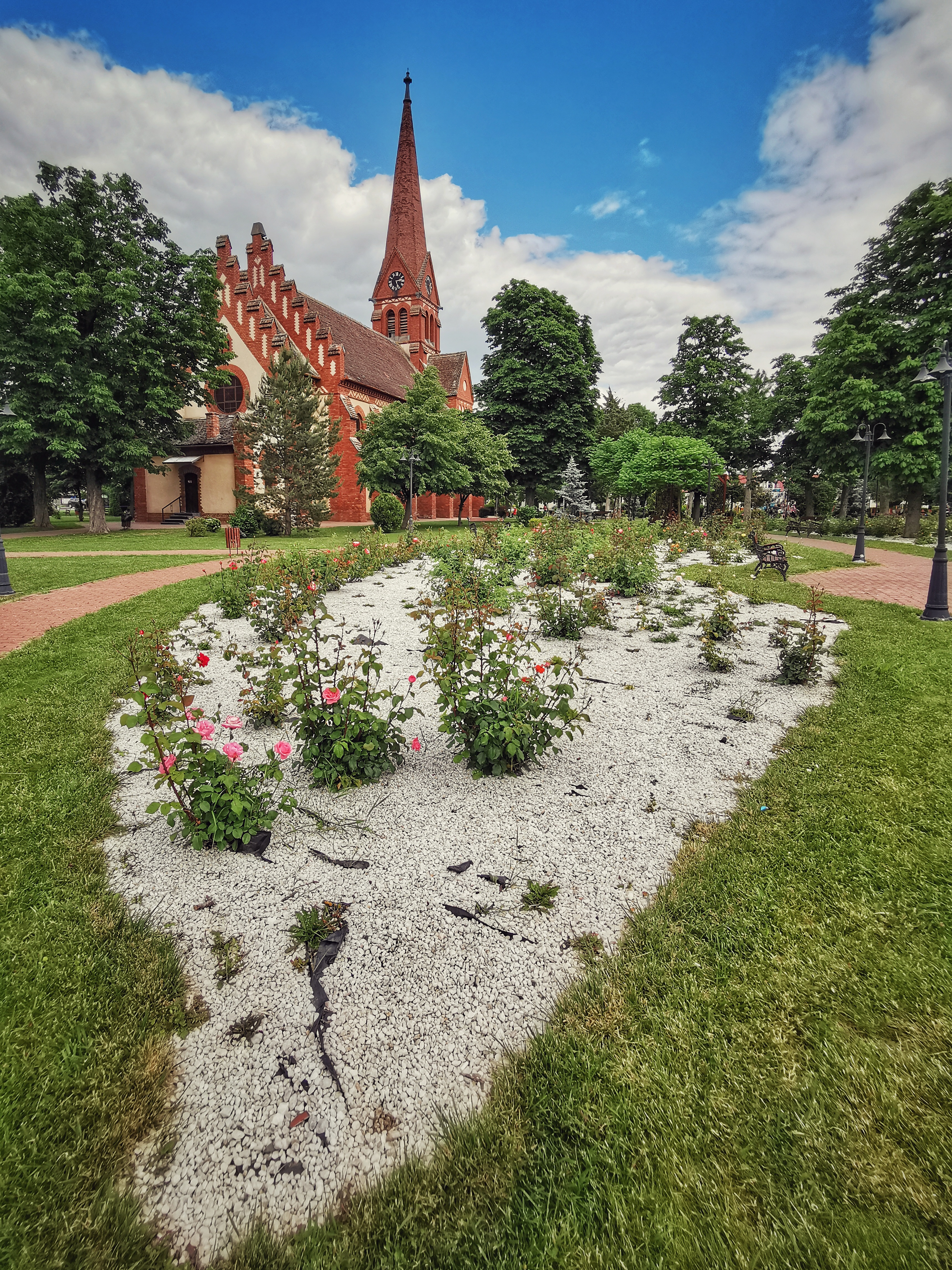
Reformed church (1897)

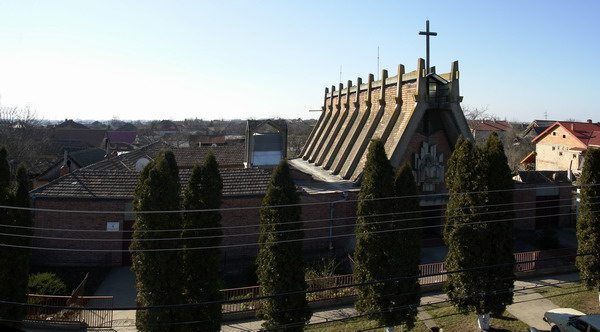
Roman Catholic church (1979)

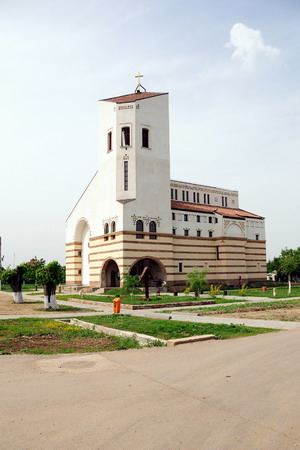
St. Basil Orthodox church (2005)
