= Giarmata =

- Commune
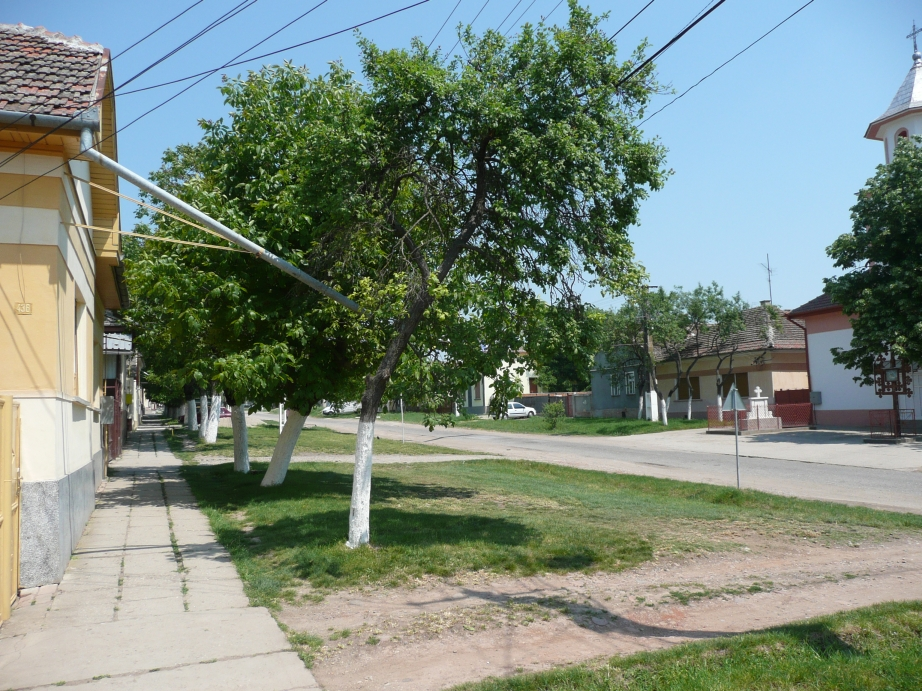
- A street in Giarmata

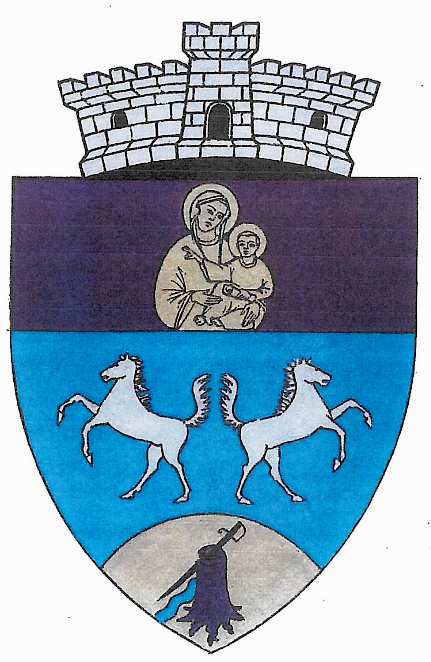
- Coat of arms

- Location in Timiș County

- Location in Romania
- Coordinates: 45°50′N 21°19′E
- Country: Romania
- County: Timiș

Government
  - Mayor (2020–): Claudiu Mihălceanu (PNL)
- Area: 72.99 km^{2} (28.18 sq mi)
- Population (2021-12-01): 6,831
  - Density: 93.59/km^{2} (242.4/sq mi)
- Time zone: UTC+02:00 (EET)
  - Summer (DST): UTC+03:00 (EEST)
- Postal code: 307210–307211
- Vehicle reg.: TM
- Website: primariagiarmata.ro

Giarmata (Romanian pronunciation: [ˈdʒjarmata]; until 1925 Iermata Timișană; Hungarian: Temesgyarmat; German: Jahrmarkt; Serbian: Ђармата, romanized: Đarmata) is a commune in Timiș County, Romania. It is composed of two villages, Cerneteaz and Giarmata (commune seat).

== Geography ==
Giarmata commune is situated in the central part of Timiș County, on the edge of the Vinga Plain—an area that transitions between the Lipova Hills and a low-lying plain—approximately 12 km northeast of Timișoara. It shares borders with Pișchia commune to the north, Remetea Mare commune to the east, the administrative territories of Ghiroda and Dumbrăvița communes to the southeast, and Sânandrei commune to the west.

=== Relief ===
The territory of Giarmata commune lies within Romania's Western Plain, which represents the easternmost section of the Tisa Plain and forms part of the larger Pannonian Depression. As such, the entire commune is situated in a predominantly flat landscape, occasionally marked by shallow depressions, sand dunes, or fluvial sandbanks.

The Timiș Plain is largely a recent floodplain, shaped by the Bega, Timiș, and their various tributaries and branches. Until the early 19th century, the frequent shifting of these waterways gave the area a marshy character. It was only after extensive hydro-reclamation works that the plain took on its current form. Today, the alluvial plain of the Timiș can be divided into three sectors based on its recent evolution and the effects of land improvement: the reclaimed Beghei Plain, the reclaimed Bârzava Plain, and the Timiș Island Plain.

Giarmata commune lies primarily within the Timiș Island Plain, with a portion extending into the reclaimed Beghei Plain. This area is characterized as an alluvial plain formed by fluvio-lacustrine subsidence, where riverbeds—elevated by heavy deposits of alluvium—are suspended above the surrounding land. Between these elevated beds lie low-lying, marshy areas where the groundwater is close to the surface. The terrain has an altitude ranging from 84 to 90 meters, with a very gentle slope—generally less than 17°—which historically contributed to the meandering paths of rivers (now straightened and dammed). The microrelief features predominantly negative landforms, such as elongated microdepressions, both open and closed.

=== Hydrography ===
The total length of cadastral watercourses within the territory of Giarmata commune is 14.84 km. The surface water bodies (rivers) in the area include:

- Bega Veche River (also known as Beregsău or Niraj) – confluences with the Măgheruș River (Fibiș, Niarad);
- Behela River (Luchin) – confluences with the Unu River (Reisenberg);
- Remetea River – confluences with the Behela River;
- Behela River (Luchin) – confluences with the Bega Veche River;
- Măgheruș River (Fibiș, Niarad) – confluences with the Bega Veche River (Beregsău, Niraj);
- Unu River (Reisenberg) – confluences with the Behela River (Luchin).

In addition, the total perimeter of cadastral lakes in Giarmata commune is 1.291 km, represented by the Giarmata Reservoir, which is situated within the Behela River basin.

=== Vegetation ===
Phytogeographically, Giarmata is part of the Central European geobotanical province, with significant influence from the nearby South European geobotanical province. The region's typical vegetation is forest-steppe. However, natural vegetation has largely been altered by human activity and replaced predominantly with cultivated plants, especially cereals.

The dominant tree species include Quercus robur, Ulmus glabra, Fraxinus excelsior, Acer campestre, Pyrus pyraster, and Malus sylvestris. The forest understory is primarily composed of Crataegus monogyna, Cornus sanguinea, Corylus avellana, Cornus mas, Rhamnus frangula, Prunus spinosa, Euonymus verrucosus, and Ligustrum vulgare. Additionally, climbing plants such as Hedera helix and Clematis vitalba are commonly found.

Along the Behela Stream, the coppices form a continuous chain, enhancing the banks and wet meadows with their vibrant and visually appealing greenery. The dominant species in this riparian zone are willows, particularly Salix alba and Salix × fragilis (commonly known as white and crack willows). The latter is characterized by young, fragile shoots that easily break when bent beneath older branches. Additionally, isolated individuals of Salix purpurea (purple willow), Rosa canina (dog rose), and Robinia pseudacacia (black locust) are also present among the pebbles.

=== Climate ===
The climate in Giarmata commune is characterized as temperate continental, exhibiting distinct seasonal variations in temperature and precipitation. The region experiences warm summers and cold winters, with average annual temperatures typically ranging between 9°C and 11°C. Precipitation is moderately distributed throughout the year, with a slight increase during the spring and early summer months, supporting agricultural activities. The area is influenced by both Atlantic and continental air masses, which contribute to variable weather patterns, including occasional droughts and frosts. Overall, the climate conditions in Giarmata are conducive to the cultivation of a diverse range of crops, particularly cereals, industrial plants, and various fruit species.

== History ==
Traces of a Neolithic settlement and materials of Daco-Roman origin were discovered on the territory of the commune. During the formation of the Romanian people, on the territory of the commune the native Daco-Roman population continued to live in the form of a village community, and at the beginning of feudalism there was even a fairly strong voivodeship, recorded in the few narrative sources of that time. Thus, on the occasion of the great Mongol invasion of 1241, the Giarmata Voivodeship is mentioned.

His name is derived from a Hungarian tribal name Gyarmat. Giarmata is first mentioned in the registers of papal tithes from 1332–1337 with the names of Garmad and Carmad of Temes County. With the names of Zamar and Garmat, the locality is mentioned in 1334, so that a year later it would be designated as Germad. Later, in 1428, the locality is recorded as Giarmath. Between the 15th–18th centuries, it formed two villages, which in 1767 were located on two adjacent hills. In 1407, Sigismund granted Kisgyarmat to Miklós Vajdafi of Vajdafalva and his son Tamás. The family took on the noble name in 1418 and owned the two villages until 1515–20. After the expulsion of the Turks after the Great Turkish War, Big-Giarmata (Nagygyarmat) consisted of 36 houses and Small-Giarmata (Kisgyarmat) of 28, and both were inhabited by Serbs and Romanians.

The modern history of the locality begins with the conquest of Banat by the Austrians, in 1717. Under the new administration, Giarmata is colonized by Germans, who will form the majority of the population for almost two centuries. The Austrian Chamber first settled 20 German families from the Mainz countryside in 1722–24, then another 30 in 1728–30, this time from the villages of Ellstein, Schimdendenwaag, Kreuznach, Höchst and Zweibrücken. In 1730, a Roman Catholic parish was founded in the settlement. In 1737–40, about 1200 refugees from Versec and other settlements in the South Banat, who had arrived to escape the Turkish attack, swelled its population. In 1754 the Germans built their Roman Catholic Church, and in 1764 Josef Franz Knoll, an administrative officer of the Crown and Chamber domain. Between 1741 and 1763, Germans mainly from the Archbishopric of Mainz, the Pfalz and Lorraine settled there. 100 Serbian and Romanian families were moved partly to Románkécsa in 1765 and partly to Klári in 1768. According to Wolfgang von Kempelen's 1767 note, 238 new families arrived in their place, and in the summer of 1770, 1,005 people arrived, mainly from Luxembourg, Lorraine, the County of Siegen, Trier and the Pfalz. The two settlements, Alt- und Neujarmat ("Old and New Iarmata"), then became a single municipality, the streetscape of which was also changed during the relocation of the Serbs and Romanians. In 1781, it was purchased by Mihály Sándor at an auction, who sold it to István Gyürky in 1794. Half of the estate was inherited by Lajos Ambrózy, who after 1806 expanded it with four streets in the south and west, where so-called "contractualists" moved. In 1807, it received the privilege of a market town. The colonization lasted until around 1800 and made Giarmata a strong rural center of the Banat Swabians. The pharmacy opened in 1883 and in 1888 the Temesgyarmatai Takarék- és Hitelegylet (Temesgyarmat Savings and Credit Union) was founded. Between 1904 and 1908, 547 of its inhabitants emigrated to the United States, but emigration only reached its peak in 1923–24. After 1909, Baron Gyula Csávossy surveyed new plots. In the same year, Jenő Gudenus's castle was converted into a school. After 1956, Giarmata-Vii (Kisgyarmatapuszta) separated from it. Its German inhabitants left in the second half of the 20th century. Their place was gradually taken by Romanians from 1945.

== Demographics ==
Ethnic composition (2021)
1. Romanians (83.8%)
2. Roma (1.59%)
3. Unknown (13.6%)
4. Others (1.07%)
Religious composition (2021)
1. Orthodox (72.6%)
2. Pentecostals (7.40%)
3. Roman Catholics (1.75%)
4. Unknown (15.2%)
5. Others (2.22%)
6. Irreligious, atheists and agnostics (0.77%)

Giarmata had a population of 6,831 inhabitants at the 2021 census, up 5.06% from the 2011 census. Most inhabitants are Romanians (83.77%), with a minority of Roma (1.59%). For 13.57% of the population, ethnicity is unknown. By religion, most inhabitants are Orthodox (72.63%), but there are also minorities of Pentecostals (7.4%) and Roman Catholics (1.75%). For 15.23% of the population, religious affiliation is unknown.

Census		Ethnic composition
Year	Population	Romanians	Hungarians	Germans	Roma
1880	6,165	1,385	133	4,578	–
1890	7,081	1,652	104	5,261	–
1900	6,776	1,570	154	4,974	–
1910	6,599	1,482	174	4,826	–
1920	6,427	1,548	206	4,661	–
1930	6,393	1,514	168	4,678	18
1941	6,311	1,448	120	4,733	–
1956	5,582	1,857	82	3,632	–
1966	6,147	2,374	61	3,676	23
1977	6,333	2,749	108	3,417	36
1992	5,162	4,868	105	87	49
2002	5,407	5,069	144	23	108
2011	6,502	5,763	64	15	107
2021	6,831	5,723	36	10	109

== Politics and administration ==
The commune of Giarmata is administered by a mayor and a local council composed of 15 councilors. The mayor, Claudiu Mihălceanu, from the National Liberal Party, has been in office since 2020. As from the 2024 local elections, the local council has the following composition by political parties:

Party	Seats	Composition
National Liberal Party	9	
Social Democratic Party	3	
Alliance for the Union of Romanians	3	

== Economy ==
=== Agriculture ===
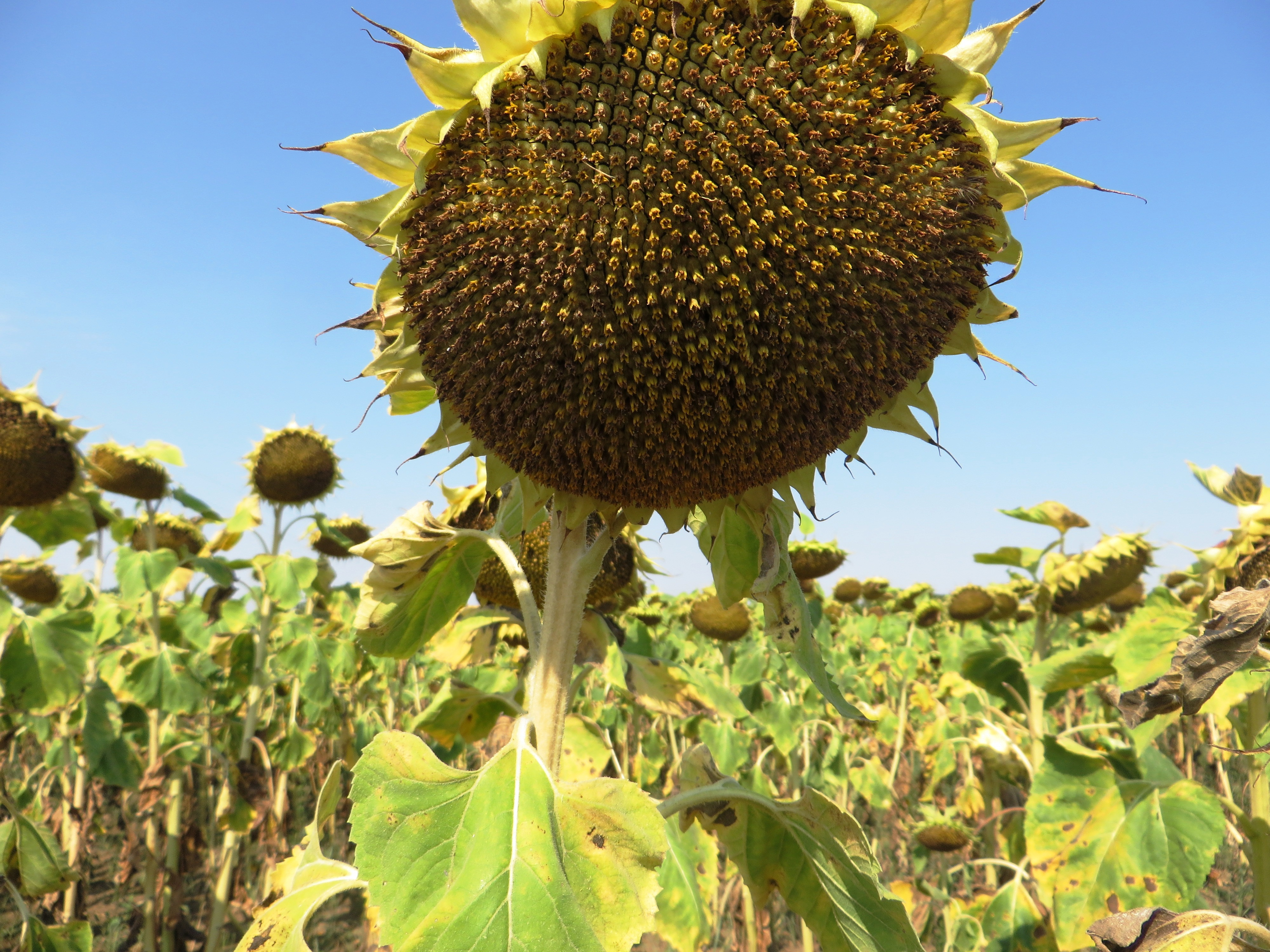
Sunflower cultivation in Giarmata

Agriculture in Giarmata commune is wholly privately owned. Agricultural lands are organized into large agricultural cooperatives or smaller private associations. This landowner association facilitates the implementation of modern agricultural practices, resulting in favorable production outcomes. The region primarily cultivates cereal crops such as wheat, barley, malt, and triticale, alongside industrial crops including soybeans, sunflowers, and rapeseed, as well as various vegetables. The most commonly cultivated fruit trees include plum, apple, cherry, sour cherry, apricot, quince, mulberry, and walnut.
