= Behela =

Behela Luchin
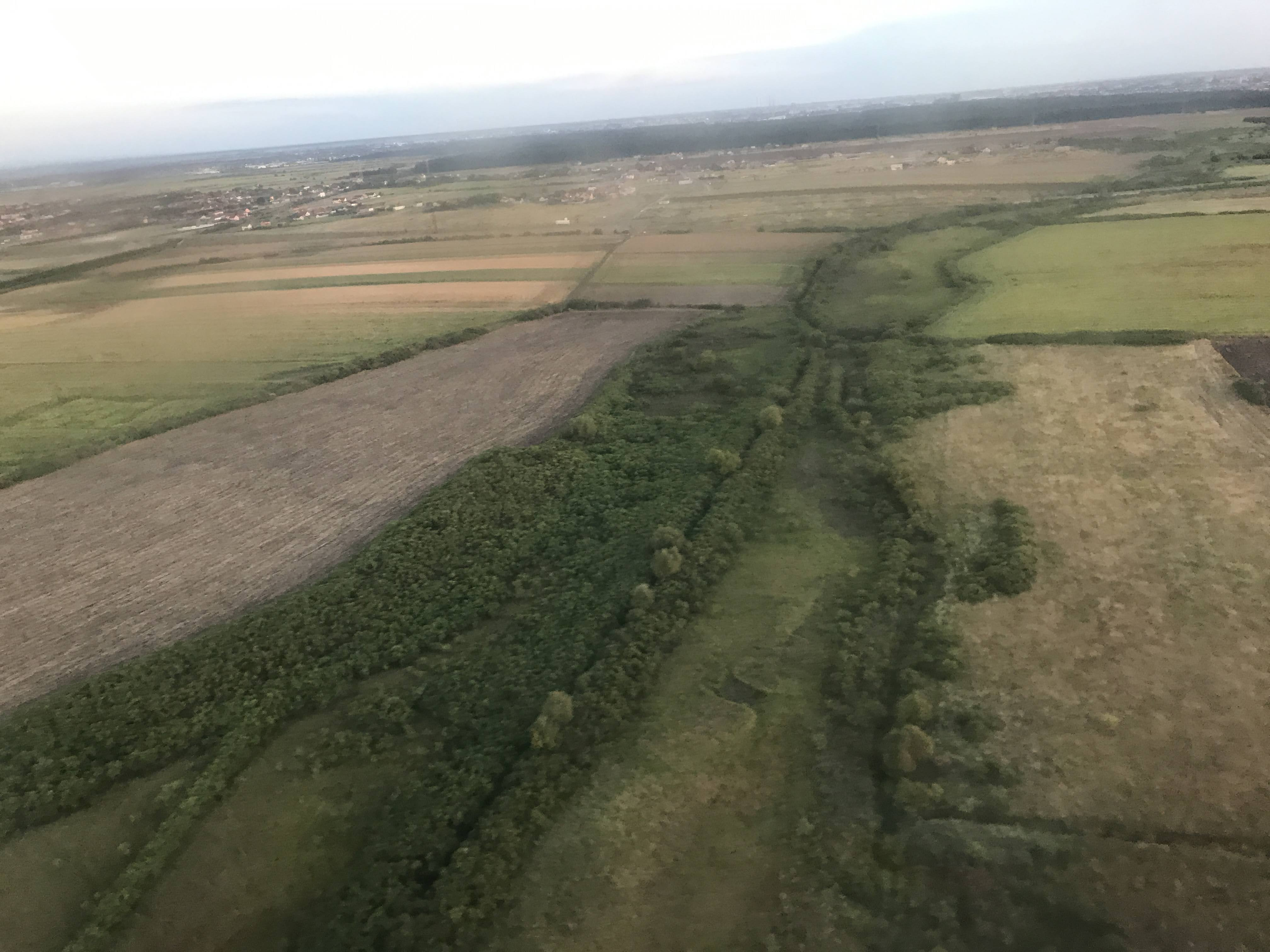
- Behela in the east of Dumbrăvița

- Location within Romania

Location
- Country: Romania
- Counties: Timiș County
- Villages: Giarmata, Dumbrăvița

Physical characteristics
- Mouth: Bega
  - location: Timișoara
  - coordinates: 45.7586°N 21.2648°E
- Length: 26 km (16 mi)
- Basin size: 65 km^{2} (25 sq mi)

Basin features
- Progression: Bega→ Tisza→ Danube→ Black Sea
- Tributaries
  - right: Unu

The Behela (also: Luchin) is a right tributary of the river Bega in Romania. It discharges into the Bega in Timișoara. Its length is 26 km (16 mi) and its basin size is 65 km^{2} (25 sq mi).
