= Hoechst =

Hoechst, Hochst, or Höchst may refer to:

- Hoechst AG, a former German life-sciences company
- Hoechst stain, one of a family of fluorescent DNA-binding compounds
- Höchst (Frankfurt am Main), a city district of Frankfurt am Main, Germany
  - Frankfurt Höchst station, its railway station
  - SG 01 Hoechst, German association football club
- Höchst im Odenwald, a community in Hesse, Germany
- Höchst, Austria, a municipality in Vorarlberg, Austria
- Nicole Höchst (born 1970), German politician for the Alternative for Germany
- Hochst. taxonomic author abbreviation of Christian Ferdinand Friedrich Hochstetter (1787–1860), German botanist
- Battle of Höchst (1622), fought between Catholic and Protestant armies
- Battle of Höchst (1795), fought between the Habsburg Austrian and French Republican armies
