= Timișoara Zoological Garden =

Zoo in Romania

Timișoara Zoological Garden Grădina Zoologică Timișoara
- Interactive map of Timișoara Zoological Garden; Grădina Zoologică Timișoara
- 45.7817709°N 21.2678146°E
- Date opened: 1986
- Date closed: 2020
- Location: Timișoara, Romania
- Land area: 6.34 hectares (15.7 acres)
- No. of animals: 261 (2020)
- No. of species: 46 (2020)

Timișoara Zoological Garden (Romanian: Grădina Zoologică Timișoara) was a 6.34-hectare (15.7-acre) zoo in Timișoara, Romania, located in the northeastern part of the city, near the Green Forest. It was originally opened in 1986 with 30 species of animals, mostly local to Romania.

== History ==
The zoo was opened to the public in 1986, and was home to about 30 species, most of which were native to Romania. It was originally administered by the Horticultura Autonomous Authority, which was eventually turned into a commercial enterprise.

In its early years the zoo was poorly administered, and in order to remedy this, the city acquired the land in 2002 and started a feasibility study on rehabilitating the zoo. The zoo was eventually closed to the public in the autumn of 2004. Renovation started with the infrastructure (electrical, sewage, and pumping systems) in 2004 and 2005 and continued in 2006 with parking, walkways, bridges and construction of habitats. The zoo became a member of the Romanian Zoo and Aquaria Federation in order to collaborate with other zoos in the country and the European Association of Zoos and Aquaria (EAZA). The renovation was finished in 2007, and the zoo opened again on 1 June 2007.

In November 2020, after the local press reported on the mismanagement of the zoo and the ill-treatment of animals, the mayor's office decided to close it and relocate all the animals to the zoos in the country and abroad until the zoo is modernized. Their relocation actually began in April 2021. In 2023, a local councilor proposed the reopening of the zoo as a promenade park, but the project did not meet the required number of votes in the Local Council.

== List of animals ==
- mammals: brown bear, European wildcat, red deer, roe deer, European rabbit, reindeer, Shetland pony, raccoon, Japanese macaque, lion, patas monkey, guanaco, guinea pig, Patagonian mara, red-necked wallaby, goat
- birds: common ostrich, emu, Indian peafowl, black swan, mute swan, swan goose, ruddy shelduck, Eurasian wigeon, northern pintail, Chiloé wigeon, Muscovy duck, chicken, helmeted guineafowl, wild turkey, Eurasian collared dove
- reptiles: pond slider, European pond turtle, Hermann's tortoise, Greek tortoise, green iguana

== See also ==
- List of places in Timișoara
