= Modern, Timișoara =

District of Timișoara, Romania

Coordinates: 45.7664358°N 21.2592104°E

Modern is a district in eastern Timișoara. It was built between 1970–1990. The name comes from the former Filt shoe factory, renamed Modern after nationalization. The company ceased its activity after 1990, and the factory was demolished for the construction of a third mall in Timișoara – Timișoara Plaza; the Israeli group Plaza Centers eventually gave up on the project.

== Transport ==
Public transport is provided by bus lines E4, E4B, M27, M30 and M35, tram line 1 and 2 and trolleybus line 11 and M11.
