= Banat Village Museum =

- Muzeul Satului Bănățean
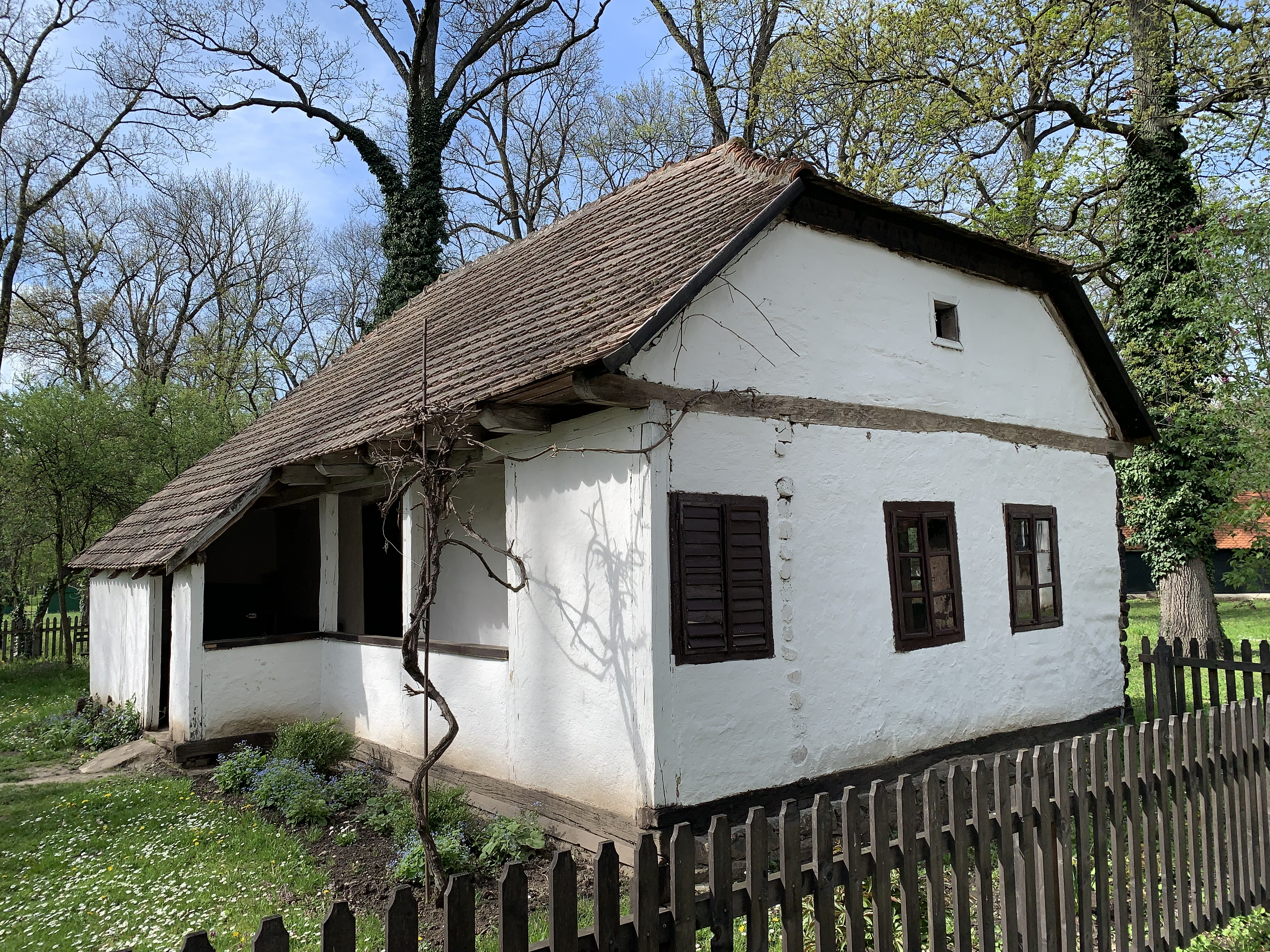
- Potter's homestead from Birchiș
- Established: 20 August 1971
- Location: Timișoara, Timiș, Romania
- Coordinates: 45°46′37.95″N 21°15′57.42″E
- Type: Open-air ethnographic museum
- Accreditation: Ministry of Culture
- Visitors: 85,000 (2017)
- Director: Dorel Micle
- Website: muzeulsatuluibanatean.ro

The Banat Village Museum (Romanian: Muzeul Satului Bănățean) is an open-air ethnographic museum in northeastern Timișoara, at the edge of the Green Forest. Spread over an area of 17 ha, the museum is designed as a traditional Banat village and includes peasant households belonging to various ethnic groups in Banat (Romanians, Slovaks, Swabians, Ukrainians, Hungarians, etc.), buildings with social function of the traditional village (town hall, school, church, etc.), folk art installations and workshops.

== History ==
The idea of establishing an open-air ethnographic museum goes back to Ioachim Miloia, former director of the Museum of Banat between 1928 and 1940. In 1928, after Miloia returned from the opening ceremony of the Ethnographic Museum of Transylvania in Cluj-Napoca, he asked the municipality for permission to open a small village museum in the courtyard of Huniade Castle. After the approval, he exhibited the first wooden churches, crosses and farmhouses here.

After several insistences from those who followed Ioachim Miloia at the head of the Museum of Banat (Marius Moga, Ioan Dihor), in 1967 the museum received the current plot of land on which developed the open-air ethnographic museum, open to public since 20 August 1971. In 1986 the museum was subject to preservation measures and was closed to visitors for a period of nine years by presidential decree; it was reopened on 1 May 1995. Until 2000, it functioned as a section of the Museum of Banat, after which it became a separate institution subordinated to the Timiș County Council. In 2006, the Ethnography section of the Museum of Banat (with its over 13,000 heritage objects) relocated to the Banat Village Museum.

== Collection ==
The museum is designed on three thematic levels – the Village Civic Center, the Alley of Ethnicities and the Living Museum.

=== Village Civic Center ===
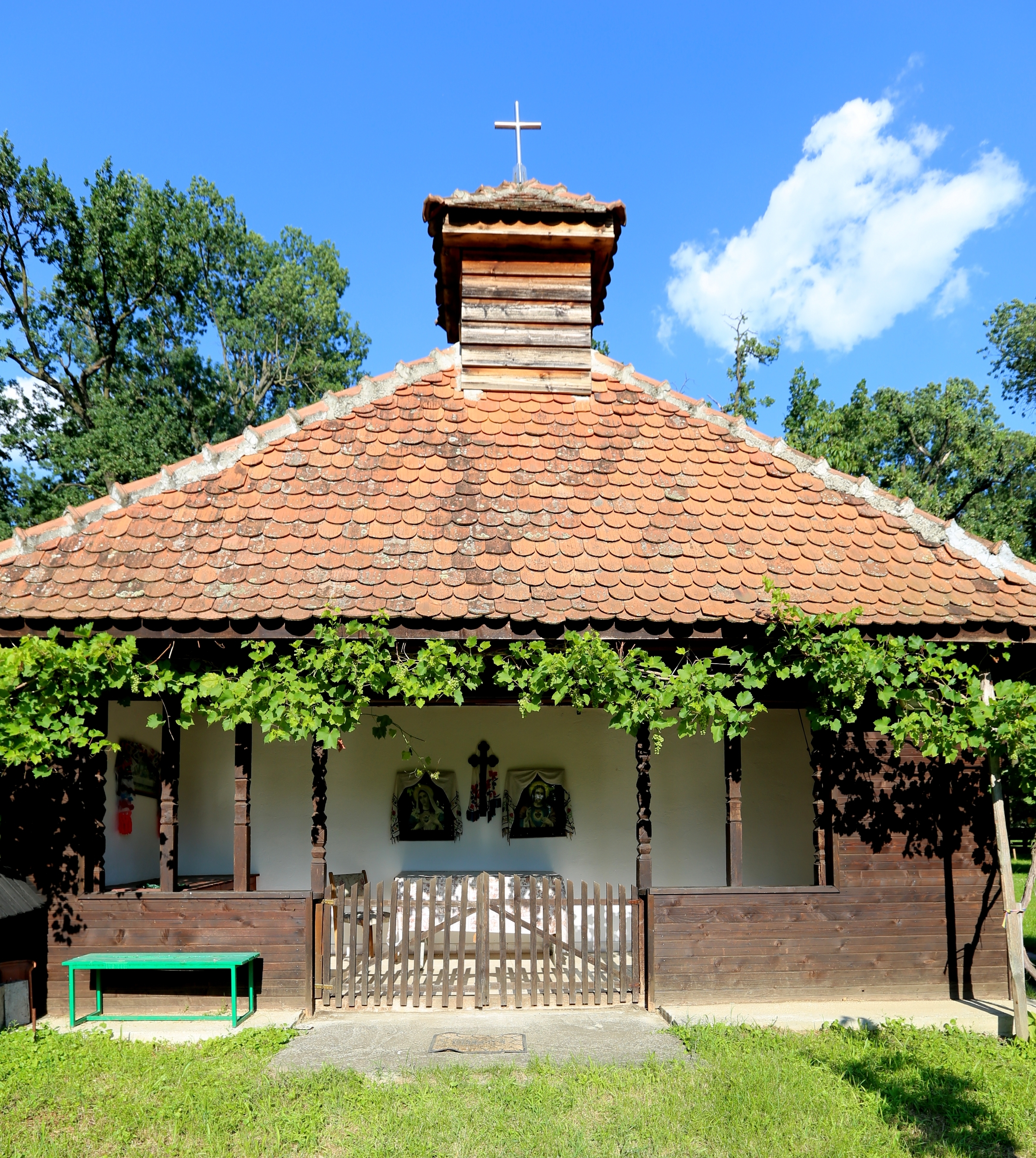
Building in the Village Civic Center

The core of the museum is the Village Civic Center, consisting of a town hall, a school, a "national house" and an inn, the central piece being the wooden church. Built in 1746 in Remetea-Luncă, it was donated in 1807 to churchgoers in the neighboring village of Topla, where it was moved on rollers pulled by 24 pairs of oxen. From there it was brought to the museum in 1987.

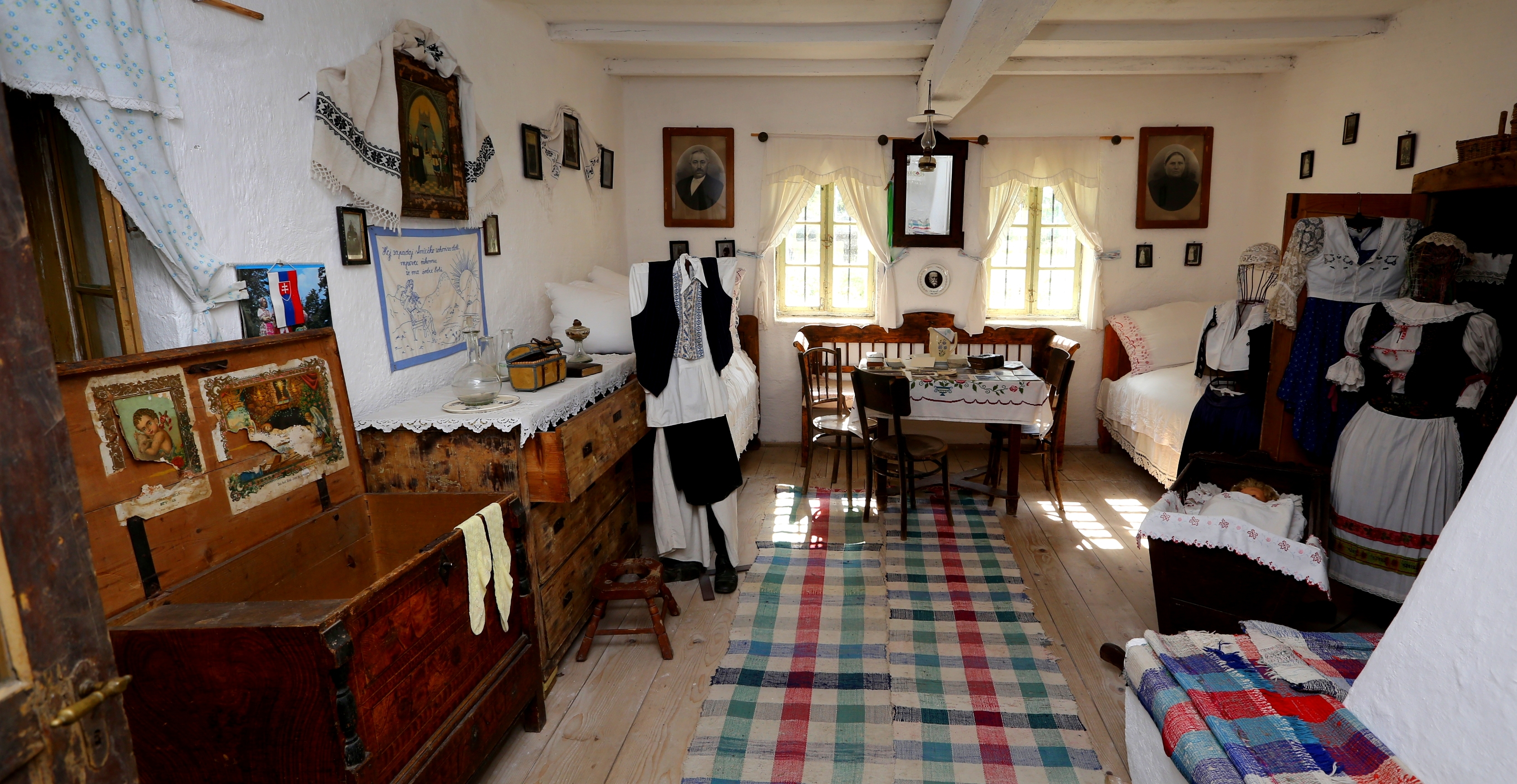
Folk costumes and interior fabrics on display

The houses are equipped with two or three living rooms, and a notable feature is the guest room, known as "clean sobă" or "big sobă" (sobă is a Banat regionalism for living room), beautifully decorated with precious fabrics such as carpets, rugs, and tablecloths. The roofs are supported by wooden poles with traditional ornamentation, and the houses range from those with thatched or shingle roofing to peasant and potter houses, completed with traditional technical installations.

=== Alley of Ethnicities ===
The Alley of Ethnicities consists of a series of traditional houses of the historical ethnic groups of Banat. Starting with 2000, a Hungarian house (Babșa, Timiș), a German house (Biled, Timiș), a Slovak house (Nădlac, Arad) and a Ukrainian house (Repedea, Maramureș) were inaugurated here. The Serbian house is currently under construction, and the director of the museum is considering the acquisition of a Bulgarian house and a Czech house.

=== Living Museum ===
The Living Museum is a cross-border project between Romania and Hungary started in 2012. The project aims at creating four replicas of traditional households (a Romanian house, a Hungarian house, a Swabian house and a Serbian house) as a reconstruction of country life in Banat in the 18th and 19th centuries.

== Festivals ==
Since 2000, every first Sunday of May, the Festival of Ethnicities takes place here, during which various ethnic groups exhibit their clothing, gastronomic and musical traditions. The Banat Village Museum also hosts other well-known events, including the Craftsmen's Fair (an exhibition selling traditional products of popular culture from all over the country) and the Plai Festival.

== Gallery ==
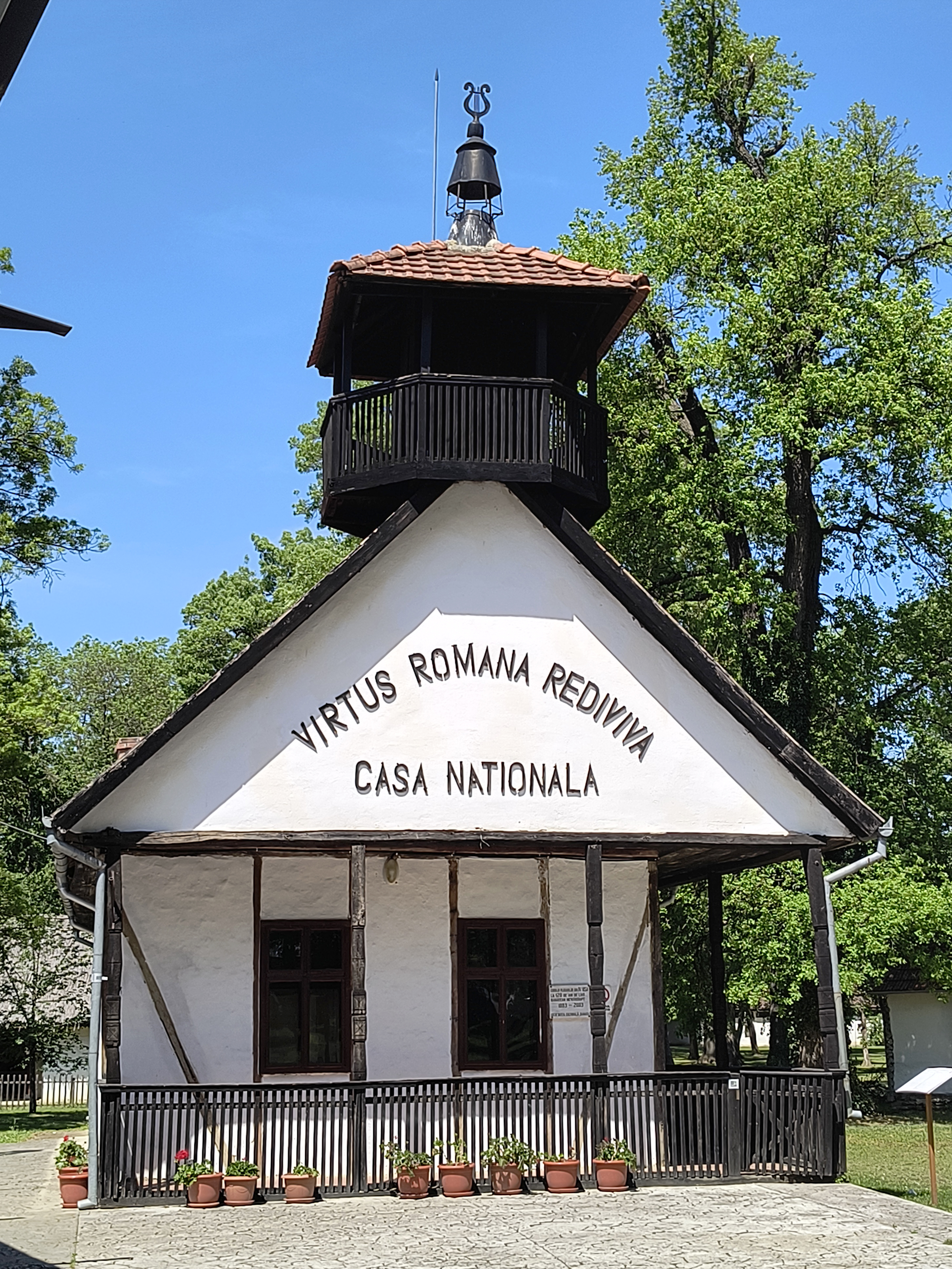
National house from Babșa

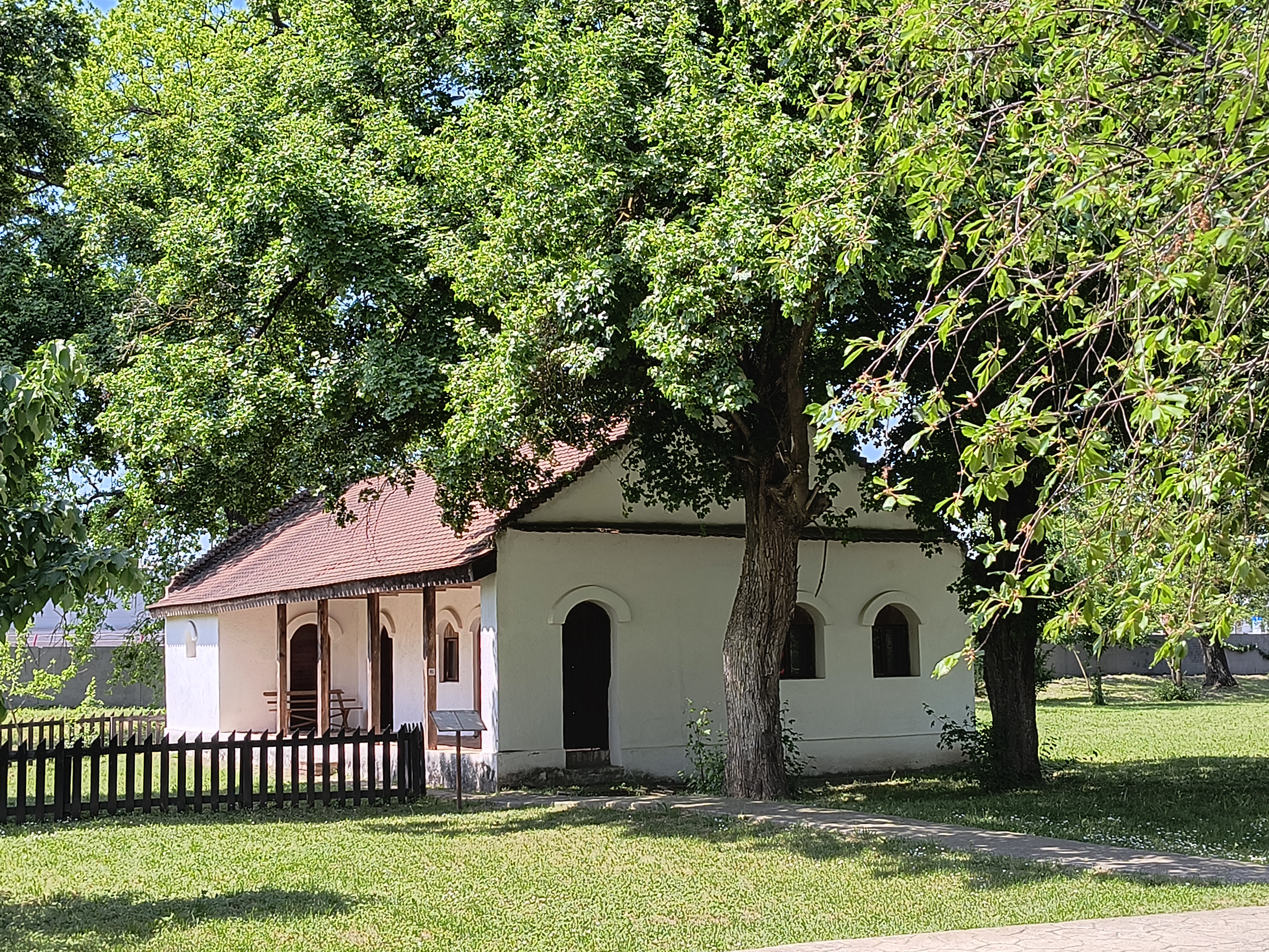
Serbian homestead

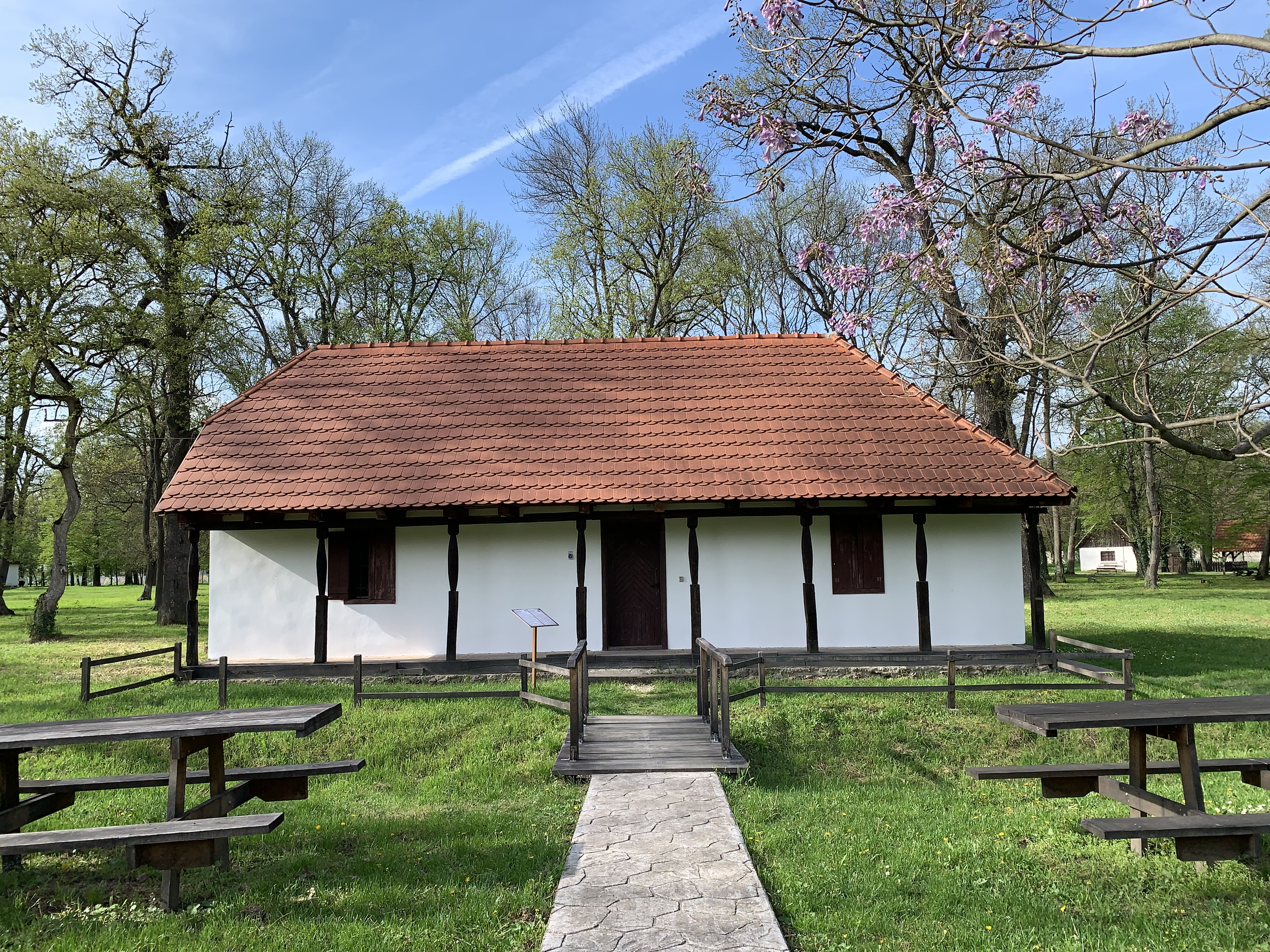
Tavern from Bârna

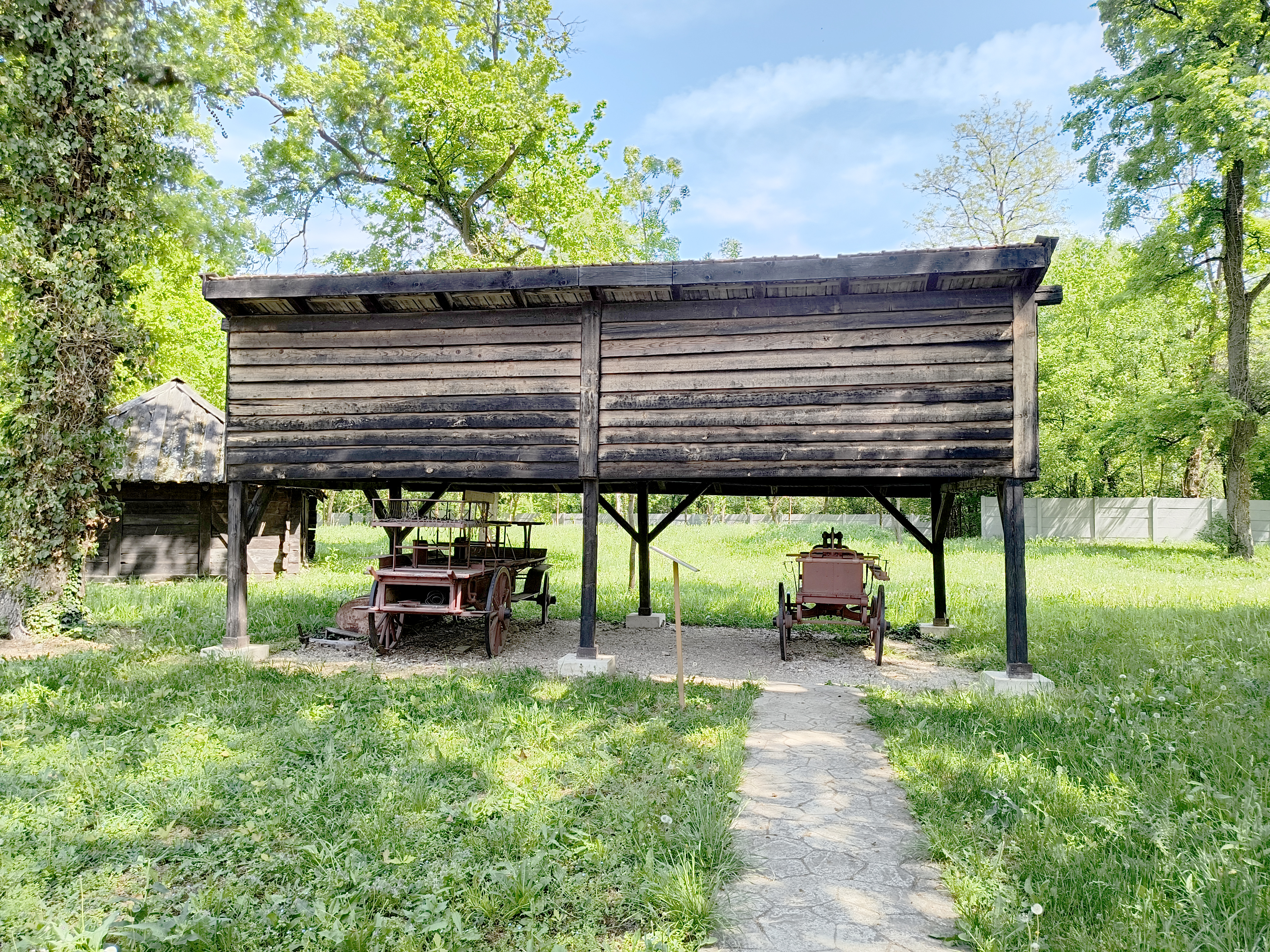
Fire station

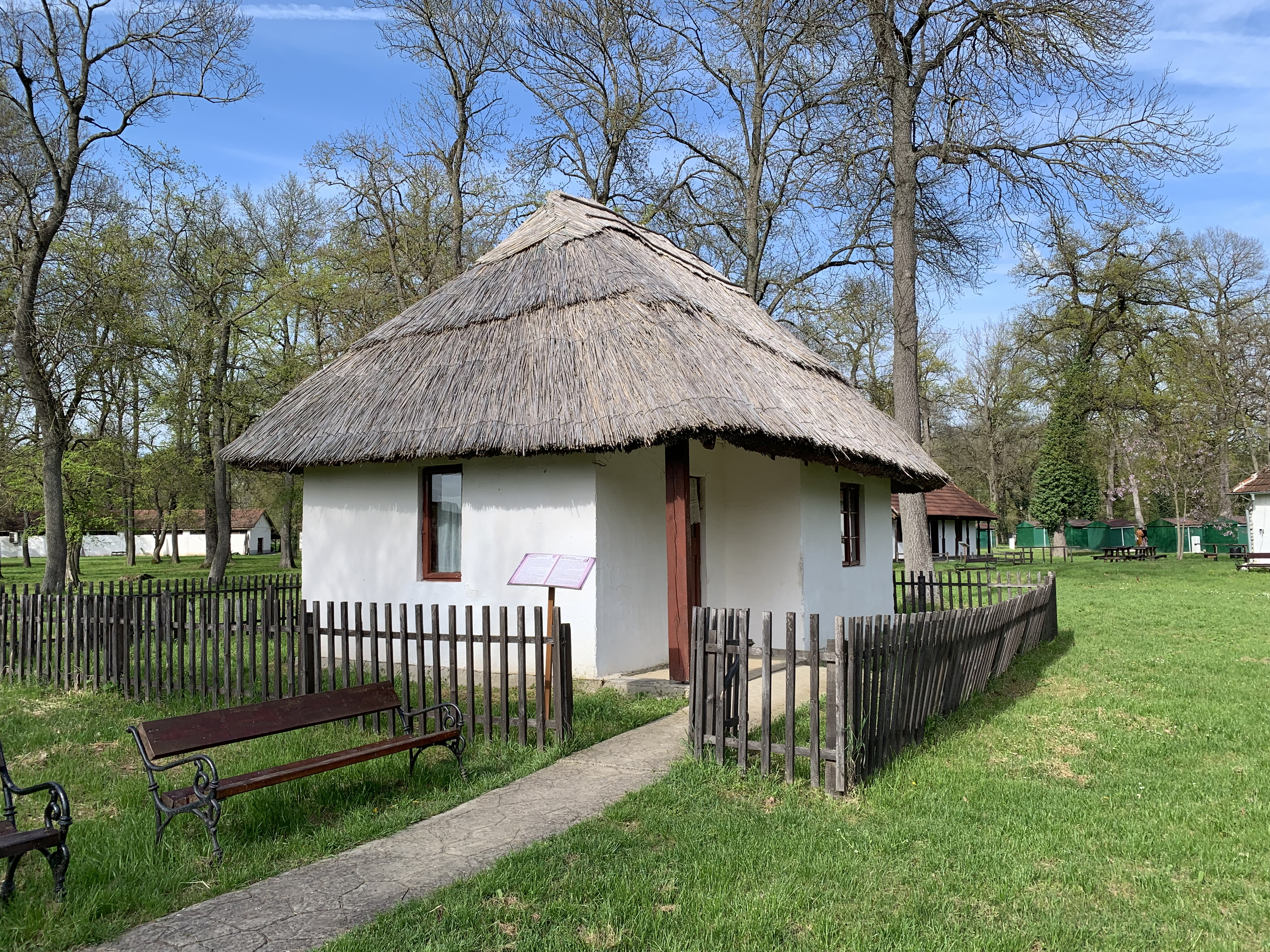
Deportees' house from Bărăgan

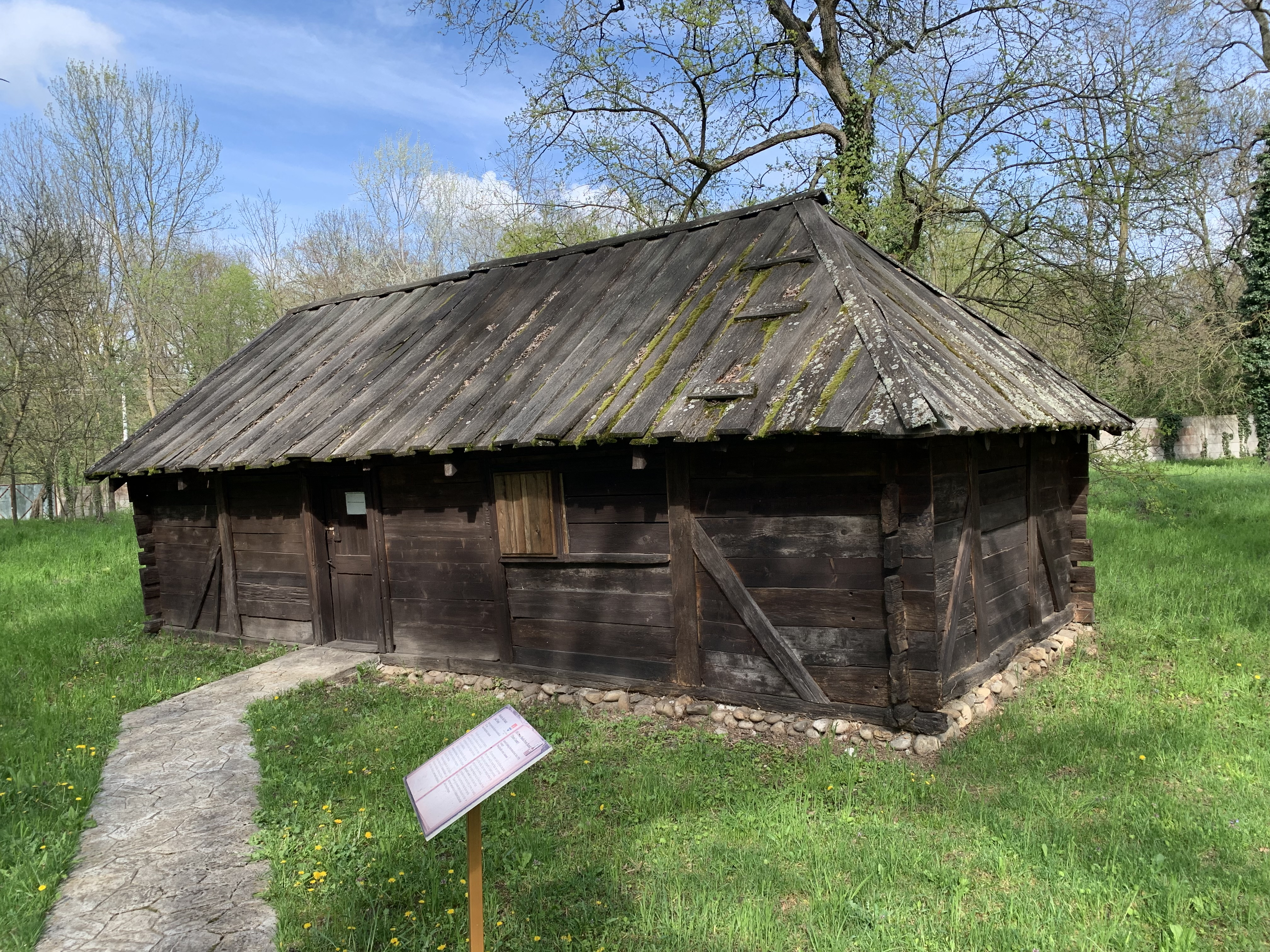
Oil mill from Satu Mic

== See also ==
- List of open-air and living history museums
